= King of Kings (Mandaean prayer) =

Prayer in Mandaeism

The King of Kings (Classical Mandaic: ࡌࡀࡋࡊࡀ ࡖࡊࡅࡋࡄࡅࡍ ࡌࡀࡋࡊࡉࡀ, romanized: malka ḏ-kulhun malkia, Modern Mandaic pronunciation: [ˈmelkɑ əd ˈkulhon ˈmelki]), or King of All Kings, is a Mandaean prayer. It is numbered as Prayer 176 in E. S. Drower's 1959 version of the Qulasta. It is commonly recited as part of Mandaean daily prayers (brakha).

== Text and translation ==
=== Al-Mubaraki (2010) ===
The Mandaic text below is from Al-Mubaraki (2010), and the English translation below is partially adapted from Gelbert and Lofts (2025).

Mandaic transliteration

ia malka ḏ-kulhun malkia
ia aba ḏ-kulhun ʿutria
ia adatan u-iadatan
ia šilmai u-nidbai
ʿutria naṭria ḏ-iardna
ia hibil ziua rba malka
mparqatlan mn kul mhašabata bišata
u-mparqatlan mn kul ḏ-biš u-snia
ia malka rama rba ḏ-nhura
qahbatan šapi[r]ut pagra
u-trahmut liba
u-maliut ʿda
u-tarṣut aina
ia hiia u-marai u-manda ḏ-hiia
mparqatlan u-mšauzbatlan u-mnaṭratlan
ia malka rama rba ḏ-nhura

English translation

O King of all Kings.
O Father of all Uthras.
O Adathan and Yadathan.
O Shilmai and Nidbai,
guardian uthras of the yardna.
O Great Hibil Ziwa, the King,
who protects us from evil machinations,
and liberates us from all that is evil and hateful.
O Great High King of the Light,
give me integrity of the body,
and compassion of the heart,
and ability of the hand,
and acuity of the eye.
O Hayyi and my Lord and Manda d-Hayyi,
free me, save me, and guard me.
O Great High King of the Light.

=== Choheili (2026) ===
Salem Choheili (c. 2026) recites a different shorter version of the Malka ḏ-Kulhun Malkia prayer. This version is also recited by Salah Choheili at Ganzibra Dakhil Mandi in Liverpool, New South Wales, Australia; during communal brakha prayers performed before sermons, Salah Choheili recites an extended version of the sahduta, parts of the beginning and conclusion of the Asut Malkia (but not the main litany itself), rahmia prayers 110, 111, and 112, the Qulasta's prelude, and finally the King of Kings prayer (prayer 176).

The English translation below is partially adapted from Gelbert and Lofts (2025).

Mandaic transliteration

ia malka ḏ-kulhun malkia
ia aba ḏ-kulhun ʿutria
ia adatan u-iadatan
ia šilmai u-nidbai
ʿuṭria naṭria ḏ-iardna
ia habšaba rba
ia hibil ziua rba malaia
mparqatlan mn kul ḏ-biš u-snia
ia malka rama rba ḏ-nhura
qahbatan šapiut pagria
maliut ʿdia
triṣut aina
u-rahmit ʿlan
u-samkit liban
ia malka rama rba ḏ-nhura

English translation

O King of all Kings.
O Father of all Uthras.
O Adathan and Yadathan.
O Shilmai and Nidbai,
guardian uthras of the yardna.
O Great Sunday.
O Great Hibil Ziwa, the Provider,
who liberates us from all that is evil and hateful.
O Great High King of the Light,
give me integrity of the body,
ability of the hands,
acuity of the eye,
and compassion for others,
and sustainment of our heart(s),
O Great High King of the Light.

== See also ==
- King of Kings
- Brakha (daily prayer in Mandaeism)
- Shumhata
- Asut Malkia
- Tabahatan
- Rushuma
- Rahma (Mandaeism)
- Qulasta
- List of Qulasta prayers
- Rishama (ablution)
- Tamasha (ablution)
