= List of Qulasta prayers =

The list below contains the 414 Mandaean prayers in E. S. Drower's 1959 Canonical Prayerbook (also known as the Qulasta), along with their ritual uses.

== Outline ==
Below is a brief outline of the Qulasta.

- 1–103: Sidra ḏ-Nišmata (103 prayers)
- 104–169: Rušma, Asut Malkia, and rahmia (64 rahmia prayers + 2 other prayers)
- 170–178: various prayers (for honoring ancestors, etc.) (9 prayers)
- 179–232: Qabin prayers (54 prayers)
  - 180–199: Qabin prayers (1st sequence) (20 prayers)
  - 200–214: Qabin prayers (2nd sequence, 1st series) (15 prayers)
  - 215–232: Qabin prayers (2nd sequence, 2nd series) (18 prayers)
- 233–256: Kḏ azil bhira dakia prayers (24 prayers)
- (257–304: 48 duplicate prayers)
  - (261–284: Kḏ azil bhira dakia prayer duplicates)
  - (285–304: Qabin (1st sequence) prayer duplicates)
- 305–329: Coronation prayers (25 prayers)
- 330–347: Drabša prayers (18 prayers)
- 348–385: Zidqa brika prayers (also post-zidqa brika prayers and myrtle prayers) (38 prayers)
- (386–409: 24 duplicate coronation prayers)
- 410–414: various prayers (5 prayers)

== List ==
=== Explanatory notes ===
Opening lines, which exclude frequently used formulas such as "In the name of Hayyi Rabbi", are included since the original scribal commentaries in the Qulasta manuscripts, as well as external priestly esoteric commentaries (e.g., Scroll of Exalted Kingship), typically refer to each Qulasta prayer by its opening line rather than by an ordered number. The English translations of the opening lines are from Drower (1959), while the Mandaic transliterations of the opening lines, when available, are from Mark Lidzbarski's Mandäische Liturgien (1920) and The Qulasta by Gelbert & Lofts (2025). A list of opening lines is also listed in Al-Mubaraki (2010).

Drower (1959) also categorizes the prayers into different sections. Originally, some of these sections had historically been separate manuscripts before they had been compiled by Mandaean scribes into single codices (books) such as MS Drower 53 (also known as DC 53).

Each prayer is typically recited only for a specific stage of a certain ritual, as listed in the "commentary" column below. For example, see Tarmida § Prayer sequence for a detailed list of prayers recited during different stages of the tarmida initiation ceremony.

Corresponding prayers in Lidzbarski's Mandäische Liturgien (1920) are also provided.

Many of the prayers are identical or nearly identical duplicates of other prayers in the prayerbook, as listed in the "corresponding prayer" column in the below. Duplicate prayers omitted by Drower (1959) and Gelbert & Lofts (2025) are shaded in light blue ; prayer variants (prayers 259, 260, 412, etc.) are not shaded.

Links to audio recordings of Qulasta prayers read by Salem Choheili are also provided when available.

=== Table ===
Number	Opening line	Commentary	Corresponding prayer	Lidzbarski (1920)	Section
0 (prelude)	"In the name of the great, first, alien life from the worlds of light" b-šumaihun ḏ-hiia rbia qadmaiia nukraiia mn almia ḏ-nhura	prelude ("prayer of the first and alien", buta qadmaiia nukraiia) (audio)		Prelude	Book of Souls (masbuta liturgy)
1	"In the name of that first man" b-šuma ḏ-hahu gabra qadmaia	prayer of the turban ("prayer of the ancients", buta d̠-qašiš) (audio)		Qolastā 1	Book of Souls (masbuta liturgy)
2	"Illumined and illuminating is Zihrun" zhir u-mzahar zihrun	opening prayer of "In the name of that First Being" (audio)		Qolastā 2	Book of Souls (masbuta liturgy)
3	"Life created Yawar-Ziwa" hiia qiriuia l-iauar ziua	prayer of the turban (audio)		Qolastā 3	Book of Souls (masbuta liturgy)
4	"As the ʿUthras stand in their škintas" kḏ qaimia ʿutria b-škinatun	prayer of dedication of "Life created Yawar-Ziwa" (audio)		Qolastā 4	Book of Souls (masbuta liturgy)
5	"Let there be light" nhur nhura	prayer for the turban (audio)		Qolastā 5	Book of Souls (masbuta liturgy)
6	"A crown of ether-light shone forth" ʿtiar klila nhur aiar	prayer of "loosing", "Let there be Light" (audio)		Qolastā 6	Book of Souls (masbuta liturgy)
7	"Strengthened and enhanced is the great mystery of radiance" haial kbar raza rba ḏ-ziua	prayer of pandama (long end of turban) for baptism (audio)		Qolastā 7	Book of Souls (masbuta liturgy)
8	"Incense that is fragrant" riha ḏ-basim	prayer of incense (audio)		Qolastā 8	Book of Souls (masbuta liturgy)
9	"Raising my eyes and lifting up my countenance" mišqal ainia arumia gilia parṣupai	prayer of radiance (audio)		Qolastā 9	Book of Souls (masbuta liturgy)
10	"On the day that the Jordan was bestowed upon Sam-Smir" b-iuma ḏ-iardna ʿhablḥ l-sam smir	prayer of the Jordan (audio)		Qolastā 10	Book of Souls (masbuta liturgy)
11	"I have worshipped and praised that Yawar-Ziwa" sigdit u-šabatḥ l-hak iauar ziua	prayer of Yawar-Ziwa (audio)		Qolastā 11	Book of Souls (masbuta liturgy)
12	"I am Yur son of Barit" ana hu iur br barit	opening prayer for the Jordan (audio)		Qolastā 12	Book of Souls (masbuta liturgy)
13	"I went to the jordan" l-iardna asgit	(audio)		Qolastā 13	Book of Souls (masbuta liturgy)
14	"In the names of Yusmir the First Vine" b-šuma ḏ-iusmir gupna qadmaia	prayer of the staff (audio)		Qolastā 14	Book of Souls (masbuta liturgy)
15	"Bound is the sea" ʿsir iama	exorcism prayer (audio)		Qolastā 15	Book of Souls (masbuta liturgy)
16	"I am a perfected gem" gimra ana gmira	exorcism prayer (audio)		Qolastā 16	Book of Souls (masbuta liturgy)
17	"Avaunt! Flee in fear" zha u-ʿtazha	exorcism prayer (audio)		Qolastā 17	Book of Souls (masbuta liturgy)
18	"Piriawis, the great jordan of the First Life" piriauis iardna rba ḏ-hiia qadmaiia	prayer of the Jordan (audio)		Qolastā 18	Book of Souls (masbuta liturgy)
19	"Manda created me" manda qran	set prayer for the baptism wreath (audio)		Qolastā 19	Book of Souls (masbuta liturgy)
20	"Blessed art thou, Outer Door" brikit tira baraia	dedicatory prayer of the Jordan (audio)		Qolastā 20	Book of Souls (masbuta liturgy)
21	"I rose up from the jordan" mn iardna silqit	(audio)		Qolastā 21	Book of Souls (masbuta liturgy)
22	"We have acknowledged the name of Life" audin bḥ b-šuma ḏ-hiia	prayer of oil (audio)		Qolastā 22	Book of Souls (masbuta liturgy)
23	"Precious oil art thou, son of white sesame" miša anat šiha br šušma hiuara	prayer of oil (audio)		Qolastā 23	Book of Souls (masbuta liturgy)
24	"Thou wast established, First Life" ʿtqaiamtun hiia qadmaiia	prayer of oil (audio)		Qolastā 24	Book of Souls (masbuta liturgy)
25	"When a jordan of living water was bestowed" kḏ ʿhablḥ iardna ḏ-mia hiia	"sealing" prayer (audio)		Qolastā 25	Book of Souls (masbuta liturgy)
26	"Bound and sealed are these souls" ("lesser" prayer) ʿsira u-htima halin nišmata (zuṭa)	"sealing" prayer (audio)		Qolastā 26	Book of Souls (masbuta liturgy)
27	"We were set up and raised up by 'Uṣar-Hiia" b-ʿuṣar hiia triṣinin u-mqaiminin	"sealing" prayer (audio)		Qolastā 27	Book of Souls (masbuta liturgy)
28	"Bound and sealed are these souls" ("greater" prayer) ʿsira u-htima halin nišmata (rabtia)	"sealing" prayer (audio)		Qolastā 28	Book of Souls (masbuta liturgy)
29	"Ye are set up and raised up into the Place of the Good" ʿtriṣtun u-ʿtqaiamtun b-atra ḏ-ṭabia	(audio)		Qolastā 29	Book of Souls (masbuta liturgy)
30	"What did thy Father do for thee, Soul" mahu abadlak abuk nišma	baptism hymn (audio)		Qolastā 30	Book of Souls (masbuta liturgy)
31	"Radiance goeth up to its place" ziua l-atrḥ saliq	"loosing" (consecration) of incense for baptism (audio)		Qolastā 31	Book of Souls (masbuta liturgy)
32	"Strengthened, enhanced was the great mystery of radiance" haial kbar raza rba ḏ-ziua	(audio)		Qolastā 32	Book of Souls (masiqta liturgy)
33	"Water of Life art thou" mia anatun hiia	mambuha prayer (audio)		Qolastā 33	Book of Souls (masiqta liturgy)
34	"Hail to the First Life before Whom none existed" hal hiia qadmaiia ḏ-ˁniš qudamaikun lahua	ordinance for the incense (audio)		Qolastā 34	Book of Souls (masiqta liturgy)
35	"I sought to lift my eyes, shoulders and arms" bit mišqal ainia kadpia u-draiia	(audio)		Qolastā 35	Book of Souls (masiqta liturgy)
36	"I worship, laud and praise that great, secret, First Mana" sagidna šahabana u-mšabana l-hak mana rba kasia qadmaia	prayer for the pihta (audio)		Qolastā 36	Book of Souls (masiqta liturgy)
37	"I worship, laud and praise that Occult, great First Cloud" sagidna šahabana u-mšabana l-hahʿ anana kasita rabtia qadmaita	prayer for the pihta (audio)		Qolastā 37	Book of Souls (masiqta liturgy)
38	"I have worshipped and praised Yawar-Ziwa" sigdit u-šabatḥ l-iauar ziua	prayer for the pihta (audio)		Qolastā 38	Book of Souls (masiqta liturgy)
39	"l worship, laud and praise that secret saying" sagidna šahabana u-mšabana l-hak šuta kasita	prayer for the pihta (audio)		Qolastā 39	Book of Souls (masiqta liturgy)
40	"I have worshipped and praised ʿUṣar" sigdit u-šabatḥ l-ʿuṣar	prayer for the pihta (audio)		Qolastā 40	Book of Souls (masiqta liturgy)
41	"I worshipped and praised Treasure-of-Light" sigdit u-šabatḥ l-ʿuṣar nhur iauar rba	prayer for the pihta (audio)		Qolastā 41	Book of Souls (masiqta liturgy)
42	"I worship, laud and praise that first secret Word" sagidna šahabana u-mšabana l-hak šuta kasita qadmaita	prayer for the pihta (audio)		Qolastā 42	Book of Souls (masiqta liturgy)
43	"Thou art enduring, First Life" mqaimitun hiia qadmaiia	prayer for the pihta (audio)		Qolastā 43	Book of Souls (masiqta liturgy)
44	"Biriawiš, source of living waters" biriauiš kana ḏ-mia hiia	appointed prayer for the mambuha (audio)		Qolastā 44	Book of Souls (masiqta liturgy)
45	"Thy name, (O) Life, is excellent" šumak iatir hiia	set prayer for the mambuha (audio)		Qolastā 45	Book of Souls (masiqta liturgy)
46	"The Light became light" nhar nhura	myrtle-wreath prayer (audio)		Qolastā 46	Book of Souls (masiqta liturgy)
47	"Enlightened and enlightening are words of light" zhira u-mzahra minilia ḏ-nhura	myrtle-wreath prayer (audio)		Qolastā 47	Book of Souls (masiqta liturgy)
48	"Manda ḏ-Hiia went to the stars" asgia manda ḏ-hiia l-kukbia	recitation over pure oil (audio)		Qolastā 48	Book of Souls (masiqta liturgy)
49	"This, the glory and light of life" hazin ziua u-nhur hiia	(audio)		Qolastā 49	Book of Souls (masiqta liturgy)
50	"Rightly did the baptist baptise me" ašar ṣban ṣabuha	(audio)		Qolastā 50	Book of Souls (masiqta liturgy)
51	"I am baptised in the name of the Strange Life" ṣbina b-šuma ḏ-hiia nukraiia iatiria	(audio)		Qolastā 51	Book of Souls (masiqta liturgy)
52	"Whose son am I?" brḥ ana ḏ-man	(audio)		Qolastā 52	Book of Souls (masiqta liturgy)
53	"A letter, union and victory" ʿngirta laupa u-zakuta	seal of the masiqta (audio)		Qolastā 53	Book of Souls (masiqta liturgy)
54	"Yukašar chose her" bihrḥ iukašar	(audio)		Qolastā 54	Book of Souls (masiqta liturgy)
55	"The Great Life spoke and revealed" malil u-pta hiia rbia b-pumaihun	loosing of the pandama (audio)		Qolastā 55	Book of Souls (masiqta liturgy)
56	"Living waters shone forth (in splendour) in their škinta" ʿtiar mia hiia l-škinatun	prayer of dedication for the "water of prayer" (audio)		Qolastā 56	Book of Souls (masiqta liturgy)
57	"Fragrant incense riseth to its place" riha basima l-atrḥ nisaq	dedication prayer for the incense (audio)		Qolastā 57	Book of Souls (masiqta liturgy)
58	"Praised be the First Life, praised be the Word of the First Life" mšabin hiia qadmaiia u-mšaba malalun ḏ-hiia qadmaiia	offering-up of supplications (audio)		Qolastā 58	Book of Souls (masiqta liturgy)
59	"Life is fulfilled in its own glory" ʿtimlun hiia b-ziua ḏ-napšaihun	prayer offered up for the pihta (audio)		Qolastā 59	Book of Souls (masiqta liturgy)
60	"The Great Life dwelleth in those that love Him" škinia hiia rbia b-rahmaihun	dedicatory prayer for the mambuha (audio)		Qolastā 60	Book of Souls (masiqta liturgy)
61	"An earthly wreath fadeth" klil almia šahia	prayer put up for the wreath of a masiqta (audio)		Qolastā 61	Book of Souls (masiqta liturgy)
62	"The worlds glisten (with costly) oil" almia b-miša šihia	(audio)		Qolastā 62	Book of Souls (masiqta liturgy)
63	"In great radiance am I immersed" b-ziu ḏ-npiš ṣbina	prayer offered up for the masiqta oil (audio)		Qolastā 63	Book of Souls (masiqta liturgy)
64	"The Life dwelleth in its own radiance and light" škinia hiia b-ziuaihun u-nhuraihun ḏ-napšaihun	confirmation of the (prayer) "Yukašar chose her who passeth over" (audio)		Qolastā 64	Book of Souls (masiqta liturgy)
65	"Ye are set up and raised up into the Place" ʿtriṣtun u-ʿtqaiamtun b-atra	(audio)		Qolastā 65	Book of Souls (masiqta liturgy)
66	"I am crowned with a wreath and lay me down" mkalalna u-šakibna	masiqta hymn (audio)	Left Ginza 3.43	Qolastā 66	Book of Souls (masiqta liturgy)
67	"With him, with the Deliverer" minḥ u-mn šaruia nisqa	(audio)		Qolastā 67	Book of Souls (masiqta liturgy)
68	"Between the Hidden and the Radiance" binia kisia l-ziua	(audio)	Left Ginza 3.20	Qolastā 68	Book of Souls (masiqta liturgy)
69	"Bliss and peace there will be" niaha u-šalma nihuia	(audio)		Qolastā 69	Book of Souls (masiqta liturgy)
70	"Blessed and praised be the life" of the souls brikia u-mšabia hiia ḏ-l-halin nišmata	(audio)		Qolastā 70	Book of Souls (masiqta liturgy)
71	"Blessed and praised be Life" of Šum bar Nū brikia u-mšabia hiia (šum br nū)	(audio)		Qolastā 71	Book of Souls (masiqta liturgy)
72	"Good is the Good for the good" ṭab ṭaba l-ṭaba	(audio)		Qolastā 72	Book of Souls (masiqta liturgy)
73	"A sealed letter which leaveth the world" ʿngirta mhatamta ḏ-napqa minḥ mn alma	prayer over the flask of oil (audio)	Left Ginza 3.27	Qolastā 73	Engirta
74	"Bound (secured) and sealed are the spirit and soul" ʿsira u-htima ruha u-nišimta	conclusion of the "Letter" (audio)		Qolastā 74	Engirta
75	"We have acknowledged and praises (are due)" audin u-tušbihan	Audin u-tušbihan (audio)	(parallels with Psalm 114)	Qolastā 75	Hymns of Praise
76	"Praises to the Outer Life" tušbihan l-hiia baraiia	(audio)		Qolastā 76	Hymns of Praise
77	"Thee (O) life, (is it meet) to praise, to honour" ʿlkun dilkun hiia l-šabuhia l-iaquria	(audio)		Qolastā 77	Hymns of Praise
78	"May my thought, my knowledge and my understanding enlighten me" ninharlia ʿuṣrai u-madai u-madihtai	(audio)		Qolastā 78	ʿNiania (responses)
79	"When the myrtle, the myrtle, flourished" kḏ asa asa	prayer of wreath of myrtle for the staff (audio)		Qolastā 79	ʿNiania (responses)
80	"Hear me, my Father, hear me" ("greater" prayer) ʿunan ab ʿunian (rabtia)	(audio)		Qolastā 80	ʿNiania (responses)
81	"Hear me, my Father, hear me" ("lesser" prayer) ʿunian ab ʿunian (zuṭa)	(audio)		Qolastā 81	ʿNiania (responses)
82	"At the Fountain-head came I forth" b-riš mia nipqit	prayer for the mambuha (audio)		Qolastā 82	ʿNiania (responses)
83	"How lovely are plants which the jordan hath planted" kma šapiria šitlia ḏ-štal u-aqim iardna	hymn of baptism (audio)		Qolastā 83	ʿNiania (responses)
84	"Truly did my baptiser baptise me" ašar ṣban ṣabuiai	hymn of baptism (audio)		Qolastā 84	ʿNiania (responses)
85	"Šilmai hath baptised us with his baptism" šilmai ṣbinan b-maṣbuta	hymn of baptism (audio)		Qolastā 85	ʿNiania (responses)
86	"The jordan in which we have been immersed" iardna ḏ-ʿṣṭbinabḥ	hymn of baptism (audio)		Qolastā 86	ʿNiania (responses)
87	"I rejoice in my priests" ana b-tarmidai hadina	hymn of baptism (audio)		Qolastā 87	ʿNiania (responses)
88	"Rightly do I say to you, my Chosen" ṭab ʿlkun amarna bhirai	hymn of baptism (audio)		Qolastā 88	ʿNiania (responses)
89	"To you do I call and (you) do I teach" ʿlkun qarina u-maprišna	hymn of baptism (audio)		Qolastā 89	ʿNiania (responses)
90	"A disciple am I, a new one" tarmida ana hadta	hymn of baptism (audio)		Qolastā 90	ʿNiania (responses)
91	"My vigilance and praisegiving" ʿrutai u-tušbihtai	hymn of the masiqta (audio)		Qolastā 91	ʿNiania (responses)
92	"Go in peace, chosen, pure and guiltless one" ʿzil b-šlam bhira dakia	hymn of the masiqta (audio)	Left Ginza 3.4	Qolastā 92	ʿNiania (responses)
93	"The mana rejoiceth in its treasure" mana b-ginzia hadia	hymn of the masiqta (audio)		Qolastā 93	ʿNiania (responses)
94	"Hail to thee, hail to thee, soul" ṭubak ṭubak nišma	hymn of the masiqta (audio)	Left Ginza 3.3	Qolastā 94	ʿNiania (responses)
95	"Her Sunday, her kušṭa and her alms" habšaba u-kušṭa u-zidqa	hymn of the masiqta (audio)		Qolastā 95	ʿNiania (responses)
96	"I am provided and provisioned" zidana u-mzaudana	hymn of the masiqta (audio) (Note: Recited by Rafid al-Sabti.)	Left Ginza 3.2	Qolastā 96	ʿNiania (responses)
97	"He rose and took me with him" sliq u-asqan minḥ	hymn of the masiqta		Qolastā 97	ʿNiania (responses)
98	"The day on which the soul goeth forth" iuma ḏ-napiq nišma	hymn of the masiqta	Left Ginza 3.7	Qolastā 98	ʿNiania (responses)
99	"Ye are set up and raised up, my Chosen ones" ʿtriṣtun u-ʿtqaiamtun bhirai	hymn of the masiqta		Qolastā 99	ʿNiania (responses)
100	"In a building which Life buildeth, good trees flourish" binta ḏ-bainia hiia ˁlania ṭabia b-gauẖ rauzia	hymn of the masiqta		Qolastā 100	ʿNiania (responses)
101	"The Life hath founded a dwelling" škan hiia škinta	hymn of the masiqta		Qolastā 101	ʿNiania (responses)
102	"The building that Life buildeth will never come to nought" binta ḏ-bainia hiia l-dardaria la-baṭla	prayer of the communion		Qolastā 102	ʿNiania (responses)
103	"Darkness is crushed back into the Dark" kbiš hšuka b-ʿuma			Qolastā 103	ʿNiania (responses)
104	"May Kušṭa strengthen you" kušṭa asinkun	daily ablution prayer (audio)			Rušuma
105	"Healing and victory be thine" asuta u-zakuta nihuilkun	(audio)			Asut Malkia
106	"Up, up! (ye) Elect righteous ones" qum qum bhiria zidqa	opening (prayer) of the "Devotions" (audio)		Oxford 1.1	Rahmia (devotions)
107	"My good messenger of light" ašgandai ṭaba ḏ-nhura	early morning devotion (audio)	111	Oxford 1.2	Rahmia (devotions)
108	"I worship Life and I praise my lord Manda ḏ-Hiia" l-hiia sagidna u-l-marai manda ḏ-hiia mšabana	early morning devotion (audio)	109, 112	Oxford 1.3	Rahmia (devotions)
109	"I worship Life and I praise my lord Manda ḏ-Hiia" l-hiia sagidna u-l-marai manda ḏ-hiia mšabana	devotion of the seventh hour	108, 112	Oxford 1.4	Rahmia (devotions)
110	"The time, the time for devotions arriveth" ʿdana ḏ-rahmia maṭia			Oxford 1.5	Rahmia (devotions)
111	"My good messenger of light" ašgandai ṭaba ḏ-nhura		107	Oxford 1.6	Rahmia (devotions)
112	"I worship the Life and I praise my lord Manda ḏ-Hiia" l-hiia sagidna u-l-marai manda ḏ-hiia mšabana	prayer of "the time of devotions" (opening prayer of the eventide devotions)	108, 109	Oxford 1.7	Rahmia (devotions)
113	"On the light of Ether do I stand" ʿl nhur aiar qaiimna	"Devotion" for daybreak after incense (audio)		Oxford 1.8	Rahmia (devotions)
114	"Early I arose from my sleep" mn šintai qadmit u-qamit	"Devotion" for daybreak after incense (audio)		Oxford 1.9	Rahmia (devotions)
115	"We have purified our hands in kušṭa (truth)" halilnin ʿdan b-kušṭa	"Devotion" for daybreak after incense (audio)		Oxford 1.10	Rahmia (devotions)
116	"Pure mountains that quake not have blessed thee" birkuk ṭuria dakiia ḏ-la-naidia	"Devotion" of Manda ḏ-Hiia for daybreak after incense (audio)		Oxford 1.11	Rahmia (devotions)
117	"I worship, praise and laud that Šrar" sagidna šahabana u-mšabana l-hak šrar	prayer in the Rahmia (Devotions) of the seventh hour after incense (audio)		Oxford 1.12	Rahmia (devotions)
118	"It is time to pray the "Devotions"" hua zibna l-mibia rahmia	prayer in the evening devotions after incense (audio)		Oxford 1.13	Rahmia (devotions)
119	"On Sunday, the first of days" b-habšaba b-riš iumia	hymn for Sunday (audio)		Oxford 1.14	Rahmia (devotions)
120	"My day — what is it amongst the days" iumai mahu b-iumia iuma	hymn for Sunday (audio)		Oxford 1.15	Rahmia (devotions)
121	"Before the Wellsprings were transmuted" mn qadmu ḏ-šinia ainia	hymn for Sunday (audio)		Oxford 1.16	Rahmia (devotions)
122	"O Lord of devotions" iamaria rahmia	hymn for Sunday		Oxford 1.17	Rahmia (devotions)
123	"Except for six or seven nations" l-bar mn šit u-šaba amamia	hymn for Sunday		Oxford 1.18	Rahmia (devotions)
124	"I seek a boon from the Life" ana buta mn hiia baiina	hymn for Sunday		Oxford 1.19	Rahmia (devotions)
125	"At the beginning of the construction" mn riš banana nipqit	hymn for Monday (audio)		Oxford 1.20	Rahmia (devotions)
126	"At the beginning of the pure Kimṣa" ʿl riš kimṣa dakia	hymn for Monday (audio)		Oxford 1.21	Rahmia (devotions)
127	"A Being, chosen, righteous, sprang up" gabra bhir zidqa nbaṭ u-anhar	hymn for Monday (audio)		Oxford 1.22	Rahmia (devotions)
128	"O Man, whom acclamation chose out" ia gabra ḏ-kaluza bhira	hymn for Monday		Oxford 1.23	Rahmia (devotions)
129	"Whither goest thou, chosen righteous One" lia azlit bhir zidqa	hymn for Monday		Oxford 1.24	Rahmia (devotions)
130	"On the day on which They opened the great gate of the Dwellings" mn iuma ḏ-pta baba rba ḏ-hilbunia	hymn for Monday		Oxford 1.25	Rahmia (devotions)
131	"Thou camest from the House of Life" ʿtit mn bit hiia	hymn for Tuesday		Oxford 1.26	Rahmia (devotions)
132	"Come, come, King of ʿUthras" ata ata malka ḏ-ʿutria	hymn for Tuesday		Oxford 1.27	Rahmia (devotions)
133	"Thou camest from the House of Good Beings" ʿtit mn bit ṭabia	hymn for Tuesday		Oxford 1.28	Rahmia (devotions)
134	"Come, come, King of ʿUthras" ata ata malka ḏ-ʿutria	hymn for Tuesday		Oxford 1.29	Rahmia (devotions)
135	"Fragrance came from its place" riha ata mn atrḥ	hymn for Tuesday		Oxford 1.30	Rahmia (devotions)
136	"Come, come, Manda ḏ-Hiia" ata ata manda ḏ-hiia	hymn for Tuesday		Oxford 1.31	Rahmia (devotions)
137	"There was a Cry in the firmament" qala hua b-ʿšumia	hymn for Wednesday (audio)		Oxford 1.32	Rahmia (devotions)
138	"The voice of a hidden Sprout" qala ḏ-nibṭa kasia	hymn for Wednesday (audio)		Oxford 1.33	Rahmia (devotions)
139	"I ascended the mountain Carmel" ʿl ṭur karmla silqit	hymn for Wednesday (audio)		Oxford 1.34	Rahmia (devotions)
140	"Between mountains twain" binia trin ṭuria	hymn for Wednesday		Oxford 1.35	Rahmia (devotions)
141	"Who will come, who will tell me" man ḏ-nitia u-man ḏ-nimarlia	hymn for Wednesday		Oxford 1.36	Rahmia (devotions)
142	"The advent of Hibil-ʿUthra" mitia ḏ-hibil ʿutra	hymn for Wednesday		Oxford 1.37	Rahmia (devotions)
143	"In the glory of my Father I stand" b-ziuḥ ḏ-ab qaiimna	hymn for Thursday (audio)		Oxford 1.38	Rahmia (devotions)
144	"By my pure radiance am I protected" ana b-ziuai dakia nṭirna	hymn for Thursday (audio)		Oxford 1.39	Rahmia (devotions)
145	"When the Mighty (Life) speaketh" kḏ mamlilia kabiria	hymn for Thursday (audio)		Oxford 1.40	Rahmia (devotions)
146	"I am preserved by my pure radiance" ana b-ziuai dakia nṭirna	hymn for Thursday		Oxford 1.41	Rahmia (devotions)
147	"Miserable I am, when shall I go?" ania ana l-ʿmat ʿzal	hymn for Thursday		Oxford 1.42	Rahmia (devotions)
148	"I am poor and submissive" ania ana u-midnina	hymn for Thursday		Oxford 1.43	Rahmia (devotions)
149	"At the door of the synagogue" ʿl baba ḏ-bit ama	hymn for Friday (audio)		Oxford 1.44	Rahmia (devotions)
150	"On the day that the great gate of the Dwellings opened" mn iuma ḏ-pta baba rba ḏ-hilbunia	hymn for Friday (audio)		Oxford 1.45	Rahmia (devotions)
151	"When will my Lord come from thee" l-ʿmat nitia marai minak	hymn for Friday (audio)		Oxford 1.46	Rahmia (devotions)
152	"Ye are uplifted and fortified" ʿtriṣtun u-ʿtqaiamtun	hymn for Friday		Oxford 1.47	Rahmia (devotions)
153	"A cleft was cloven in the earth" bidqa ʿbdiq b-tibil	hymn for Friday		Oxford 1.48	Rahmia (devotions)
154	"I have spoken and discoursed with my voice" malalit u-diršit b-qalai	hymn for Friday		Oxford 1.49	Rahmia (devotions)
155	"Stand by Me, be steadfast" ašar qumlia iadai	hymn for Saturday (audio)		Oxford 1.50	Rahmia (devotions)
156	"By the bank of the great Jordan of the First Life" ʿl kipḥ ḏ-iardna rba ḏ-hiia qadmaiia	hymn for Saturday (audio)		Oxford 1.51	Rahmia (devotions)
157	"To the mountains I say" l-ṭuria amarnalun	hymn for Saturday (audio)		Oxford 1.52	Rahmia (devotions)
158	"O shoot which sprouted within the Tanna" ia nibṭa ḏ-nbaṭ mn gu tana	hymn for Saturday		Oxford 1.53	Rahmia (devotions)
159	"The departure of the sabbath" mipaq šapta br maš	hymn for Saturday		Oxford 1.54	Rahmia (devotions)
160	"It revealed itself, and set off and came" ʿtiglia u-asgia u-ata	hymn for Saturday		Oxford 1.55	Rahmia (devotions)
161	"The outgoing of the sabbath with its night" mipaq šapta br maš	prayer for candidates for priesthood, on Saturday evening			Rahmia (devotions)
162	"At the going-out of sabbath" mipaq šapta br maš	prayer for candidates for priesthood, on Saturday evening			Rahmia (devotions)
163	"On Sunday, on the chief of days" b-habšaba b-riš iumia	prayer at the dawn of Sunday			Rahmia (devotions)
164	"I beheld a mountain" ṭura hzit	prayer at the dawn of Sunday			Rahmia (devotions)
165	"Poor am I! From the fruits" ania ana ḏ-man piria	prayer which is the fruit of ether (audio)		Oxford 1.56	Rahmia (devotions)
166	"The ʿUthras rejoice in His treasure" ʿutria b-ginza hadin	prayer which is the fruit of ether (audio)		Oxford 1.57	Rahmia (devotions)
167	"Thee, my Lord, do I worship" ana lak marai sagdanalak	prayer which is the fruit of ether (audio)		Oxford 1.58	Rahmia (devotions)
168	"Upon the Beginning of the great Ether of Life" ʿl riš aiar rba ḏ-hiia qaiimna	prayer which is the fruit of ether		Oxford 1.59	Rahmia (devotions)
169	"To thy name, Land (world) of Light" ʿl šumak arqa ḏ-nhura	prayer which is the fruit of ether		Oxford 1.60	Rahmia (devotions)
170	"Good is the Good for the good" ṭab ṭaba l-ṭabia	Ṭabahatan ("Our Ancestors") (audio)	411		Ṭabahatan (prayer for ancestors)
171	"Praised be the First Great Radiance" mšaba ziua rba qadmaia	Šal Šulta (audio)	257		Hymns of praise etc.
172	"Now (we beseech Thee), Life" tum mn hiia		258, 259 (different variants)		Hymns of praise etc.
173	"The name of the Life and the name of Manda ḏ-Hiia be pronounced upon thee" šuma ḏ-hiia u-šuma ḏ-manda ḏ-hiia madkar ʿlak	The Šumhata ("Names") (audio)			Šumhata (The "Names")
174	"I beseech the Life and my Lord Manda ḏ-Hiia" baiina mn hiia u-mn marai u-mn manda ḏ-hiia	(audio)			Hymns of praise etc.
175	"Then, when she reacheth the Seven Mysteries" haizak kḏ maṭia šuba razia	questioning of the soul	412 (variant)		Hymns of praise etc.
176	"O King of all kings, O Father of all ʿUthras" ia malka ḏ-kulhun malkia ia aba ḏ-kulhun ʿutria	King of all kings prayer (audio)			Hymns of praise etc.
177	"Vines shone in the water" anhar gupnia b-gu mia	prayer recited at the Little New Year's Feast; "Vines Hymn"	413		Little New Year’s Feast prayer
178	"Kušṭa strengthen thee, my crown" kušṭa asiak tagai	prayer for "honouring" the crown			Prayer for "honouring" the crown
179	"Come, Kušṭa, in kindness" ata b-ṭabu kušṭa	alphabetical prayer	206; Right Ginza 12.2; Wedding Part 2		Hymns for marriage
180	"ʿUthras assembled and Dwellings came together" knap ʿutria u-knap škinata		285; Wedding Part 2	Oxford 2.1	Hymns for marriage
181	"On the day that they clad Manda ḏ-Hiia in his vestment" b-iuma ḏ-libšiḥ manda ḏ-hiia l-lbušiḥ		286; Wedding Part 2	Oxford 2.2	Hymns for marriage
182	"On the day that they tied the girdle on Manda ḏ-Hiia" b-iuma ḏ-asarlḥ himiana l-manda ḏ-hiia		287; Wedding Part 2	Oxford 2.3	Hymns for marriage
183	"On the day that they invested Manda ḏ-Hiia with the tunic" b-iuma ḏ-nṣablḥ ksuia l-manda ḏ-hiia		288; Wedding Part 2	Oxford 2.4	Hymns for marriage
184	"On the day that they invested Manda ḏ-Hiia With the stole, Šamašiel" b-iuma ḏ-nṣablḥ šamšʿil naṣipa l-manda ḏ-hiia		289; Wedding Part 2	Oxford 2.5	Hymns for marriage
185	"On the day that they set the crown on Manda ḏ-Hiia" b-iuma ḏ-traṣlḥ taga l-manda ḏ-hiia		290; Wedding Part 2	Oxford 2.6	Hymns for marriage
186	"On the day that they invested Manda ḏ-Hiia with the Šarwala Nṣab" b-iuma ḏ-nṣablḥ nṣab šaruala l-manda ḏ-hiia		291; Wedding Part 2	Oxford 2.7	Hymns for marriage
187	"On the day that they invested Manda ḏ-Hiia with the staff (margna)" b-iuma ḏ-nṣablḥ margna l-manda ḏ-hiia		292; Wedding Part 2	Oxford 2.8	Hymns for marriage
188	"I twined a wreath of myrtle and marjoram" mn asa u-mn marmahuz klila gidlit		293; Wedding Part 2	Oxford 2.9	Hymns for marriage
189	"Who, amongst the ʿUthras, was it" hazin man mn ʿutria		294; Wedding Part 2	Oxford 2.10	Hymns for marriage
190	"Our father, they made thee chief in Tarwan" abun riša b-taruan šauiuk		295; Wedding Part 2	Oxford 2.11	Hymns for marriage
191	"On thee, our father, they have conferred a pure sovereignty" abun ʿhablak padakšar dakia		296; Wedding Part 2	Oxford 2.12	Hymns for marriage
192	"Who hath sent thee, new king" man šihlak malka hadta		297; Wedding Part 2	Oxford 2.13	Hymns for marriage
193	"Who sent thee, new king" man šihlak malka hadta		298; Wedding Part 2	Oxford 2.14	Hymns for marriage
194	"Our father, Šihlun-Ziwa, rejoiceth in his crown" abun šihlun ziua b-tagḥ hadia		299; Wedding Part 2	Oxford 2.15	Hymns for marriage
195	"Our father, They will guard thy wreath for thee" abun klilak ninaṭrunak		300; Wedding Part 2	Oxford 2.16	Hymns for marriage
196	"Our father, thy wreath is from the Vine Ruaz" abun klilak mn ruaz gupna		301; Wedding Part 2	Oxford 2.17	Hymns for marriage
197	"Planter of Plants, plant it" šatil šitlia šutlḥ		302; Wedding Part 2	Oxford 2.18	Hymns for marriage
198	"I am small amongst ʿUthras" zuṭanalun l-ʿutria		303; Wedding Part 2	Oxford 2.19	Hymns for marriage
199	"May pure guardians guard thee" ninaṭrunak naṭria dakiia		304; Wedding Part 2	Oxford 2.20	Hymns for marriage
200	"(Lo) the Voice of Life from the fruits" qal hiia mn piria		Wedding Part 3		Hymns for marriage
201	"O hang up light, let lamps of glory be hung up therein" ia talai ziua šragia ḏ-ziua tlibḥ		Wedding Part 3	Oxford 2.21, 22, 23	Hymns for marriage
202	"The radiance of Hibil is beauteous"" ziua ḏ-hibil iaiia		Wedding Part 3	Oxford 2.24, 25	Hymns for marriage
203	"This building, whose is it" hazin binta ḏ-manu		Wedding Part 3	Oxford 2.26, 27, 28, 29	Hymns for marriage
204	"They sent Hibil-Ziwa to make report unto the ʿUthras who sit there" šadruia l-hibil ziua l-maitilun paršigna l-ˁutria ḏ-hatam iatbia		Wedding Part 3	Oxford 2.30, 31	Hymns for marriage
205	"When the Proven One, the Pure One, went" kḏ azil bhira dakia		Wedding Part 3	Oxford 2.32, 33	Hymns for marriage
206			179; Right Ginza 12.2; Wedding Part 3		Hymns for marriage
207	"A Vehicle am I, a small one" ʿgla ana zuṭa		Wedding Part 3		Hymns for marriage
208	"His nuptial couch is spread for the bridegroom" puria mkiklḥ l-hiduia		Wedding Part 3		Hymns for marriage
209	"They bring in white flour by the khor (heap)" qahma b-kuria qaiil hiuartia		Wedding Part 3		Hymns for marriage
210	"Sun in his majesty bowed down before the bridegroom" šamiš b-rabutḥ sigudta qudam hiduia		Wedding Part 3		Hymns for marriage
211	"I and the bridegroom's groomsman" ana u-šušban hiduia		Wedding Part 3		Hymns for marriage
212	"There is a Vine for Šitil and a Tree for Anuš" gupna ʿtlḥ l-šitil u-ʿlana ʿtlḥ l-anuš		Wedding Part 3		Hymns for marriage
213	"I am a mana of the Great Life" mana ana ḏ-hiia rbia		Wedding Part 3		Hymns for marriage
214	"Thou art come, Pure Pearl, who hast illumined dark hearts" atat marganita dakita ḏ-anharat li-lbia haškia	alphabetical prayer	Right Ginza 12.4; Wedding Part 3		Hymns for marriage
215	"Lo the wicked degrade my people" ʿhai qašaplia ama bišia		Wedding Part 3 (18:3)		Hymns for marriage
216	"Behold, my portal" ʿhai ia dargai		Wedding Part 3 (18:8)		Hymns for marriage
217	"Lo, my little mistress, that standeth above the room" ʿhai ia rabituia ʿṣṭartia ḏ-ʿlauia gurpia qaima		Wedding Part 3 (18:13)		Hymns for marriage
218	"Lo, my little mistress, daughter of the king's Chief Gardener" ʿhai ia rabituia ʿṣṭartia pt bustambanaia ḏ-malkia		Wedding Part 3 (18:17)		Hymns for marriage
219	"Lo, my little mistress, daughter of the king's Chief Gardener" ʿhai ia rabituia ʿṣṭartia pt bustambanai ḏ-malka		Wedding Part 3 (18:20)		Hymns for marriage
220	"Lo, my little mistress, his baggy trousers (lie) beside thy slippers!" ʿhai ia rabituia ʿṣṭartia šarualḥ gambia msanik		Wedding Part 3 (18:23)		Hymns for marriage
221	"Lo, my little mistress, that earnest the burnished mirror" ʿhai ia rabituia ʿṣṭartia ḏ-drʿia naura sqila		Wedding Part 3 (18:27)		Hymns for marriage
222	"Lo, O thou (bride) that glitterest (with gold)" ʿhai ia ṭauasta ḏ-zahba		Wedding Part 3 (18:30)		Hymns for marriage
223	"Whose daughter art thou" brata ḏ-man anat		Wedding Part 3 (19:1)		Hymns for marriage
224	"From the day that the great 'Uraš came for her" mn iuma ḏ-ʿuraš rba atalia		Wedding Part 3 (19:4)		Hymns for marriage
225	"Bridegroom, who told thee" hiduia man ḏ-amarlak		Wedding Part 3 (19:7)		Hymns for marriage
226	"Who wedded the bridegroom" man ḏ-araslḥ l-hiduia		Wedding Part 3 (19:11)		Hymns for marriage
227	"Hibil-Ziwa hath blessed you" brakinkun hibil ziua		Wedding Part 3 (19:16)		Hymns for marriage
228	"One of my hands beneath his head" hda ʿdai atutia rišiḥ		Wedding Part 3 (19:25)		Hymns for marriage
229	"Standing beneath the palm-tree" atutia diqla qaima		Wedding Part 3 (19:27)		Hymns for marriage
230	"Ye are sealed with the seal of Life" htimitun b-ʿsqat hiia		Wedding Part 3 (19:23)		Hymns for marriage
231	"A thousand set your table" ṭariankun alpa triṣiḥ		Wedding Part 3 (19:antepenult.)		Hymns for marriage
232	"Pure guardians watch over you" ninaṭrunak naṭria dakiia		Wedding Part 3 (19:ult.)		Hymns for marriage
233	"To the Place which is all Radiance" l-atra ḏ-kula ziua		261; Wedding Part 3	Oxford 3.1	Hymns for a new priest (kḏ azil bhira dakia)
234	"To the Place which giveth out light" l-atra ḏ-nhura ḏ-nahar		262; Wedding Part 3	Oxford 3.2	Hymns for a new priest (kḏ azil bhira dakia)
235	"To the Tana of glory" la l-tana ḏ-ʿqara		263; Wedding Part 3	Oxford 3.3	Hymns for a new priest (kḏ azil bhira dakia)
236	"To the Place where His appearance is lustrous" l-atra ḏ-taqna dmuta parṣupa nahria		264; Wedding Part 3	Oxford 3.4	Hymns for a new priest (kḏ azil bhira dakia)
237	"To the place where His converse is calm" l-atra ḏ-niha ṣauta		265; Wedding Part 3	Oxford 3.5, 6	Hymns for a new priest (kḏ azil bhira dakia)
238	"To the Mighty-in-Glory, to the Well-Ordered and Well-Ordering" aluat rurbia ʿqara aluat sdiria u-msadria		266; Wedding Part 3	Oxford 3.7	Hymns for a new priest (kḏ azil bhira dakia)
239	"To the place of pure wrappings" l-atra ḏ-ṭarṭabuna dakia		267; Wedding Part 3	Oxford 3.8	Hymns for a new priest (kḏ azil bhira dakia)
240	"To the Place where dwelleth the pure perfected Being" l-atra ḏ-iatbiba tušlimia dakiia		268; Wedding Part 3	Oxford 3.9	Hymns for a new priest (kḏ azil bhira dakia)
241	"To the Place which was self-created" l-atra ḏ-ʿbar mn napšaihun		269; Wedding Part 3		Hymns for a new priest (kḏ azil bhira dakia)
242	"To the Place which is all radiance" l-atra ḏ-kula ziua		270; Wedding Part 3		Hymns for a new priest (kḏ azil bhira dakia)
243	"Pure is the place, there is no grief in it" l-atra hu dakia ḏ-nṭiṭuta litba		271; Wedding Part 3	Oxford 3.10	Hymns for a new priest (kḏ azil bhira dakia)
244	"I will speak to Thee, Mystic Perfection" ʿmarlkun tušlimia kasiia		272; Wedding Part 3	Oxford 3.11, 12	Hymns for a new priest (kḏ azil bhira dakia)
245	"To the Place where the Almighty empowereth Itself and its Presence" l-atra ḏ-kabira kabralun napšaihun u-taqun		273; Wedding Part 3	Oxford 3.13	Hymns for a new priest (kḏ azil bhira dakia)
246	"When, filled with innocency and bright in all his goodness" kḏ mlia b-zakuta u-manharba b-kula ṭabuta		274; Wedding Part 3	Oxford 3.14	Hymns for a new priest (kḏ azil bhira dakia)
247	"The Chosen One, whose vesture becometh him" bhira ḏ-ʿṣṭla iaʿila		275; Wedding Part 3		Hymns for a new priest (kḏ azil bhira dakia)
248	"Great is he, the good (spirit)" rba hu ṭaba luat abahata		276; Wedding Part 3		Hymns for a new priest (kḏ azil bhira dakia)
249	"To the Place where dwelleth the Perfected" l-atra ḏ-tušlimia iatbia		277; Wedding Part 3		Hymns for a new priest (kḏ azil bhira dakia)
250	"To the Place where the sound of His voice is mild" l-atra ḏ-niha ṣauta		278; Wedding Part 3	Oxford 3.15	Hymns for a new priest (kḏ azil bhira dakia)
251	"To the Place where deeply reverenced is His steadfast Form" l-atra ḏ-iaqir miqar u-dmuta taqna		279; Wedding Part 3	Oxford 3.16	Hymns for a new priest (kḏ azil bhira dakia)
252	"To the Place where His speech is pleasant" l-atra ḏ-mimra basim		280; Wedding Part 3		Hymns for a new priest (kḏ azil bhira dakia)
253	"To the place of Safe-keeping" l-atra ḏ-naṭarta ḏ-maprišalun		281; Wedding Part 3	Oxford 3.17, 18	Hymns for a new priest (kḏ azil bhira dakia)
254	"To go and to perform his works" l-mizal u-mibar ʿbidata		282; Wedding Part 3		Hymns for a new priest (kḏ azil bhira dakia)
255	"To the place of veiled radiance" l-atra ḏ-ksia ziua		283; Wedding Part 3	Oxford 3.19 (first half)	Hymns for a new priest (kḏ azil bhira dakia)
256	"To the place in which the Transcendent abideth" l-atra ḏ-nukraia ḏ-šriba		284; Wedding Part 3	Oxford 3.19 (second half)	Hymns for a new priest (kḏ azil bhira dakia)
258	"Then from (You), Life, (I ask) Your pity" tum mn hiia		172, 259 (different variants)		Hymns for marriage
259	"Then from (You), Life, (I ask) Your pity" tum mn hiia		172, 258 (different variants)		Hymns for marriage
260	"In the name of the Great Ineffable Life from worlds of light" b-šumaihun ḏ-hiia rbia nukraiia mn almia ḏ-nhura				Hymns for marriage
257			171		Hymns for a new priest (kḏ azil bhira dakia)
261			233		Hymns for a new priest (kḏ azil bhira dakia)
262			234		Hymns for a new priest (kḏ azil bhira dakia)
263			235		Hymns for a new priest (kḏ azil bhira dakia)
264			236		Hymns for a new priest (kḏ azil bhira dakia)
265			237		Hymns for a new priest (kḏ azil bhira dakia)
266			238		Hymns for a new priest (kḏ azil bhira dakia)
267			239		Hymns for a new priest (kḏ azil bhira dakia)
268			240		Hymns for a new priest (kḏ azil bhira dakia)
269			241		Hymns for a new priest (kḏ azil bhira dakia)
270			242		Hymns for a new priest (kḏ azil bhira dakia)
271			243		Hymns for a new priest (kḏ azil bhira dakia)
272			244		Hymns for a new priest (kḏ azil bhira dakia)
273			245		Hymns for a new priest (kḏ azil bhira dakia)
274			246		Hymns for a new priest (kḏ azil bhira dakia)
275			247		Hymns for a new priest (kḏ azil bhira dakia)
276			248		Hymns for a new priest (kḏ azil bhira dakia)
277			249		Hymns for a new priest (kḏ azil bhira dakia)
278			250		Hymns for a new priest (kḏ azil bhira dakia)
279			251		Hymns for a new priest (kḏ azil bhira dakia)
280			252		Hymns for a new priest (kḏ azil bhira dakia)
281			253		Hymns for a new priest (kḏ azil bhira dakia)
282			254		Hymns for a new priest (kḏ azil bhira dakia)
283			255		Hymns for a new priest (kḏ azil bhira dakia)
284			256		Hymns for a new priest (kḏ azil bhira dakia)
285			180		Hymns for marriage
286			181		Hymns for marriage
287			182		Hymns for marriage
288			183		Hymns for marriage
289			184		Hymns for marriage
290			185		Hymns for marriage
291			186		Hymns for marriage
292			187		Hymns for marriage
293			188		Hymns for marriage
294			189		Hymns for marriage
295			190		Hymns for marriage
296			191		Hymns for marriage
297			192		Hymns for marriage
298			193		Hymns for marriage
299			194		Hymns for marriage
300			195		Hymns for marriage
301			196		Hymns for marriage
302			197		Hymns for marriage
303			198		Hymns for marriage
304			199		Hymns for marriage
305	"Jordans formed themselves at his right" ʿṣṭarar l-iamina iardnia	prayer of placing the crown on a postulant	387		Coronation prayers and hymns
306	"Treasure of Life (Simat-hiia) shone therein"	prayer of placing the crown on a postulant	388		Coronation prayers and hymns
307	"The jordans, frolicking and dancing"	prayer of placing the crown on a postulant	389		Coronation prayers and hymns
308	"The jordans all assembled, and Rays-of-light"	prayer of placing the crown on a postulant	390		Coronation prayers and hymns
309	"Rays-of-light summon the kings" pasimka l-malkia mqarilun	prayer of placing the crown on a postulant	391		Coronation prayers and hymns
310	"Channels of light were formed therein" agia ḏ-nhura ʿṣṭria	prayer of placing the crown on a postulant	392		Coronation prayers and hymns
311	"Upon the Teacher of ʿUthras, Šišlam-Rba" ʿṣṭarar l-iamina iardna	prayer of placing the crown on a postulant	393		Coronation prayers and hymns
312	"Blessed is this pure voice and blessed your planting" brik hazin qala dakia	antiphonal hymn	394		Coronation prayers and hymns
313	"O king, thou art a mirror" ia malka anat naura	antiphonal hymn	395		Coronation prayers and hymns
314	"How wondrous is the strength of the Great (Life)" kma šanai haila ḏ-rbia	antiphonal hymn	396		Coronation prayers and hymns
315	"Our father, thou art a king, a son of kings" abun malka anat br malkia	antiphonal hymn	397		Coronation prayers and hymns
316	"Hail to him! Again, hail to the king of kings" ṭubḥ tum ṭubḥ l-malka	antiphonal hymn	398		Coronation prayers and hymns
317	"Thou art the Teacher of ganzibria" rbaihun anat ḏ-ganzibria	antiphonal hymn	398		Coronation prayers and hymns
318	"My day, what is it amongst days" iumai mahu b-iumia	antiphonal hymn	399		Coronation prayers and hymns
319	"Thy strength shall increase, our father"		400		Coronation prayers and hymns
320	"On the day that they set the crown on the king" b-iuma ḏ-taga triṣ l-malka		401		Coronation prayers and hymns
321	"On the day that the kings assembled"		402		Coronation prayers and hymns
322	"On the day that a vision was verified by eyes" b-iuma ḏ-mahzita tiqnat b-ainia		403		Coronation prayers and hymns
323	"Shine forth, give out light, pure Mirror" nhar nhar naura dakia		404		Coronation prayers and hymns
324	"Thou enlightenest them by thy word(s)"		405		Coronation prayers and hymns
325	"The Great (Life) rejoiced, It was glad" hdin rbia hdin		406		Coronation prayers and hymns
326	"Our father, thou art a pure mirror" abun naura anat dakia		407		Coronation prayers and hymns
327	"On the day that Myrtle emerged from the Wellspring" mn iuma asa praš		408		Coronation prayers and hymns
328	"Blessed be this škinta of the Mighty (Life)" brika hazin škinta ḏ-kabir		409		Coronation prayers and hymns
329	"Oh a burnished treasure art thou" ia ginza anat sqila		386	Oxford 4.20	Coronation prayers and hymns
330	"When radiance came forth the white land, Paris" kḏ npaq ziua mn paris	(audio)		Oxford 4.1	Banner prayers and hymns
331	"On the day that Šišlam-Rba unfurled his banner" mn iuma ḏ-nigdḥ šišlam rba l-drabšiḥ	(audio)		Oxford 4.2	Banner prayers and hymns
332	"On the day that Šišlam-Rba unfurled his banner" mn iuma ḏ-nigdḥ šišlam rba l-drabšiḥ	(audio)		Oxford 4.3	Banner prayers and hymns
333	"On the day that Sišlam-Rba shook out the banner Pirun" mn iuma ḏ-nipṣḥ šišlam rba l-pirun drabša	(audio)		Oxford 4.4	Banner prayers and hymns
334	"On the day that the banner Šišlamiel was unfurled" mn iuma ḏ-ʿtingid šišlamʿil drabša	(audio)		Oxford 4.5	Banner prayers and hymns
335	"On the day that Bihram the Great unfurled the banner Šišlamiel" mn iuma ḏ-nigdḥ bihram rba ʿl šišlamʿil drabša	(audio)		Oxford 4.6	Banner prayers and hymns
336	"On the day that Šišlam-Rba unfurled his banner" mn iuma ḏ-nigdḥ šišlam rba l-drabšiḥ	(audio)		Oxford 4.7	Banner prayers and hymns
337	"It hath risen, it hath shone forth" dna dna ziuak	(audio)		Oxford 4.8, Oxford 4.9	Banner prayers and hymns
338	"Hibil blessed thee with a great blessing" hibil birkak b-birkta rabtia	(audio)		Oxford 4.10	Banner prayers and hymns
339	"The Chosen Righteous rose to their feet" bhiria zidqa qam ʿl ligraihun	(audio)		Oxford 4.11	Banner prayers and hymns
340	"Who took up the banner Zihrun" man nisbḥ l-zihrun drabša	(audio)		Oxford 4.12	Banner prayers and hymns
341	"Yawar took up the banner Šišlamiel" iauar nisbḥ l-šišlamʿil drabša	(audio)		Oxford 4.13	Banner prayers and hymns
342	"Shine forth, let Yawar's radiance shine forth" dna dna ziuḥ ḏ-iauar ʿl iardna dna	(audio)		Oxford 4.14	Banner prayers and hymns
343	"As head of the three Škinata" b-riš tlat škinata	(audio)		Oxford 4.15	Banner prayers and hymns
344	"The Great (Life) rejoiced; It rejoiced when Yawar looked" hdun rbia hdun ḏ-skalḥ iauar	(audio)		Oxford 4.16	Banner prayers and hymns
345	"On the day that ʿUthras put into Order" b-iuma ḏ-ʿutria sidruia	(audio)		Oxford 4.17	Banner prayers and hymns
346	"On the day that great Bihram furled his banner" b-iuma ḏ-kirkḥ bihram rba l-drabšia	(audio)		Oxford 4.18	Banner prayers and hymns
347	"On the day that the radiance of the banner Šašlamiel" b-iuma ḏ-ʿtiksia ziua ḏ-šišlamʿil drabša	(audio)		Oxford 4.19	Banner prayers and hymns
348	"On the day that Ayar (Ether, Air) emerged from the Wellspring" mn iuma ḏ-praš aiar mn ainia mia				Blessed Oblation prayers and hymns
349	"Come, come, lofty messenger" ata ata šganda				Blessed Oblation prayers and hymns
350	"On the day that a root of fresh myrtle" b-iuma ḏ-širša ḏ-asa				Blessed Oblation prayers and hymns
351	"This is the Blessed Oblation" hazin zidqa brika				Blessed Oblation prayers and hymns
352	"I am the white Pihta" pihta ana hiuara				Blessed Oblation prayers and hymns
353	"The white Pihta am I" pihta ana hiuara				Blessed Oblation prayers and hymns
354	"I am the white Pihta" pihta ana hiuara				Blessed Oblation prayers and hymns
355	"The white Pihta am I" pihta ana hiuara				Blessed Oblation prayers and hymns
356	"The voice of Manda ḏ-Hiia calling to the chosen righteous" qala ḏ-manda ḏ-hiia l-bhiria zidqa mqarilun				Blessed Oblation prayers and hymns
357	"Behold my oblation, behold my oblation" ṭabta hzun zidqai hzun				Blessed Oblation prayers and hymns
358	"When He opened His Garment and when Radiance was formed" kḏ pta lbuša u-kḏ ziua ʿṣṭarar				Blessed Oblation prayers and hymns
359	"When He opened His Garment and when Radiance was formed" kḏ pta lbuša u-kḏ ziua ʿṣṭarar				Blessed Oblation prayers and hymns
360	"When He opened His Garment and when Radiance was formed" kḏ pta lbuša u-kḏ ziua ʿṣṭarar				Blessed Oblation prayers and hymns
361	"When He opened His Garment and when Radiance was formed" kḏ pta lbuša u-kḏ ziua ʿṣṭarar				Blessed Oblation prayers and hymns
362	"When He opened His Garment and when Radiance was formed" kḏ pta lbuša u-kḏ ziua ʿṣṭarar				Blessed Oblation prayers and hymns
363	"When He opened His Garment and when Radiance was formed" kḏ pta lbuša u-kḏ ziua ʿṣṭarar				Blessed Oblation prayers and hymns
364	"When He opened His Garment and when Radiance was formed" kḏ pta lbuša u-kḏ ziua ʿṣṭarar				Blessed Oblation prayers and hymns
365	"When He opened His Garment and when Radiance was formed" kḏ pta lbuša u-kḏ ziua ʿṣṭarar				Blessed Oblation prayers and hymns
366	"When He opened His Garment and when Radiance was formed" kḏ pta lbuša u-kḏ ziua ʿṣṭarar				Blessed Oblation prayers and hymns
367	"When He opened His Garment and when Radiance was formed" kḏ pta lbuša u-kḏ ziua ʿṣṭarar				Blessed Oblation prayers and hymns
368	"When He opened His Garment and when Radiance was formed" kḏ pta lbuša u-kḏ ziua ʿṣṭarar				Blessed Oblation prayers and hymns
369	"When He opened His Garment and when Radiance was formed" kḏ pta lbuša u-kḏ ziua ʿṣṭarar				Blessed Oblation prayers and hymns
370	"They appointed, and the Body consisteth of Radiance"				Blessed Oblation prayers and hymns
371	"At the Source of the great Stream" l-riš širiana				Blessed Oblation prayers and hymns
372	"At thy name, Predestinate One" l-šumik ʿtita / ʿtita ḏ-hiia				Blessed Oblation prayers and hymns
373	"And in the name of the Manda ḏ-Hiia" u-b-šuma ḏ-manda ḏ-hiia				Blessed Oblation prayers and hymns
374	"In pure raiment do I stand" ba-lbuš dakia qaiimna				Blessed Oblation prayers and hymns
375	"I have blessed, my Lord, all the good things" brikit marai l-kulhun ṭabauata	petition of "The great Father of Glory", for a bridegroom			Blessings after Blessed Oblation
376	"Now thou shalt be blessed, our father"				Blessings after Blessed Oblation
377	"And they address a hymn to him: The Egg, the Hidden Mystery, hath blessed thee" niana nirmula hilbuna raza kasia birkak				Blessings after Blessed Oblation
378	"May there be health, purity, joy of heart and forgiving of sin"	prayer for the blessed "priest's portion"			Blessings after Blessed Oblation
379	"Thy propitiatory gift shall provide thy portion" asuta u-zakuta u-šabiq haṭaiia nihuilia l-dilia				Blessings after Blessed Oblation
380	"I worship, praise and laud that great mystic First Jordan" sagidna šahabana u-mšabana l-hak iardna rba kasia qadmaia				Blessings after Blessed Oblation
381	"Darkness is crushed back into the Dark" kbiš hšuka b-ʿma				Blessings after Blessed Oblation
382	"Vines shone in the waters" nhar gupnia b-gu mia				Myrtle prayers and hymns
383	"On the day that Hibil-Ziwa walked with Yawar" b-iuma ḏ-asgia hibil aluat iauar				Myrtle prayers and hymns
384	"Myrtle, myrtle! The king took it" asa asa malka nisbḥ				Myrtle prayers and hymns
385	"All who inhale thy perfume and are crowned by thee"				Myrtle prayers and hymns
386		hymn for consecration of crowns on Sunday	329		Coronation prayers and hymns
387		hymn of the Great Šišlam	305		Coronation prayers and hymns
388		hymn of the Great Šišlam	306		Coronation prayers and hymns
389		hymn of the Great Šišlam	307		Coronation prayers and hymns
390		hymn of the Great Šišlam	308		Coronation prayers and hymns
391		hymn of the Great Šišlam	309		Coronation prayers and hymns
392		hymn of the Great Šišlam	310		Coronation prayers and hymns
393		hymn of the Great Šišlam	311		Coronation prayers and hymns
394			312		Coronation prayers and hymns
395			313		Coronation prayers and hymns
396			314		Coronation prayers and hymns
397			315		Coronation prayers and hymns
398			316–317		Coronation prayers and hymns
399			318		Coronation prayers and hymns
400			319		Coronation prayers and hymns
401			320		Coronation prayers and hymns
402			321		Coronation prayers and hymns
403			322		Coronation prayers and hymns
404			323		Coronation prayers and hymns
405			324		Coronation prayers and hymns
406			325		Coronation prayers and hymns
407			326		Coronation prayers and hymns
408			327		Coronation prayers and hymns
409			328		Coronation prayers and hymns
410	"Health, victory and forgiving of sins be there for me" asuta u-zakuta u-šabiq haṭaiia nihuilia	Yahia's Petition ("John's Prayer")			Prayer of Yahia
411	"Our forefathers, there shall be forgiving of sins for them"	chant of "Our forefathers"	170		Miscellaneous hymns
412	"Then, when she (the soul) reacheth the seven mysteries" haizak kḏ maṭia šuba razia	questioning of the soul	175 (variant)		Miscellaneous hymns
413			177		Miscellaneous hymns
414	"On the day when the radiance within Radiance"	bridegroom prayer			Miscellaneous hymns

== See also ==
- Qulasta
- Sidra d-Nishmata
