= Shal Shulta =

Prayer in Mandaeism

The Shal Shulta (Classical Mandaic: ࡔࡀࡋ ࡔࡅࡋࡕࡀ, romanized: Šal Šulta) is a commonly recited prayer in Mandaeism. It is numbered as Prayer 171 in E. S. Drower's version of the Qulasta, which was based on manuscript 53 of the Drower Collection (abbreviated DC 53).

The Ṭabahatan (Prayer 170) directly precedes the Shal Shulta prayer.

== Contents ==
The prayer begins with the lines, "Praised be the First Great Radiance" (Classical Mandaic: ࡌࡔࡀࡁࡀ ࡆࡉࡅࡀ ࡓࡁࡀ ࡒࡀࡃࡌࡀࡉࡀ, romanized: mšaba ziua rba qadmaia).

The prayer starts with praising the:

- radiance (ziua) (mšaba ziua rba qadmaia)
- light (nhura) (mšaba nhura rba qadmaia)
- wellspring (aina) and date palm (sindirka) (mšaba aina u-sindirka rba qadmaia)
- source (tana/kana) (Note: Gelbert & Lofts (2025) suggest that tana may have in fact been a misreading of kana.) (mšaba tana kasia ḏ-b-gu aina rabtia kasita qadmaita šria)
- Shishlam Rabba (mšaba šišlam rba ḏ-l-kipa ḏ-aina u-sindirka iatib)
- Ezlat Rabtia (mšaba ʿzlat rabtia)
- Yawar (mšaba iauar rba ḏ-mn kanpia ḏ-ziua ʿṣṭarar)
- Simat Hayyi (mšaba simat hiia ʿmaihun ḏ-kulhun malkia, ḏ-mina hun ḏ-kulhun almia, ḏ-mn himat razia kasiia ʿpiršat)
- Yardna (mšaba hak iardna rba qadmaia)
- 360 Yardnia
- Shkinta (mšaba hak škinta rabtia kasita qadmaita)

Afterwards, admonitions from Yawar are mentioned. Finally, Habshaba (Sunday), Bihram Rabba, Abatur Rama, Mahziel (the first great word), Haia-Šum, Yawar Rabba, and Yur Rabba are addressed in lengthier invocations.

== See also ==
- Brakha (daily prayer in Mandaeism)
- Asut Malkia
- Tabahatan
- Shumhata
- Rahma (Mandaeism)
- Qulasta
- List of Qulasta prayers
