= Shumhata =

Prayer in Mandaeism

The Shumhata (Classical Mandaic: ࡔࡅࡌࡄࡀࡕࡀ, romanized: Šumhata, lit. 'Names') is a commonly recited prayer in Mandaeism.

The Shumhata is numbered as Prayer 173 in E. S. Drower's version of the Qulasta, which was based on manuscript 53 of the Drower Collection (abbreviated DC 53).

== The Shumhata prayer ==
Like the Asut Malkia, the Shumhata is a litany which lists following the names (in Drower's 1959 version). The Mandaic below in parentheses has been transliterated from Al-Mubaraki (2010).

1. Hayyi Rabbi and Manda d-Hayyi (šuma ḏ-hiia u-šuma ḏ-manda ḏ-hiia madkar ʿlak)
2. aina (well-spring) (šuma ḏ-aina rabtia kasita qadmaita madkar ʿlak)
3. sindirka (date palm or sandarac tree) (šuma ḏ-sindirka rba qadmaia madkar ʿlak)
4. Šišlam Rba (šuma ḏ-šišlam rba madkar ʿlak)
5. Ezlat Rabtia (šuma ḏ-ʿzlat rabtia madkar ʿlak)
6. Yawar Rba (šuma ḏ-iauar rba madkar ʿlak)
7. Simat Hiia (šuma ḏ-simat hiia madkar ʿlak)
8. Yukabar Rba (šuma ḏ-iukabar rba madkar ʿlak)
9. Mana and his counterpart (šuma ḏ-mana u-dmuta madkar ʿlak)
10. Great Mystery, the mystic Word (šuma ḏ-raza rba pugdama kasia madkar ʿlak)
11. S'haq Ziwa Rba Qadmaia (šuma ḏ-shaq ziua rba qadmaia madkar ʿlak)
12. Sam Ziwa (šuma ḏ-sam ziua dakia bukra habiba rba qadmaia madkar ʿlak)
13. Hayyi Rabbi and Manda d-Hayyi (second repetition) (šuma ḏ-hiia u-šuma ḏ-manda ḏ-hiia madkar ʿlak)

Each of the names is preceded by "[the] name of" (Classical Mandaic: ࡔࡅࡌࡀ ࡖ, romanized: šuma ḏ-) and followed by the phrase "is pronounced upon thee" (Classical Mandaic: ࡌࡀࡃࡊࡀࡓ ࡏࡋࡀࡊ, romanized: madkar ʿlak). This list of names, which is also repeated in the commentary of Prayer 18 of the Qulasta, is followed by a request to be protected from illnesses and misfortunes.

A similar litany prayer that comes after the Shumhata is the King of Kings (malka ḏ-kulhun malkia) prayer, which is Prayer 176 of the Qulasta.

== See also ==
- Brakha (daily prayer in Mandaeism)
- Asut Malkia
- Tabahatan
- Shal Shulta
- Rushuma
- Rahma (Mandaeism)
- Qulasta
- List of Qulasta prayers
- Rishama (ablution)
- Tamasha (ablution)
