= Rushuma =

Prayer in Mandaeism

The rushuma (Classical Mandaic: ࡓࡅࡔࡅࡌࡀ, romanized: rušuma, lit. 'sign'; sometimes also spelled rushma or rušma, Modern Mandaic pronunciation: [ˈroʃma]) is one of the most commonly recited prayers in Mandaeism. It is a "signing" prayer recited during daily ablutions (rishama). The same word can also be used to refer to the ritual signing gesture associated with the prayer.

The rushuma is numbered as Prayer 104 in E. S. Drower's version of the Qulasta, which was based on manuscript 53 of the Drower Collection (abbreviated DC 53). In Drower's ordering, the Asut Malkia prayer (CP 105) follows the rushuma prayer, while the ʿniana ("response") prayers come before the rushuma.

== Signing ==
Rushuma or rushma literally means "sign" or "signing" (ritual gesture). Many lines in the prayer are repeated three times as the reciter signs the rushuma front of the face with his or her fingers.

== Mandaic text and translation ==
Below is the transliterated Mandaic text of the Rushuma prayer, based on Majid Fandi Al-Mubaraki's Qulasta (volume 2) as edited by Matthew Morgenstern and Ohad Abudraham in the Comprehensive Aramaic Lexicon. The English translation is original.

Mandaic transliteration

kušṭa asinkun
b-šumaihun ḏ-hiia rbia
asuta u-zakuta nihuilak
ia ab abuhun malka piriauis
iardna rba ḏ-mia hiia
b-šumaihun ḏ-hiia rbia
halilnin ˁdan b-kušṭa
u-span b-haimanuta
u-malilnin b-malalia ḏ-ziua
u-ˁshiṭabun b-ˁuṣrai ḏ-nhura
brik šumak u-mšaba šumak
marai manda ḏ-hiia
brik u-mšaba hak parṣupa rba ḏ-ˁqara ḏ-mn napšia praš
(tlata zibnia)
ana plan br planita
ršimna b-rušma ḏ-hiia
šuma ḏ-hiia u-šuma ḏ-manda ḏ-hiia madkar ˁlai
(tlata zibnia)
ˁudnai šamun qala ḏ-hiia
(tlata zibnia)
nhirai arih riha ḏ-hiia
(tlata zibnia)
rušumai ˁlauai
la-hua b-nura
u-la-hua b-miša
u-la-hua ḏ-mšiha mša
rušumai b-iardna rba ḏ-mia hiia ḏ-ˁniš b-hailia la-mṣia
šuma ḏ-hiia u-šuma ḏ-manda ḏ-hiia madkar ˁlai
kbiš hšuka u-triṣ nhura
šuma ḏ-hiia u-šuma ḏ-manda ḏ-hiia madkar ˁlai
pumai buta u-tušbihta mla
(tlata zibnia)
b-urkai marbika u-sagda l-hiia rbia
(tlata zibnia)
ligrai madrika dirkia ḏ-kušṭa u-haimanuta
(tlata zibnia)
ana plan br planita
ṣbina b-maṣbuta ḏ-bihram rba br rurbia
maṣbutai tinaṭrai u-tisaq l-riš
šuma ḏ-hiia u-šuma ḏ-manda ḏ-hiia madkar ˁlai
(tlata zibnia)
ligrai ˁdaihun ḏ-šuba u-trisar la-tištalaṭ ˁlai
šuma ḏ-hiia u-šuma ḏ-manda ḏ-hiia madkar ˁlai

English translation

May Kushta give you strength.
In the name of Hayyi Rabbi.
May healing and victory be upon you.
O my Father, their Father, King Piriawis,
Great Yardna of the Living Water.
In the name of Hayyi Rabbi.
We have purified our hands with Kushta,
and our lips with Faith,
and we have spoken words of Ziwa,
and my mind is immersed in Light.
May your name be blessed, and may your name be praised,
my Lord Manda d-Hayyi.
May that Great Countenance of Glory, which originated from itself, be blessed and praised.
(three times)
I, N son of N,
am signed with the rušma of Hayyi.
May the name of Hayyi and the name of Manda d-Hayyi be pronounced upon me.
(three times)
My ears have heard the call of Hayyi.
(three times)
My nose has breathed the riha of Hayyi.
(three times)
My rušuma, given to me,
was not in the fire,
was not in the oil,
and was not of the anointment of Mšiha.
My rušuma is in the Great Yardna of Living Water, of which none can attain its powers.
May the name of Hayyi and the name of Manda d-Hayyi be pronounced upon me.
Darkness is defeated, and Light is established.
May the name of Hayyi and the name of Manda d-Hayyi be pronounced upon me.
My mouth is filled with prayer (buta) and praise.
(three times)
My knees bless and worship Hayyi Rabbi.
(three times)
My feet walk the paths of Kushta and Faith.
(three times)
I, N son of N,
am baptized with the maṣbuta of Bihram Rabba, son of the Mighty.
My maṣbuta will protect me and bring me forward.
May the name of Hayyi and the name of Manda d-Hayyi be pronounced upon me.
(three times)
The feet and the hands of the Seven and Twelve will not be able to dominate me.
May the name of Hayyi and the name of Manda d-Hayyi be pronounced upon me.

== Use in ritual procedures ==
Each part of the rushuma corresponds to each of the following rishama ritual procedures.

Rushuma prayer text (Mandaic transliteration)	Rishama ritual procedure
kušṭa asinkun b-šumaihun ḏ-hiia rbia asuta u-zakuta nihuilak ia ab abuhun malka piriauis iardna rba ḏ-mia hiia	while approaching the river
b-šumaihun ḏ-hiia rbia halilnin ˁdan b-kušṭa u-span b-haimanuta u-malilnin b-malalia ḏ-ziua u-ˁshiṭabun b-ˁuṣrai ḏ-nhura	stoop and wash hands
brik šumak u-mšaba šumak marai manda ḏ-hiia brik u-mšaba hak parṣupa rba ḏ-ˁqara ḏ-mn napšia praš (tlata zibnia)	wash the face three times, taking water in the hands
ana plan br planita ršimna b-rušma ḏ-hiia šuma ḏ-hiia u-šuma ḏ-manda ḏ-hiia madkar ˁlai (tlata zibnia)	take water in the hand and sign from ear to ear across the forehead, from right to left
ˁudnai šamun qala ḏ-hiia (tlata zibnia)	three times, dip two fingers in the river and cleanse the ears
nhirai arih riha ḏ-hiia (tlata zibnia)	take water into the palm, snuff it three times up into the nose
rušumai ˁlauai la-hua b-nura u-la-hua b-miša u-la-hua ḏ-mšiha mša rušumai b-iardna rba ḏ-mia hiia ḏ-ˁniš b-hailia la-mṣia šuma ḏ-hiia u-šuma ḏ-manda ḏ-hiia madkar ˁlai kbiš hšuka u-triṣ nhura šuma ḏ-hiia u-šuma ḏ-manda ḏ-hiia madkar ˁlai	wash the lower part of the body
ušbihta mla (tlata zibnia)	take water into the mouth from the palm, rinsing it out three times
b-urkai marbika u-sagda l-hiia rbia (tlata zibnia)	wash the knees three times
ligrai madrika dirkia ḏ-kušṭa u-haimanuta (tlata zibnia)	wash the legs three times
ana plan br planita ṣbina b-maṣbuta ḏ-bihram rba br rurbia maṣbutai tinaṭrai u-tisaq l-riš šuma ḏ-hiia u-šuma ḏ-manda ḏ-hiia madkar ˁlai (tlata zibnia)	dabble the fingers in the river, with the hands together and the palms downwards
ligrai ˁdaihun ḏ-šuba u-trisar la-tištalaṭ ˁlai šuma ḏ-hiia u-šuma ḏ-manda ḏ-hiia madkar ˁlai	dip the right foot twice and the left foot once into the river

== See also ==
- Brakha (daily prayer in Mandaeism)
- Rahma (Mandaeism)
- Shumhata
- Qulasta
- List of Qulasta prayers
- Rishama (ablution)
- Tamasha (ablution)
- Wudu

Signing

- Sign of the cross
- Kushta
- Mudra
