= Sidra d-Nishmata =

Mandaean liturgical prayerbook

Sidra ḏ-Nišmata

Information
- Religion: Mandaeism
- Language: Mandaic language
- Period: 3rd century AD or earlier

The Sidra ḏ-Nišmata (Classical Mandaic: ࡎࡉࡃࡓࡀ ࡖࡍࡉࡔࡌࡀࡕࡀ, lit. 'Book of Souls'; Modern Mandaic: Sedrā d-Nešmāthā), also known as the Book of Souls or Book of Gadana, is a collection of Mandaean litugical prayers that constitutes the first part of the Qulasta. It is typically considered to consist of 103 prayers. The Sidra ḏ-Nišmata most likely constitutes the oldest stratum of Mandaean literature and dates to at least the 3rd century CE or earlier.

The Sidra ḏ-Nišmata contains the most important prayers used in core Mandaean rituals, namely the masbuta and masiqta.

== Structure ==
Matthew Morgenstern (in the Comprehensive Aramaic Lexicon) and Majid Fandi Al-Mubaraki (2010) considers the Sidra ḏ-Nišmata to contain 103 prayers, which correspond to the first 103 prayers in both Mark Lidzbarski's Mandäische Liturgien (1920) and E. S. Drower's Canonical Prayerbook of the Mandaeans (1959).

The Sidra ḏ-Nišmata consists of the following sections. Each of the three parts has its own colophon.

- Part 1: Prayers 1–74
  - Prayers 1–31: masbuta liturgy
  - Prayers 32–72: masiqta liturgy
  - CP 73–74: the 2 "Letter" (engirta) prayers
- Part 2: Prayers 75–77: 3 long prayers of praise
- Part 3: Prayers 78–103: the "responses" (eniania)

== Types of prayers ==
Eric Segelberg (1958) lists the following types of prayers in the Sidra ḏ-Nišmata.

- buta (plural form: bauata; generic Mandaic term for prayers)
  - Prayers 1, 3, 5: prayers for the crown
  - Prayer 7: prayer for the pandama
  - Prayers 9–11: prayers at the river bank
  - Prayers 22–24: prayers over the oil
  - Prayers 25–28: buta haṭamta or "sealing prayer"
  - Prayer 32: opening masiqta prayer
  - Prayers 75–77: long baptismal prayers
- qaiamta: Prayers 56–65
- pugdama (lit. 'commandment, declaration'): Prayers 8, 14, 19, 34; also applies to Prayers 5, 47, 48
- šrita (plural form: širiata) (loosening or deconsecrating prayers): Prayers 2, 4, 6, 31, 55
- draša
  - Prayers 21, 30, 88–90
- eniana
  - Prayers 79–81: three hymns in the beginning of the baptismal rite
  - Prayer 82: hymn after the acts in the water
  - Prayer 83–87: hymns said after the sealing prayers

== List of prayers ==
Below is a list of individual prayers of the Sidra ḏ-Nišmata based on the text of Drower (1959), with additional notes from Segelberg (1958) and Buckley (2002).

Litanies in the Sidra d-Nishmata include prayers 8, 9, 25, 58, 70, 71, 77, 80, and 81.

=== Maṣbuta liturgy ===
- 3 sets of paired prayers for the burzinqa
  - Prayer 1 (audio): prayer containing a creation narrative
  - Prayer 2 (audio): šrita (loosening prayer) dedicated to Zihrun
  - Prayer 3 (audio): prayer to Yawar Ziwa bar Nhur Hiia, Hamgai Ziwa bar Hamgagai Ziwa, Zihrun
  - Prayer 4 (audio): šrita (loosening prayer) praising Manda d-Hayyi and the Light of Tarwan (taruan nhura)
  - Prayer 5 (audio): prayer to Yufin-Yufafin, Eit Enṣibat Eutria, Eit Yawar bar Enṣibat Eutria
  - Prayer 6 (audio): šrita (loosening prayer)
- Prayer 7 (audio): pandama prayer
- Prayer 8 (audio): longer incense (riha) prayer containing a litany
- "Adjutores baptismi" (adiauria ḏ-maṣbuta) prayers (audio of prayers 9–11)
  - Prayer 9 (audio): litany
  - Prayer 10 (audio): short prayer about the yardna
  - Prayer 11 (audio): short prayer to Yawar Ziwa and seven manas
- Prayer 12 (audio): prayer of Yur bar Barit opening up the yardna
- Prayer 13 (audio): descent to the yardna, attended by ʿuthria
- Prayer 14 (audio): margna prayer (pugdama or declaration of the margna)
- Exorcism prayers
  - Prayer 15 (audio): prayer for binding demons
  - Prayer 16 (audio): "perfected gem" prayer
  - Prayer 17 (audio): invocation of ʿuthria so that evil spirits would flee
- Prayer 18 (audio): long prayer blessing the yardna which begins with the invocation of Piriawis (main prayer said during the maṣbuta immersion)
- Prayer 19 (audio): short prayer for crowning with the klila, and pronouncing ʿuthria names over the baptized person ("Manda created/called me")
- Prayer 20 (audio): yardna prayer beginning with a blessing of the outer door (tira baraia), for deconsecrating the yardna
- Prayer 21 (audio): ascent from the yardna; the prayer rejects the sun, moon, and fire as witnesses
- Oil (miša) prayers
  - Prayer 22 (audio): invocation of ʿuthria before anointing with oil
  - Prayer 23 (audio): praising the oil
  - Prayer 24 (audio): oil driving off evil spirits and healing illnesses
- Sealing (haṭamta) prayers
  - Prayer 25 (audio): long litany
  - Prayer 26 (audio): short prayer sealing the baptized souls
  - Prayer 27 (audio): prayer invoking ʿUṣar-Hai and Pta-Hai, Manda ḏ-Hiia, and Hayyi
  - Prayer 28 (audio): prayer of healing and driving off illnesses
- Prayer 29 (audio): short prayer of rising up
- Prayer 30 (audio): prayer about conquering the mountain, fire, and sea (draša of the maṣbuta)
- Prayer 31 (audio): final šrita (loosening prayer)

=== Masiqta liturgy ===
- Prayer 32 (audio): short opening prayer
- Prayer 33 (audio): mambuha prayer dedicated to the Water of Life
- Prayer 34 (audio): shorter incense prayer
- Prayer 35 (audio): long prayer ("I sought to lift my eyes" (bit mišqal ainia)) dedicated to Manda d-Hayyi, used for versatile ritual applications
- Pihta prayers (Prayers 36–42 begin with "I worship, laud and praise" (sagidna šahabana u-mšabana).) (audio of prayers 36–43)
  - Prayer 36 (audio): prayer to the Mana, Drop (Niṭufta), Šar, Pirun
  - Prayer 37 (audio): prayer to the Cloud (Anana)
  - Prayer 38 (audio): prayer to Yawar Ziwa
  - Prayer 39 (audio): prayer of the šuta (declaration) of Yawar
  - Prayer 40 (audio): prayer to ʿUṣar
  - Prayer 41 (audio): prayer to ʿUṣar Nhur
  - Prayer 42 (audio): prayer of the šuta (declaration) of Yawar
  - Prayer 43 (audio): prayer to Manda ḏ-Hiia
- Mambuha prayers
  - Prayer 44 (audio): short prayer to Biriawiš
  - Prayer 45 (audio): longer prayer
- Masiqta prayers
  - Klila prayers
    - Prayer 46 (audio): klila prayer (nhur nhura). Almost identical to Prayer 5, except that the first two words of Prayer 46 are nhar nhura instead of nhur nhura in Prayer 5. As a result, Lidzbarski (1920) omits Prayer 46 as a duplicate of Prayer 5, although Drower (1959) and Gelbert & Lofts (2025) keep the prayer.
    - Prayer 47 (audio): klila prayer (zhira u-mzahra)
  - Prayer 48 (audio): oil prayer
  - Prayer 49 (audio): prayer for the spirit and soul; Ṣauriel is invoked
  - Prayer 50 (audio): prayer mentioning "Hamamulai"
  - Prayer 51 (audio): investiture prayer
  - Prayer 52 (audio): prayer invoking Yusmir
  - Prayer 53 (audio): masiqta sealing prayer (obtaining a letter from Abatur)
  - Prayer 54 (audio): prayer invoking Yukašar (entering the scales of Abatur)
  - Prayer 55 (audio): short pandama loosening prayer
  - Prayer 56 (audio): short living water prayer
  - Prayer 57 (audio): short incense prayer
  - Prayer 58 (audio): litany
  - Prayer 59 (audio): short pihta prayer
  - Prayer 60 (audio): short mambuha prayer
  - Prayer 61 (audio): klila prayer
  - Prayer 62 (audio): short prayer praising the Naṣoraeans
  - Prayer 63 (audio): oil prayer
  - Prayer 64 (audio): short prayer ("The Life dwells in its own radiance and light.")
  - Prayer 65 (audio): raising up of souls
  - Prayer 66 (audio): Left Ginza 3.43
  - Prayer 67 (audio): prayer of ascension
  - Prayer 68 (audio): Left Ginza 3.20
  - Prayer 69 (audio): "go in peace" (ˁzil b-šlam)
  - Prayer 70 (audio): litany
  - Prayer 71 (audio): prayer of Shum (Shem), son of Noah, which contains a litany
  - Prayer 72 (audio): prayer asking Manda ḏ-Hiia for the forgiveness of sins

=== Engirta prayers ===
- Prayer 73 (audio): long prayer about a sealed letter
- Prayer 74 (audio): short prayer about the seal and word of Kušṭa

=== Three long prayers ===
- Prayer 75 (audio): "Mandaic targum" bearing many similarities to Psalm 114
- Prayer 76 (audio): prayer of perfecting the souls
- Prayer 77 (audio): litany

=== Eniania ===
- Prayer 78 (audio): short prelude prayer
- Prayer 79 (audio): short myrtle prayer (placing the klila on the margna)
- "Hear me" (ʿunan ab ʿunian) litanies
  - Prayer 80 (audio): longer "hear me" litany
  - Prayer 81 (audio): shorter "hear me" litany
- Prayer 82 (audio): short mambuha prayer
- Maṣbuta prayers
  - Prayer 83 (audio): short prayer about plants planted and raised by the yardna
  - Prayer 84 (audio): short maṣbuta prayer about the baptizer
  - Prayer 85 (audio): short maṣbuta prayer about Shilmai, Nidbai, and Anush Uthra
  - Prayer 86 (audio): short maṣbuta prayer about the yardna
  - Prayer 87 (audio): short maṣbuta prayer about priests
  - Prayer 88 (audio): long prayer
  - Prayer 89 (audio): long prayer
  - Prayer 90 (audio): long prayer. See Gärtner (2013) for a study of the prayer comparing it with Jewish Christianity.
- Masiqta prayers
  - Prayer 91 (audio): short prayer about crossing the waters of death
  - Prayer 92 (audio): Left Ginza 3.4 (ˁzil b-šlam bhira dakia)
  - Prayer 93 (audio): short prayer about the Mana
  - Prayer 94 (audio): Left Ginza 3.3 (ṭubak ṭubak nišma)
  - Prayer 95 (audio): short prayer about Sunday, Kushta, and Zidqa (alms)
  - Prayer 96 (audio): Left Ginza 3.2 (zidana u-mzaudana)
  - Prayer 97: short prayer about being taken to the World of Light
  - Prayer 98: Left Ginza 3.7 (iuma ḏ-napiq nišma)
  - Prayer 99: prayer about the chosen ones
  - Prayer 100: short prayer about fragrant trees
  - Prayer 101: short prayer
  - Prayer 102: short prayer about the building of Life
  - Prayer 103: final masiqta prayer
