= Eniana =

Type of Mandaean prayer

In Mandaeism, a ʿniana or eniana (Classical Mandaic: ࡏࡍࡉࡀࡍࡀ, lit. 'response', Modern Mandaic pronunciation: [ʕeˈniɑna]; plural form: ʿniania ࡏࡍࡉࡀࡍࡉࡀ, Modern Mandaic pronunciation: [ʕeˈniɑni]) prayer is recited during rituals such as the masiqta and priest initiation ceremonies. They form part of the Qulasta. The rahma prayers are often considered to be a subset of the eniana prayers.

== Etymology ==
ʿNiana literally means "response," since the prayers may have originally been recited in a call and response manner.

== Manuscripts and translations ==
Jacques de Morgan's manuscript collection included a ʿniania manuscript dating back to 1833.

The prayers have been translated into English by E. S. Drower (1959). They have also been translated into German by Mark Lidzbarski (1920).

A printed, typesetted Mandaic version was published by Majid Fandi Al-Mubaraki in 1999.

== List of eniana prayers ==
=== Ktaba ḏ-Eniania ===
In Al-Mubaraki's Qulasta, the following prayers are included in Ktaba ḏ-Eniania ("Book of Responses").

- Ktaba ḏ-Eniania (Book of Responses) (Qulasta Volume 2, Part 1)
  - rušuma: 104
  - asut malkia: 105
  - rahmia: 106–118
  - rahmia ḏ-iumia (daily rahmia prayers): 119–164
    - iuma ḏ-habšaba (Sunday): 119–124
    - iuma ḏ-trin habšaba (Monday): 125–130
    - iuma ḏ-tlata habšaba (Tuesday): 131–136
    - iuma ḏ-arba habšaba (Wednesday): 137–142
    - iuma ḏ-hamša habšaba (Thursday): 143–148
    - iuma ḏ-rhaṭia (Friday): 149–154
    - iuma ḏ-šapta (Saturday): 155–162
    - iuma ḏ-habšaba (Sunday): 163–164
  - abatar bauata ḏ-iumia (after the daily prayers)
    - 165–169
    - zhara
    - 170–174
    - 2, 4, 6 (širiata / šrita prayers = loosing / deconscrating prayers)
    - 178
    - 410
    - 175–177

=== Masbuta and masiqta prayers ===
The following prayers are also considered to be ʿniana prayers according to Buckley (2010). They are numbered from 78–103 in both Drower's and Lidzbarski's versions of the Qulasta. These prayers are also known as eniania ḏ-maṣbuta and eniania ḏ-masiqta. Majid Fandi Al-Mubaraki includes them as part of the Sidra ḏ-Nišmata (Book of Souls).

- Prayer 78
- Prayer 79: prayer for the klila for the staff (margna)
- Prayer 80: longer "hear me" (ʿunan ab ʿunian) prayer invoking the Father, yardna and its two banks (trin kipḥ), Hibil Ziwa, Yawar Ziwa, Mana Rba Kabira, Habšaba (Sunday) and Kana ḏ-Zidqa, Abatur Rama, Bihram Rba, Yuzaṭaq Manda ḏ-Hiia, 7 Mysteries (šuba razia), 3 Springs (tlat ainaniata), 3 Manas (tlata mania), and Anush Uthra.
- Prayer 81: shorter "hear me" (ʿunan ab ʿunian) prayer invoking the Father, yardna and its two banks (trin kipḥ), Habšaba (Sunday) and Kana ḏ-Zidqa, and Hayyi Rabbi.
- Prayer 82: mambuha prayer

Masbuta prayers (eniania ḏ-maṣbuta):

- Prayer 83
- Prayer 84
- Prayer 85
- Prayer 86
- Prayer 87
- Prayer 88
- Prayer 89
- Prayer 90

Masiqta prayers (eniania ḏ-masiqta):

- Prayer 91
- Prayer 92
- Prayer 93
- Prayer 94
- Prayer 95
- Prayer 96
- Prayer 97
- Prayer 98
- Prayer 99
- Prayer 100
- Prayer 101

Communion prayer:

- Prayer 102

Concluding prayer:

- Prayer 103

Several of the eniana prayers are duplicated in Book 3 of the Left Ginza (GL 3):

Prayer	GL chapter
Prayer 92	3.4
Prayer 93	3.10
Prayer 94	3.3
Prayer 96	3.2
Prayer 98	3.7

There are also two eniana poems in Book 15 of the Right Ginza, which are chapters 15 and 16 of Book 15. These two poems contain the refrain "when the chosen/proven pure one went away" (kḏ azil bhira dakia ࡗ ࡀࡆࡉࡋ ࡁࡄࡉࡓࡀ ࡃࡀࡊࡉࡀ). This refrain is also found in prayers 205 and 233–256 of the Qulasta.

== See also ==
- Qulasta
- List of Qulasta prayers
- Call and response
- Sidra d-Nishmata
