= Secret handshake =

Distinct form of handshake or greeting which indicates membership

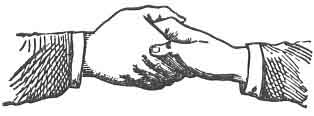
The Pass grip of a Fellow Craft, a Masonic recognition sign

A secret handshake is a distinct form of handshake or greeting which indicates membership in or loyalty to a club, clique or subculture. The typical secret handshake involves placing one's fingers or thumbs in a particular position, one that will be recognized by fellow members while seeming to be a normal handshake to non-members. This is most frequently associated in the popular consciousness with college fraternities, fraternal orders and secret societies.

== Examples ==
In the Roman mystery religion Mithraism, members were initiated with a handshake, and members were known as syndexioi (united by the handshake).

Freemasons are among the long-standing users of secret "grips" (similar to handshakes) as tokens.

Some (but not all) of the denominations from the Latter Day Saint movement also use secret grips as tokens, adopted and adapted from the concept of grips used as tokens in Freemasonry (similar to how other tokens have been adopted and adapted for Judeo-Christian ordinances, such as bread/wine, circumcision, immersion in water, etc.).

Secret handshakes are also used by college fraternities in the United States, and used by members as recognition symbols in later life.

== See also ==
- The Church of Jesus Christ of Latter-day Saints
- Collegiate secret societies in North America
- Freemasonry
- Gesture
- Kushta
- Latter Day Saint Movement
- Mormonism and Freemasonry
- Shibboleth
