= Tabahatan =

Mandaean prayer

The Ṭabahatan (Classical Mandaic: ࡈࡀࡁࡀࡄࡀࡕࡀࡍ, lit. 'Our Ancestors', Modern Mandaic pronunciation: [tˤabaˈhatan]), also known as the Abahatan Qadmaiia, is one of the most commonly recited prayers in Mandaeism, in which the reciter asks for the forgiveness of sins. As a commemoration prayer with a long list of names, the prayer starts with the line ṭab ṭaba l-ṭabia (Classical Mandaic: ࡈࡀࡁ ࡈࡀࡁࡀ ࡋࡈࡀࡁࡉࡀ, lit. 'Good is the Good for the Good'). A different version of this prayer is found in DC 42, Šarḥ ḏ-Ṭabahata ("The Scroll of Ṭabahata" [Parents]), which is used during Parwanaya rituals.

The Ṭabahatan prayer is numbered as Prayer 170 in E. S. Drower's version of the Qulasta, which was based on manuscript 53 of the Drower Collection (abbreviated DC 53). The Šal Šulta (Prayer 171) directly follows the Ṭabahatan prayer.

== Prayer ==
=== Drower (1959) version ===
Drower's (1959) version of the Tabahatan lists the following uthras and ancestors. Each name is followed by the phrase šabiq haṭaiia nihuilia ('forgiveness of sins be there for him' (singular); Modern Mandaic pronunciation: [ˈʃɑbaq haˈtˁɑji nɪhˈwile]) or šabiq haṭaiia nihuilun ('forgiveness of sins be there for them' (plural); Modern Mandaic pronunciation: [ˈʃɑbaq haˈtˁɑji nɪhˈwilχon]). Note that different versions of the Tabahatan may contain lists of names that vary significantly; for example, Salem Choheili recites a significantly different version.

"Our forefathers":
- Yušamin, son of Dmut-Hiia
- Abatur, son of Bihrat
- Habšaba and Kana-d-Zidqa
- the 24 ʿuthras, sons of light
- Ptahil, son of Zahriel
- Adam, son of Qin and Eve, his wife
- Šitil, son of Adam
- Ram and Rud
- Šurbai and Šarhabiel
- Sam, son of Noah, and Nuraita his wife
- Yahia-Yuhana, son of ʿNišbai, and Qinta, and Anhar, his wife
- those 360 priests who went forth from Jerusalem
- our good fathers
- me, Adam-Zihrun, son of Mahnuš

- my father, Yahia-Bihram, son of Hawa-Mamania
- my mother, Mahnuš, daughter of Simat
- my teacher, Bihram, son of Mudalal
- his wife, Anhar, daughter of Hawa
- my children, Anhar, daughter of Anhar
- my brothers (and sisters), Anhar, and Sam, and Mudalal, and Ram
- Muhatam-Yuhana, and Adam-Yuhana, the sons of Mahnuš

"Mandaeans":

- Ram, son of Šarat-Simat
- Zihrun, son of Simat
- Anhar, daughter of Simat
- Simat, daughter of Hawa
- Ram, son of Simat
- Yasmin, daughter of Yasman
- our good fathers
- me, Adam-Zihrun, son of Mahnuš

"Priests":

- my teacher, Bihram, son of Mudalal
- Adam-Zihrun, son of Mamania
- Yahia-Anuš, son of Maliha
- Yahia-Ram-Zihrun, son of Hawa-Simat
- Yahia-Zihrun, son of Mudalal
- Sam-Bihram, son of Mudalal
- our good forefathers
- me, Adam-Zihrun, son of Mahnuš

"Ganzibria":

- my teacher, Bihram, son of Mudalal
- Yahia-Yuhana, son of Hawa-Simat
- Zihrun, son of Simat
- Sam-Bihram, son of Simat
- Bihram-Šitil, son of Šarat
- Zihrun, son of Maliha
- Adam, son of Šadia-Maliha
- Yahia-Bayan and Yahia-Bihram, sons of Hawa-Mamania
- Ram-Yuhana, son of Mamania
- Bayan-Zangia, son of Anhar-Simat
- Sam-Saiwia, (Note: Written Sam-Ziwa, but pronounced Sam-Saiwia (Modern Mandaic pronunciation: [ˈsɑm seˈvi])) son of Šarat
- Bihram, son of Madinat
- Yahia, son of Anhar-Ziwa
- Ram-Sindan and Šaria
- Hawa, daughter of Daia
- Anhar-Kumraita, daughter of Simat
- Yahia-Ramuia, son of Ramuia
- Sam-Bihram, son of Mudalal
- Adam, son of Bihram (Bihrat?)-Dihgan
- Adam-Br-Hiia, son of Simat
- Brik-Yawar, son of Buran
- Bihram Bisḥaq, son of Hawa
- Šabur, son of Dukt
- Mhatam and Šitil, sons of Haiuna
- Anuš, son of Mihria-Zad
- Šaiar-Ziwa and Šabur, son (sons?) of Kaizarʿil (them?)
- Bhira, son of Kujasta
- Zakia, son of Hawa
- Ardaban-Malka-Baktiar, son of Simat
- our good fathers
- me, Adam-Zihrun, son of Mahnuš

"The ethnarchs (rishamas)":

- my teacher, Bihram, son of Mudalal
- Adam-Bul-Faraz, son of Hawa-Mamania
- Anuš Muʿailia, son of Hawa-Zadia
- Yahia-Adam, son of Zadia-Anuš, Hawa (?) (them?)
- Bihdad, son of Šadia
- Bainia, son of Haiuna
- Haiuna, daughter of Tihwia
- Ramuia, son of ʿQaimat
- Šganda, son of Yasman
- Zazai-d-Gawazta, son of Hawa

=== Salem Choheili version ===
The sections for the names of Mandaeans (mandaiia), priests (tarmidia), and ganzibria from Salem Choheili's version differ from those of Drower (1959). The remaining sections are nearly identical. Below is the Mandaic transliteration for the sections that differ from Drower's (1959) version.

Notes:

- br = 'son of'
- pt = 'daughter of'
- bnia = 'sons'
- u = 'and'

Mandaiia

- Adam Iuhana br Mudalal
- Mhatam Iuhana br Haua Simat
- Baian br Šarat
- Iahia br Mamania
- Adam Zihrun u Adam u Baian bnia Mahnuš
- Iahia Sam Haua Simat u Mhatam u Mahnuš bnia Mahnuš
- Zihrun br Iasman
- Mamania pt Maliha
- Iasman pt Anhar
- Adam Iuhana u Šarat Mamania u Sam Šaiar bnia Haua Simat
- Anhar pt Bibia Mudalal

Tarmidia

- Mhatam Iuhana br Bibia Mudalal
- Iahia Zihrun br Mudalal
- Sam Bihram br Mudalal
- Iahia Anuš br Maliha
- Iahia Ram Zihrun br Haua Simat
- Iahia Zihrun br Šarat Simat
- Bihram br Mudalal

Ganzibria

- Ram Zihrun br Maliha
- Iahia Iuhana br Haua Simat
- Bihram br Bibia u Mudalal
- Zakia Zihrun br Bibia Mudalal
- Iahia Iuhana br Haua Simat
- Adam br Šadia Maliha
- Iahia Baian u Iahia Bihram bnia Haua Mamania
- Ram Iuhana br Mamania
- Baian Zakia br Anhar Simat
- Sam Ziua br Šarat
- Iahia Baian u Iahia Bihram bnia Haua Mamania
- Ram Iahia br Mamania
- Bihram br Mdinat
- Iahia br Anhar Ziua Sindan u Šadia Šarat bnia Haua
- Anuš br Buran
- Haua pt Daia
- Anhar Kumraita pt Simat
- Iahia Ramuia br Ramuia
- Sam Bihram br Mudalal
- Adam Bihram br Dihgan
- Adam br Hiia br Simat Hiia
- Brik Iauar br Buran
- Bihram Bu Shaq br Haua
- Šabur br Dukt
- Mhatam u Šitlan bnia Hiuna
- Anuš br Mihrizar
- Šaiar Ziua u Šabur br Kaizarˁiil
- Hurmuzdukt br Haua Zadia
- Bhira br Kušasta
- Ardaban Malka Baktiar br Simat
- Zakia br Haua

== See also ==
- Scroll of the Ancestors
- Brakha (daily prayer in Mandaeism)
- Asut Malkia
- Shumhata
- Rahma (Mandaeism)
- Qulasta
- List of Qulasta prayers
- Litany of the Saints
- Intercession of saints
