= Rahma (Mandaeism) =

Daily devotional prayer in Mandaeism

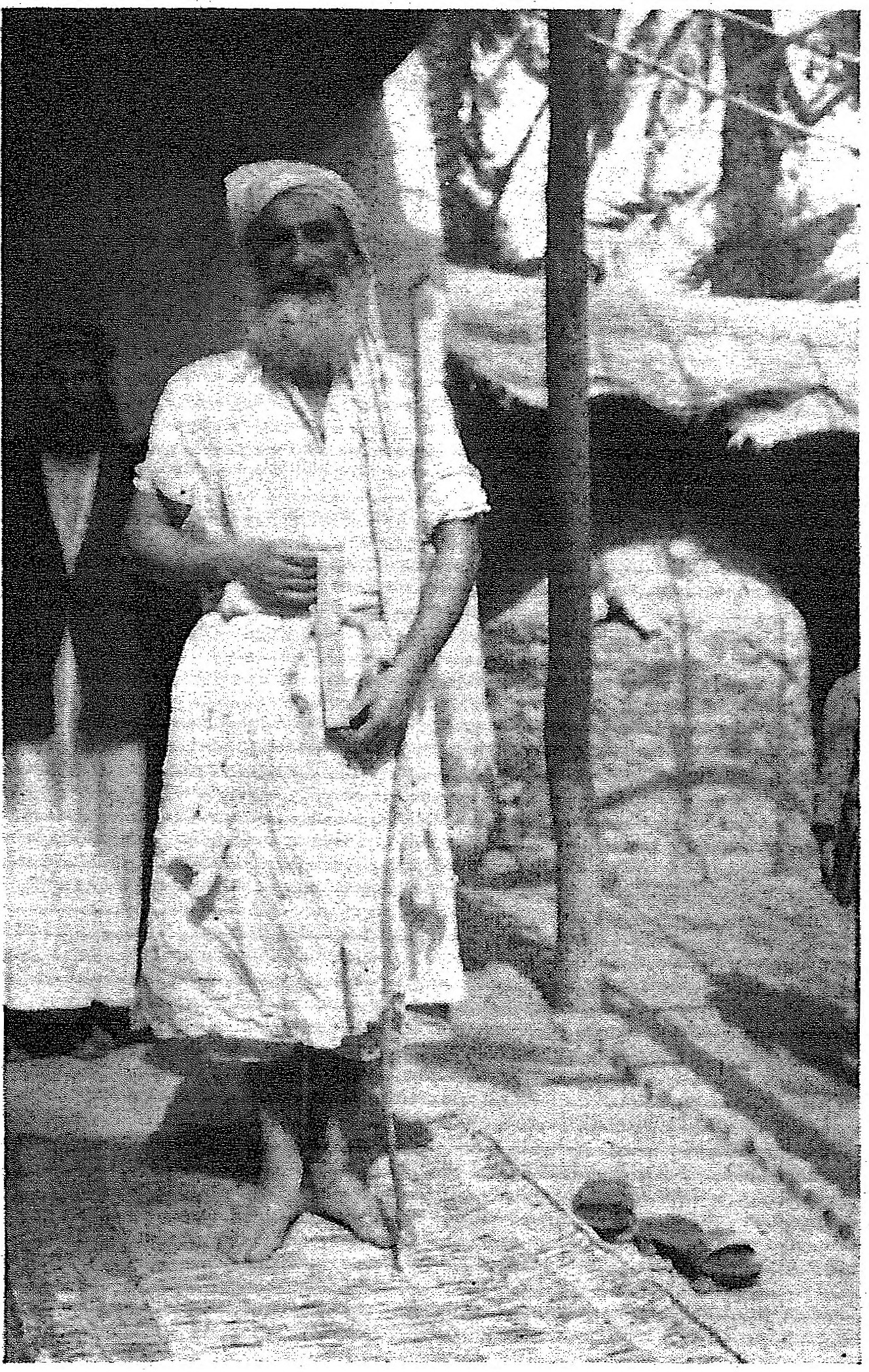
A Mandaean priest reciting the rahmia during the 1930s in southern Iraq

In Mandaeism, a rahma (Classical Mandaic: ࡓࡀࡄࡌࡀ; plural form: rahmia ࡓࡀࡄࡌࡉࡀ) is a daily devotional prayer that is recited during a specific time of the day or specific day of the week. There is a total of approximately 60 rahma prayers, which together make up the Eniania ḏ-Rahmia (modern Mandaic: Enyāni d-Rahmi), a section of the Qulasta that follows the Asut Malkia prayer.

== Translations ==
E. S. Drower's version of the Qulasta, the Canonical Prayerbook of the Mandaeans, has 64 rahma prayers translated into English that are numbered from 106 to 169. In Drower's ordering, the rahma prayers directly follow the Asut Malkia prayer (CP 105), while the Ṭabahatan prayer (CP 170) comes after the rahma prayers.

Part 1 of the Oxford Collection in Mark Lidzbarski's Mandäische Liturgien (1920) contains 60 rahma prayers translated into German that correspond to prayers 106–160 and 165–169 in Drower (1959).

In 1999, Majid Fandi Al-Mubaraki published a typesetted Mandaic edition of the Qulasta containing all of the rahma prayers.

== List of rahma prayers ==
Below, Oxford refers to Lidzbarski's (1920) numbering, while CP refers to Drower's (1959) number.

=== Hourly prayers ===
The first 13 prayers are recited during the three times of the day for prayer, which are dawn (sunrise), noontime (the "seventh hour"), and evening (sunset).

- Oxford 1.1 (CP 106) (audio): opening prayer ("stand up" and "praise")
- Oxford 1.2 (CP 107) (audio): dawn prayer ("Good Shganda of Light")
- Oxford 1.3 (CP 108) (audio): dawn prayer (short prayer praising Hayyi, Manda d-Hayyi, and the Great Countenance of Glory)
- Oxford 1.4 (CP 109): noontime (seventh hour) prayer (short prayer praising Hayyi, Manda d-Hayyi, and the Great Countenance of Glory)
- Oxford 1.5 (CP 110) ("the time has come")
- Oxford 1.6 (CP 111) ("Good Shganda of Light")
- Oxford 1.7 (CP 112): opening evening prayer (short prayer praising Hayyi, Manda d-Hayyi, and the Great Countenance of Glory)

CP 108, 109, and 112 (short prayer praising Hayyi, Manda d-Hayyi, and the Great Countenance of Glory) are duplicates. Another set of duplicate prayers ("Good Shganda of Light") consists of CP 107 and 111.

Rahma prayers recited after incense is offered:

- Oxford 1.8 (CP 113) (audio): dawn prayer, after incense (Manda d-Hayyi and Sunday)
- Oxford 1.9 (CP 114) (audio): dawn prayer, after incense (awaking from sleep to be surrounded by radiance)
- Oxford 1.10 (CP 115) (audio): dawn prayer, after incense (praising Manda d-Hayyi)
- Oxford 1.11 (CP 116) (audio): dawn prayer, after incense (uthras blessing Manda d-Hayyi)
- Oxford 1.12 (CP 117) (audio): noontime (seventh hour) prayer, after incense (praising Šrar the gupna, shkintas, and Ruaz the gupna)
- Oxford 1.13 (CP 118) (audio): evening prayer, after incense (praising Manda d-Hayyi)

=== Prayers for the days of the week ===
There are 6 rahma prayers for each day of the week. Each set consists of alternating long and short prayers (i.e., the 1st prayer is a long one, the 2nd prayer is a short one, while the 3rd prayer is again a long one, etc.).

Sunday prayers

- Oxford 1.14 (CP 119) (audio): Manda d-Hayyi and Ruha on Sunday
- Oxford 1.15 (CP 120) (audio): "What is my day amongst the days?")
- Oxford 1.16 (CP 121) (audio): the voice of the Living Water during the beginning of the universe
- Oxford 1.17 (CP 122): short prayer praising the Lord of prayers
- Oxford 1.18 (CP 123): "fruit is set up on the tree"
- Oxford 1.19 (CP 124): short prayer request to Hayyi

Monday prayers

- Oxford 1.20 (CP 125) (audio)
- Oxford 1.21 (CP 126) (audio)
- Oxford 1.22 (CP 127) (audio)
- Oxford 1.23 (CP 128)
- Oxford 1.24 (CP 129)
- Oxford 1.25 (CP 130)

Tuesday prayers

- Oxford 1.26 (CP 131)
- Oxford 1.27 (CP 132)
- Oxford 1.28 (CP 133)
- Oxford 1.29 (CP 134)
- Oxford 1.30 (CP 135)
- Oxford 1.31 (CP 136)

Wednesday prayers

- Oxford 1.32 (CP 137) (audio)
- Oxford 1.33 (CP 138) (audio)
- Oxford 1.34 (CP 139) (audio): climbing Mount Carmel
- Oxford 1.35 (CP 140): "between two mountains"
- Oxford 1.36 (CP 141)
- Oxford 1.37 (CP 142)

Thursday prayers

- Oxford 1.38 (CP 143) (audio)
- Oxford 1.39 (CP 144) (audio)
- Oxford 1.40 (CP 145) (audio)
- Oxford 1.41 (CP 146)
- Oxford 1.42 (CP 147)
- Oxford 1.43 (CP 148)

Friday prayers

- Oxford 1.44 (CP 149) (audio): Miriai meeting her mother
- Oxford 1.45 (CP 150) (audio)
- Oxford 1.46 (CP 151) (audio)
- Oxford 1.47 (CP 152)
- Oxford 1.48 (CP 153)
- Oxford 1.49 (CP 154)

Saturday prayers

- Oxford 1.50 (CP 155) (audio)
- Oxford 1.51 (CP 156) (audio)
- Oxford 1.52 (CP 157) (audio)
- Oxford 1.53 (CP 158)
- Oxford 1.54 (CP 159)
- Oxford 1.55 (CP 160)

=== Saturday evening priest initiation prayers ===
The 2 prayers for novices in priest initiation ceremonies, recited on Saturday evening (sunset):

- CP 161 (not in Lidzbarski)
- CP 162 (not in Lidzbarski): Miriai answering the evil ones on a Sabbath evening

=== Sunday dawn priest initiation prayers ===
The 2 prayers for novices in priest initiation ceremonies, recited on Sunday dawn (sunrise):

- CP 163 (not in Lidzbarski)
- CP 164 (not in Lidzbarski)

=== "Fruits of Ether" prayers ===
The last 5 prayers are the prayers for the "Fruit(s) of Ether".

- Oxford 1.56 (CP 165) (audio)
- Oxford 1.57 (CP 166) (audio)
- Oxford 1.58 (CP 167) (audio)
- Oxford 1.59 (CP 168) (litany)
- Oxford 1.60 (CP 169) (litany)

== See also ==
- Brakha (daily prayer in Mandaeism)
- Asut Malkia
- Tabahatan
- Shumhata
- Qulasta
- List of Qulasta prayers
- Sidra d-Nishmata
