= Kushta =

Mandaic religious concept of truth

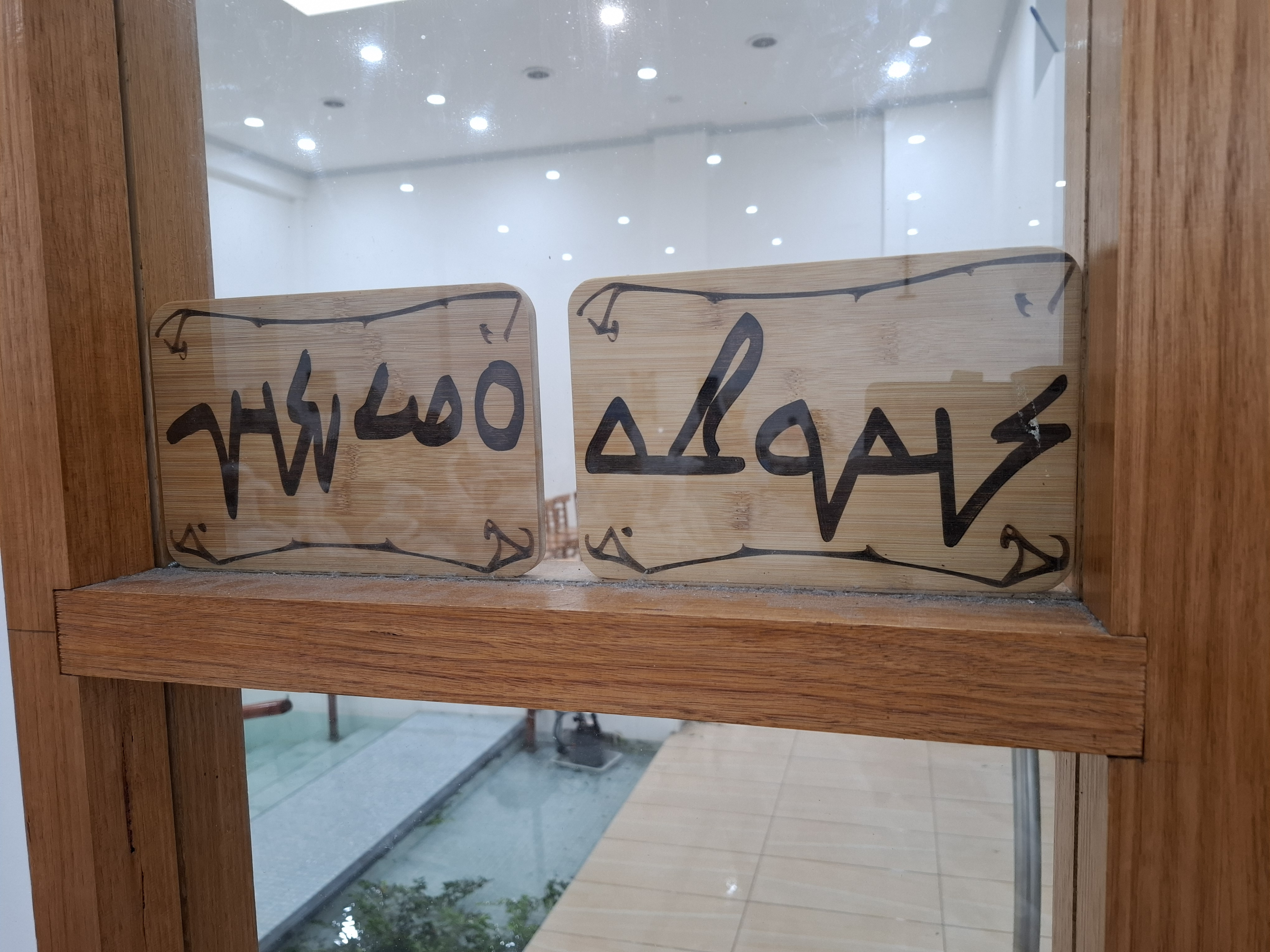
A Mandaic sign that reads kušṭa asinkun (ࡊࡅࡔࡈࡀ ࡀࡎࡉࡍࡊࡅࡍ, "May truth strengthen/heal you") at Yahya Yuhana Mandi

In Mandaeism, kushta or kušṭa (Classical Mandaic: ࡊࡅࡔࡈࡀ, lit. 'truth', Modern Mandaic pronunciation: [ˈkuʃtˤɑ]) can have several meanings. Its original literal meaning is "truth" in the Mandaic language, and is thus typically used to refer to the Mandaean religious concept of truth. The same word is also used to refer to a sacred handclasp between the right hands of two people that is used during Mandaean rituals such as the masbuta, masiqta, and priestly initiation ceremonies.

== In the World of Light ==
Mandaeans believe that in the World of Light, the Mšunia Kušṭa, or the world of ideal counterparts, exists, where everything has a corresponding spiritual pair (dmuta). Alternatively, kušṭa can be used as a synonym for Hayyi Rabbi, or God in Mandaeism.

In the 69th chapter of the Mandaean Book of John, Manda d-Hayyi addresses Etinṣib Ziwa (Splendid Transplant), son of Yushamin, as "Truth, beloved by all excellencies." E. S. Drower interprets a reference in the Haran Gawaita to being looked upon by and rising with Transplant upon death as a reference to Ṣauriel, the Angel of Death. Book 1, chapter 1 of the Left Ginza likewise observes that Ṣauriel is called "Death" in this world, but "Truth" (Kushta) by those who know about him.

Carl H. Kraeling interprets the concept of Kushta as having developed from an entity in the pleroma representing truth as the directive force of Hayyi's actions, alongside Manda d-Hayyi as his hypostatic reason.

== In rituals ==
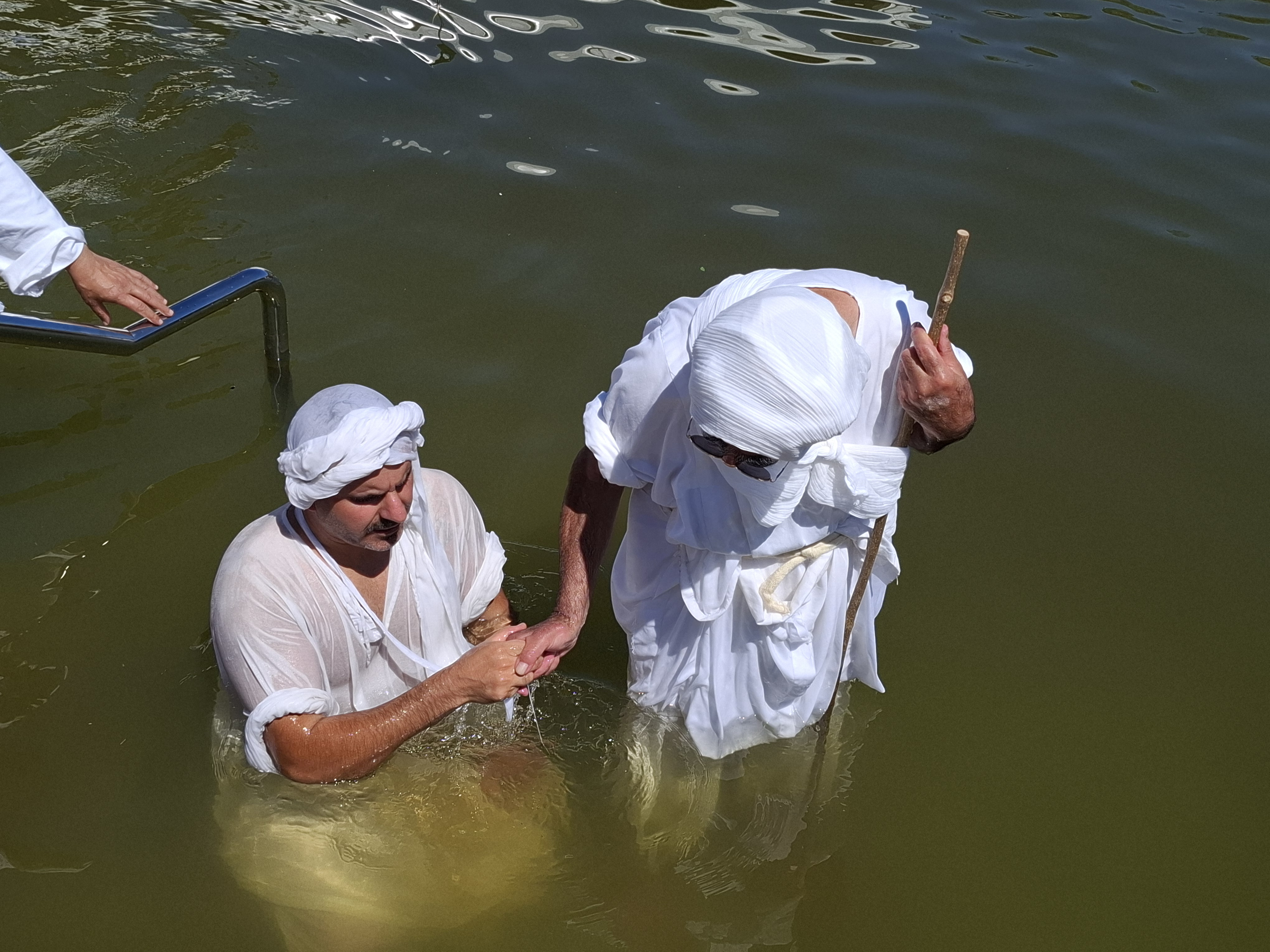
Rishamma Salah Choheili performing the kušṭa (ritual handclasp) with a Mandaean during a masbuta ritual at Wallacia Mandi during Parwanaya 2025

The kušṭa handclasp is exchanged dozens of times between the novice and initiator during priest initiation ceremonies. It is also exchanged during rituals that need to be performed by priests, such as masbuta and masiqta rituals.

A common formula used in at the beginnings of Mandaean prayers and during rituals is kušṭa asinkun (Classical Mandaic: ࡊࡅࡔࡈࡀ ࡀࡎࡉࡍࡊࡅࡍ, lit. 'May truth strengthen you (plural)', Modern Mandaic pronunciation: [ˈkuʃtˤɑ aˈsɪnəχon]), which can also be translated as 'May truth heal you' or 'May truth make you whole'. The word asinkun is derived from the root a-s-a, which can mean 'to strengthen' or 'to heal'. The singular form, also commonly used, is kušṭa asiak (Classical Mandaic: ࡊࡅࡔࡈࡀ ࡀࡎࡉࡀࡊ, lit. 'May truth heal you (singular', Modern Mandaic pronunciation: [ˈkuʃtˤɑ ˈasiak]). During rituals (masbuta, etc.), priests also often say kušṭa asiak qaimak (Classical Mandaic: ࡊࡅࡔࡈࡀ ࡀࡎࡉࡀࡊ ࡒࡀࡉࡌࡀࡊ, lit. 'May truth heal and strengthen you (singular)', Modern Mandaic pronunciation: [ˈkuʃtˤɑ ˈasiak ˈqaimak]) as a blessing for the Mandaeans being baptized.

== Prayers ==
Prayer 178 of the Qulasta contains 10 repetitions of kušṭa asiak (singular) / kušṭa asinkun (plural). The Mandaic text is from Al-Mubaraki (2010), and the English translation below is based on that of Gelbert and Lofts (2025).

Mandaic transliteration

kušṭa asiak tagai
kušṭa asiak rbai
kušṭa asiak burzinqai
kušṭa asiak naṭra ḏ-burzinqai
kušṭa asiak ziua rba qadmaia
kušṭa asiak nhura rba qadmaia
kušṭa asinkun ahai tarmidia
kušṭa asinkun hiia abahatai
kušṭa asiak ganzai (Note: The Mandaic ganza is a variant of ginza.)
kušṭa asiak naṭra ḏ-ginzai

English translation

Kušṭa strengthen thee, my crown.
Kušṭa strengthen thee, my teacher.
Kušṭa strengthen thee, my turban.
Kušṭa strengthen thee, guardian of my turban.
Kušṭa strengthen thee, great first radiance.
Kušṭa strengthen thee, great first light.
Kušṭa strengthen you, my brother-priests.
Kušṭa strengthen you, Life and my parents.
Kušṭa strengthen thee, my treasure.
Kušṭa strengthen thee, guardian of my treasure.

== Parallels in other religions ==
Samaritans commonly refer to the Samaritan Pentateuch as ࠒࠅࠔࠈࠄ (Qušṭā, 'Truth'), which is cognate with the Mandaic word Kušṭa. Samaritans believe that God authored their Pentateuch and gave Moses the first copy, along with the two tablets containing the Ten Commandments.

== Bibliography ==
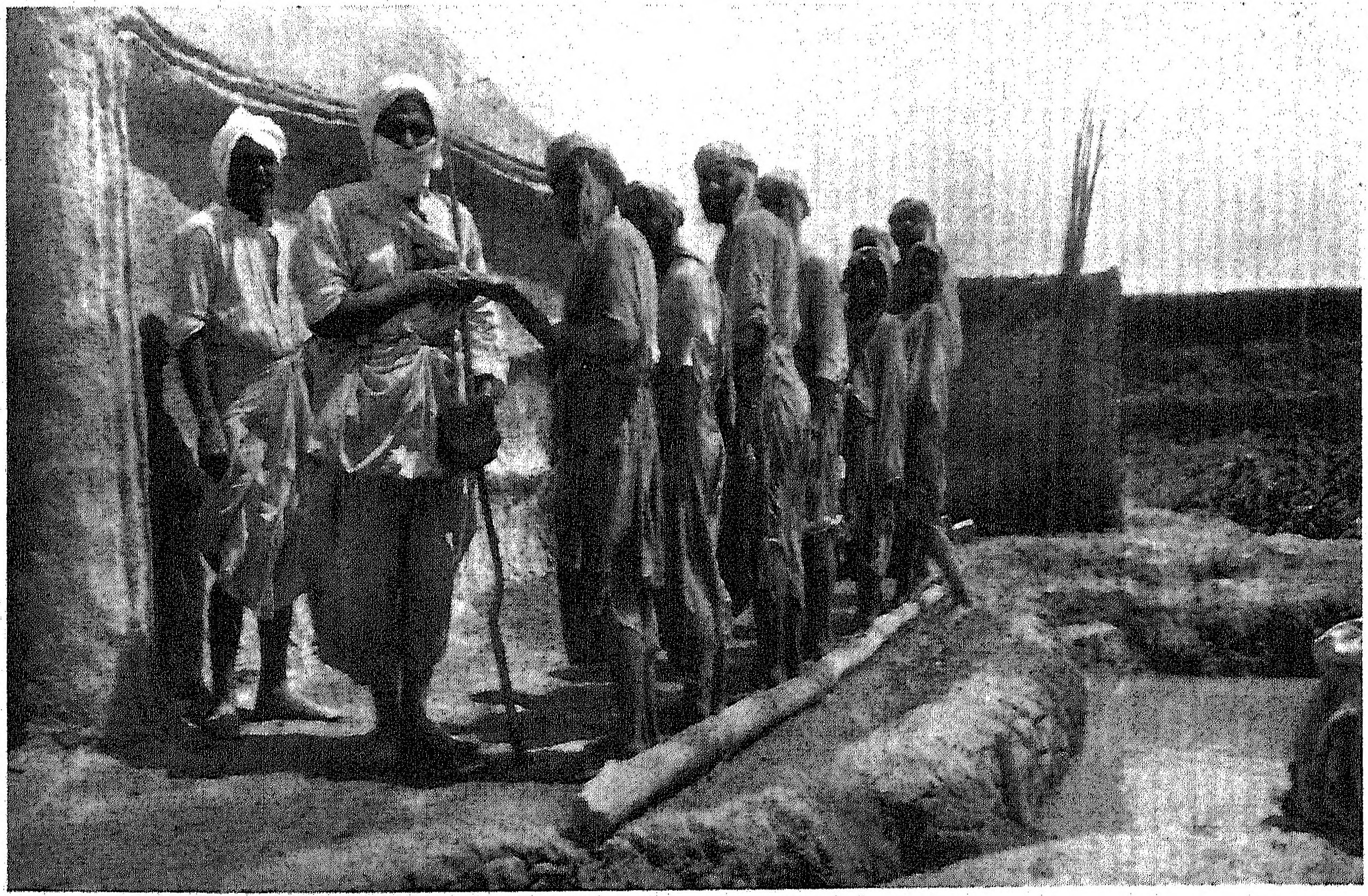
Kushta (handclasp) between a Mandaean priest and another Mandaean during the 1930s in southern Iraq

A two-volume study, titled Kushṭā: a monograph on a principal word in Mandaean texts and written by Waldemar Sundberg (1953, 1994), has been published by Lund University Press.

- Sundberg, Waldemar (1953). Kushṭā, a monograph on a principal word in Mandaean texts. Volume I: The Descending Knowledge. Lund: Lund University Press.
- Sundberg, Waldemar (1994). Kushṭā, a monograph on a principal word in Mandaean texts. Volume II: The Ascending Soul. Lund: Lund University Press. ISBN 9179662927.

== See also ==
- Drabsha, the symbol of Mandaeism
- Rushuma
- Secret handshake
- Via et veritas et vita
- Religious views on truth
