= Ezlat =

Prototypical feminine figure in Mandaeism

ʿZlat
- Other names: ʿZlat Rabtia
- Abode: World of Light
- Consort: Shishlam

In Mandaeism, ʿZlat (Classical Mandaic: ࡏࡆࡋࡀࡕ, lit. 'she wove/she span'), also Ezlat, Īzlat, or ʿZlat Rabtia ('ʿZlat the Great', Modern Mandaic pronunciation: [ʕezˈlɑt ˈrɑbti]), is the wife or female consort of Shishlam, a figure representing the prototypical priest or prototypical Mandaean. Hence, Zlat symbolizes the prototypical Mandaean priestly wife as the archetype of the pure bride. She is described in the Mandaean priestly text The Thousand and Twelve Questions as the "Wellspring of Light."

Zlat is also mentioned in Qulasta prayers 17, 105, 106, 171 (the Šal Šulta), and 173 (the Šumhata).

== See also ==
- Simat Hayyi
