= Brakha =

Prayer in Mandaeism

Daily prayer in Mandaeism, called brakha ࡁࡓࡀࡊࡀ in Mandaic (cognate with Hebrew berakhah and Arabic barakah) or occasionally birukta (birukhta), consists of set prayers that are recited three times per day. Mandaeans stand facing north while reciting daily prayers. Unlike in Islam and Eastern Christianity, prostration is not practiced.

Mandaean priests recite rahma prayers three times every day, while laypeople also recite the Rushuma (signing prayer) and Asut Malkia ("Healing of Kings") daily. When priests lead laypeople during prayers, laypeople repeat each word or phrase of a prayer after the priest, similar to certain parts of Roman Catholic masses.

In Mandaic, the generic term for an individual prayer is buta ࡁࡅࡕࡀ (plural form: bawata ࡁࡀࡅࡀࡕࡀ).

== Prayer times ==
The three prayer times in Mandaeism are:

- dawn (sunrise) (corresponding to the Fajr prayer in Islam and Shacharit in Judaism; mentioned in Book 8 of the Right Ginza as rahmia ḏ-miṣṭipra = ࡓࡀࡄࡌࡉࡀ ࡖࡌࡉࡎࡈࡉࡐࡓࡀ)
- noontime (the "seventh hour") (corresponding to the Zuhr prayer in Islam and Mincha in Judaism; mentioned in Book 8 of the Right Ginza as rahmia ḏ-šuba šaiia = ࡓࡀࡄࡌࡉࡀ ࡖࡔࡅࡁࡀ ࡔࡀࡉࡉࡀ)
- evening (sunset) (corresponding to the Maghrib prayer in Islam and Maariv in Judaism; mentioned in Book 8 of the Right Ginza as rahmia ḏ-l-paina = ࡓࡀࡄࡌࡉࡀ ࡖࡋࡐࡀࡉࡍࡀ)

Traditionally, the prayers are performed while wearing the rasta (robe), burzinqa (turban), and himiana (belt).

== Opening rahma prayer ==
Before each of the daily prayers, the following opening rahma (daily devotional prayer; recorded multiple times as prayers 108 (morning prayer), 109 (noontime prayer), and 112 (evening prayer) in E. S. Drower's 1959 Canonical Prayerbook of the Mandaeans) is recited.

Mandaic transliteration
(Lidzbarski 1920)

b-šuma ḏ-hiia
l-hiia sagidna
u-l-marai manda ḏ-hiia mšabana
u-l-hak parṣupa rba ḏ-ʿqara
ḏ-mn napšiḥ praš

English translation
(Gelbert & Lofts 2025)

In the name of the [Great] Life.
I venerate the Life,
and I praise my lord Manda ḏ-Hiia,
and that great Countenance of glory,
who emanated from Himself.

== See also ==
- Barakah
- Berakhah
- Beracah
- Qulasta
- List of Qulasta prayers
- Salah
- Jewish prayer
- Bshuma
