= Majid Fandi Al-Mubaraki =

Iraqi-Australian writer and researcher

- ماجد فندي المباركي
- Born: Iraq
- Citizenship: Australian
- Occupations: Writer and researcher
- Children: Brian Mubaraki
- Writing career
- Language: Mandaic, Arabic, English
- Genres: Non-fiction; religion
- Subject: Mandaeism
- Notable works: Ginza Rabba, Qulasta

Majid Fandi Al-Mubaraki (Arabic: ماجد فندي المباركي) is an Iraqi-Australian writer and researcher based in the Sydney metropolitan area. He is known for his publications of Mandaic texts, including the Ginza Rba and Qulasta.

== Biography ==
Al-Mubaraki is a Mandaean who was born in Iraq. He was trained as an engineer. Al-Mubaraki emigrated to Australia before the 2003 invasion of Iraq. In the late 1990s and early 2000s, he lived in Northbridge, but later moved to Luddenham.

The full Ginza Rba in printed Mandaic script, compiled primarily from the Mhatam Zihrun br rbai Adam manuscript from Iraq (copied in 1898 and dated 6 July 1899), was first published by Majid Fandi Al-Mubaraki, Brikha Nasoraia (as Rbai Haitham Saeed), and Brian Mubaraki in Sydney in March 1998 during Parwanaya. A Latin transliteration of the entire Ginza Rba was also published in 1998 by Majid Fandi Al-Mubaraki and Brian Mubaraki. The Concordance of the Mandaean Ginza Rba was published by Brian Mubaraki and Majid Fandi Al-Mubaraki in 2004.

In 1999, Majid Fandi Al-Mubaraki, Brikha Nasoraia, and Brian Mubaraki (also known as Brayan Majid Al-Mubaraki) published a two-volume set of the Qulasta prayers printed in Mandaic script.

== Mandaic texts ==
Below is a list of Mandaic texts edited and transcribed by Majid Fandi Al-Mubaraki along with his son Brian Mubaraki.

Qulasta

- Al-Mubaraki, Majid Fandi; Mubaraki, Brian (2010). Qulasta – Sidra d Nishmata / Mandaean Liturgical Prayer Book (Book of Souls). Vol. 1. Luddenham, New South Wales: Mandaean Research Centre. ISBN 9781876888145. (1998 edition: ISBN 978-0-9585705-1-0)
- Al-Mubaraki, Majid Fandi; Mubaraki, Brian (2010). Qulasta – 'niania & Qabina / Mandaean Liturgical Prayer Book (Responses & Marriage). Vol. 2. Luddenham, New South Wales: Mandaean Research Centre. ISBN 9781876888152.
- Al-Mubaraki, Majid Fandi; Mubaraki, Brian (2010). Qulasta – 'niania / The Mandaean Prayer Book – Responses. Luddenham, New South Wales: Mandaean Research Centre. ISBN 9781876888121.

Ginza Rba

- Al-Mubaraki, Majid Fandi; Mubaraki, Brian (2010). Ginza Rba (The Great Treasure). Luddenham, New South Wales: Mandaean Research Centre. ISBN 9781876888138. (1998 edition: ISBN 0-646-35222-9; 1999 transliteration: ISBN 0-9585705-2-3)

Mandaean Diwans: Sacred Scrolls series

- Al-Mubaraki, Majid Fandi; Mubaraki, Brian (2010). Diwan Nahrauatha. Mandaean Diwans: Sacred Scrolls. Vol. 1. Luddenham, New South Wales: Mandaean Research Centre. ISBN 9781876888169. (2002 edition: ISBN 1876888016)
- Al-Mubaraki, Majid Fandi; Mubaraki, Brian (2010). Haran Gauaitha. Mandaean Diwans: Sacred Scrolls. Vol. 2. Luddenham, New South Wales: Mandaean Research Centre. ISBN 9781876888176. (2002 edition: ISBN 1876888024)
- Al-Mubaraki, Majid Fandi; Mubaraki, Brian (2010). Diwan Malkutha 'laitha. Mandaean Diwans: Sacred Scrolls. Vol. 3. Luddenham, New South Wales: Mandaean Research Centre. ISBN 9781876888183. (2002 edition: ISBN 1876888032)
- Al-Mubaraki, Majid Fandi; Mubaraki, Brian (2010). Diwan Masbuta d Hibil Ziwa. Mandaean Diwans: Sacred Scrolls. Vol. 4. Luddenham, New South Wales: Mandaean Research Centre. ISBN 9781876888190. (2002 edition: ISBN 1876888040)
- Al-Mubaraki, Majid Fandi; Mubaraki, Brian (2010). Diwan Alma Rishaia Zuta. Mandaean Diwans: Sacred Scrolls. Vol. 5. Luddenham, New South Wales: Mandaean Research Centre. ISBN 9781876888206. (2002 edition: ISBN 1876888059)
- Al-Mubaraki, Majid Fandi; Mubaraki, Brian (2010). Diwan Dmuth Kushta. Mandaean Diwans: Sacred Scrolls. Vol. 6. Luddenham, New South Wales: Mandaean Research Centre. ISBN 9781876888213. (2002 edition: ISBN 1876888067)

== Books (Arabic and English) ==
Below is a list of Arabic and English books authored by Al-Mubaraki.

- Al-Mubaraki, Majid Fandi (2000). The Mandaean Rasta: its making and wearing. ISBN 0958570566.

Mandaic language education materials

- Al-Mubaraki, Majid Fandi (2001). A Mandaean language teaching book: a beginners book for the learning-teaching of the Mandaic language. ISBN 0958570590.
- Al-Mubaraki, Majid Fandi (2006). A Mandaic dictionary: Mandaic-English. ISBN 1876888105.

Arabic books

- Al-Mubaraki, Majid Fandi (2000). Studies in Mandaeanism: History and Beliefs / Deerasat Mandaeah: Tareekh w-Mugtaadat (in Arabic). Northbridge, New South Wales. ISBN 0-9585705-5-8.
- Al-Mubaraki, Majid Fandi (2000). Rijal al-din al-mandayin 1800-2000: tarsimuhum arauhum wa-mawaqifuhum (in Arabic). ISBN 0958570582.
- Al-Mubaraki, Majid Fandi (2018). Al-mandayin: seralbaqa ... wal-haiat menasera / The Mandaeans: secret of survival and life is victorious (in Arabic). ISBN 9781876888121.
- Al-Mubaraki, Majid Fandi (2020). Rijal al-din al-mandayin 1800-2000: tarsimuhum arauhum wa-mauqifuhum / The Mandaean priests 1800-2000 (in Arabic). ISBN 9781876888237.
- Al-Mubaraki, Majid Fandi (2020). Rijal al-din al-mandayin fee al-Qarn al-Hadi w al-Eshreen / The Mandaean priests in twenty first century (in Arabic). ISBN 9781876888245.
- Al-Mubaraki, Majid Fandi (2023). al-Nabatat w-al-tqoos al-Mandaiia: al-Maana w- al- esteemal / The plants and the Mandaeans rites: the meaning and use (in Arabic). ISBN 9781876888251.
