= Manda d-Hayyi =

Savior figure in Mandaeism

- Other names: Gnosis of Life
- Abode: World of Light
- Weapons: Radiance and Light; a great attire; margna (staff) of Living Water; wreath of the Living Flame; arm or of the Great Ones; mace/club; veil/net; a robe of the Great Ones
- Offspring: Hibil Ziwa

Equivalents
- Jewish: Raziel (?)

In Mandaeism, Manda d-Hayyi or Manda ḏ-Hiia (Classical Mandaic: ࡌࡀࡍࡃࡀ ࡖࡄࡉࡉࡀ, lit. 'the 'Gnosis of Life', 'Knowledge of Life', or 'Knower of the Life'', Modern Mandaic pronunciation: [ˈmendɑtˁ ˈhejji] (mandā-ṭ-heyyī) is an uthra (angel or guardian) sent by the Great Life (Hayyi Rabbi, or the Transcendent God) as a messenger to John the Baptist. Manda d-Hayyi is considered to be the most important uthra, since he is the one bringing manda (knowledge or gnosis) to Earth (Tibil).

== In Mandaean texts ==
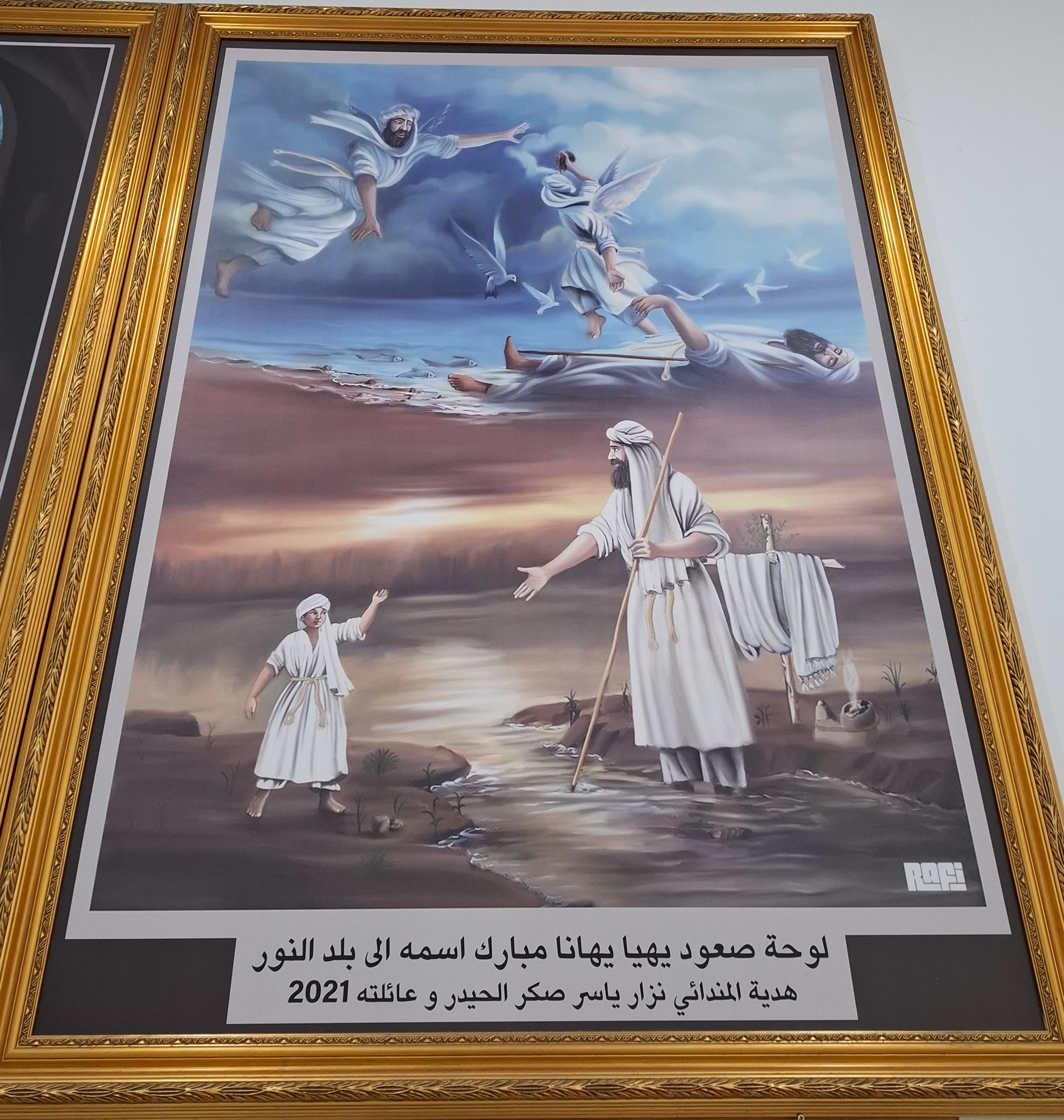
A painting at Yahya Yuhana Mandi depicting the ascension of Yahya Yuhana (John the Baptist) to the World of Light during his meeting with Manda d-Hayyi, who appears as a boy. The story is from Right Ginza Book 5, Chapter 4.

In Book 5, Chapter 4 of the Right Ginza, Manda d-Hayyi appears to John the Baptist as a "small boy aged three years and one day." John the Baptist baptizes the small boy, after which John is taken up to the World of Light (see also the Coptic Apocalypse of Paul, in which a little boy appears to Paul the Apostle, who is then taken up to heaven). Also, in Book 8 of the Right Ginza, Manda d-Hayyi warns the faithful against the dangers of Ruha.

In the Mandaean Book of John and Book 3 of the Right Ginza, Manda d-Hayyi makes a journey into the World of Darkness (underworld), where he meets Gaf and other demons and triumphs against them.

Manda d-Hayyi is sometimes portrayed as harbouring a grudge against Yushamin. In the eighth chapter of the Book of John, Manda d-Hayyi opposes a petition to the King of Light for forgiveness for Yushamin brought by Yushamin's son Nṣab Ziwa (Classical Mandaic: ࡍࡑࡀࡁ ࡆࡉࡅࡀ, lit. 'Splendid Plant'), and is rebuked by the King of Light for hating Yushamin due to Yushamin having refused him a wife from his family.

In some Mandaean texts, he is also referred to as Yuzaṭaq Manda d-Hayyi (Classical Mandaic: ࡉࡅࡆࡀࡈࡀࡒ ࡌࡀࡍࡃࡀ ࡖࡄࡉࡉࡀ}, romanized: Yuzaṭaq Manda ḏ-Hiia, Modern Mandaic pronunciation: [juˈzɑtˤɑq ˈmendɑt ˈhejji]). E. S. Drower (1960) suggests that "male Holy Spirit" is a probable meaning for Yuzaṭaq. Mark J. Lofts (2010) proposes a connection with Yessedekeus in Sethianism.

== Relationship to Hibil ==
E. S. Drower notes in an appendix to her translation of the Scroll of Abatur that Manda d-Hayyi and Hibil are sometimes identified with one another, although they are considered separate figures in the Diwan Abatur. Manda d-Hayyi is sometimes named as Hibil's father; elsewhere, Hayyi Rabbi is mentioned as Hibil's father.

The ritual passages in The Baptism of Hibil Ziwa describe Hibil as Manda d-Hayyi's son and include Manda d-Hayyi amongst those officiating in Hibil's baptism. However, the same scroll's account of Hibil's descent to the World of Darkness refers to "Hibil-Ziwa" when he is being commanded to descend, switches to referring to "Manda" or "Manda-ḏ-Hiia" while he is in the World of Darkness, and back to referring to "Hibil-Ziwa" when he is seeking to be able to ascend back to the World of Light; furthermore, Manda d-Hayyi is then summoned within the World of Light to send a letter of Kushta to his son Hibil to aid the latter's ascent. Drower notes "read "Hibil" for "Manda"" in a footnote in her translation, and inserts "(Hibil-Ziwa son of)" as a differentiated inline annotation where appropriate.

== Weapons ==
According to the Right Ginza, the weapons of Manda d-Hayyi are:

1. Radiance and Light (Ziwa u Nhūra)
2. a great attire
3. the margna (staff) of Living Water (Mia Hiia)
4. the wreath of the Living Flame (ʿŠata Haita)
5. the armor of the Great Ones
6. a mace (club)
7. a veil (or a net?)
8. a robe of the Great Ones

== Syriac parallels ==
The Syriac phrase maddəᶜā dəḥayye (Classical Syriac: ܡܰܕ݁ܥܳܐ ܕ݁ܚܰܝܶܐ, lit. 'knowledge of life') is attested in the Peshitta text of Luke 1:77, a passage from the Song of Zechariah. In the passage, Zechariah praises his son John the Baptist, saying that his son will "give knowledge of life to his [the Lord's] people." It is the only place where this phrase is mentioned in the Peshitta New Testament. However, in most other Bible versions and translations, the phrase "knowledge of salvation" (Koine Greek: γνῶσιν σωτηρίας, romanized: gnōsin sōtērias) is used instead of "knowledge of life."

Below is an excerpt of Luke 1:76–77 from the Lamsa Bible.

And you, boy, will be called the prophet of the Highest; (watt ṭalyā nəḇīēh dəᶜelāyā teṯqəre)
for you will go before the face of the Lord, to prepare his way; (tīzal gēr qəḏām parṣūppēh dəmāryā daṯṭayyeḇ ᵓūrḥēh)
To give knowledge of life to his people (dənettel maddəᶜā dəḥayye ləᶜammēh)
by the forgiveness of their sins (bəšūḇqānā daḥṭāhayhon)

== Kabbalah parallels ==
Manda d-Hayyi can also be compared to the angel Raziel in the Jewish tradition. Raziel is mentioned in Kabbalistic texts such as Sefer Raziel HaMalakh. Both are described as intermediaries who convey divine knowledge to humans, especially Adam. In Jewish mysticism, Raziel delivers the "Sefer Raziel" to Adam, containing esoteric secrets about the universe and divine mysteries, while in Mandaeism, Manda d-Hayyi instructs Adam about the mysteries of life and creation.

In Mandaeism, after the creation of the material world, Adam Kasia (Adam Kadmon in the Mandaean tradition) asks Abatur (Ancient of Days or Metatron/Hanokh in the Mandaean tradition. The Merkabah text Re'uyot Yehezkel identifies the Ancient of Days as Metatron) what he will do when he goes to Tibil (Earth or Malkuth). Abatur responds that Adam will be helped by Manda d-Hayyi, who instructs humans with sacred knowledge and protects them.

== See also ==
- Gnosticism § Jesus as Gnostic saviour
- Manda (Mandaeism)
- Divine spark
- Manda (goddess)
- List of angels in theology
- Raziel
- Adam and Eve
- Mandaeism
- Sefer Raziel
- Kabbalah
