= Asut Malkia =

Common prayer in Mandaeism

The Asut Malkia (Classical Mandaic: ࡀࡎࡅࡕ ࡌࡀࡋࡊࡉࡀ, lit. 'Salutation of Kings', Modern Mandaic pronunciation: [aˈsut ˈmelki]) or Asuta ḏ-Malkia (Classical Mandaic: ࡀࡎࡅࡕࡀ ࡖࡌࡀࡋࡊࡉࡀ) is one of the most commonly recited prayers in Mandaeism. In the prayer, the reciter wishes health and victory (asuta u-zakuta ࡀࡎࡅࡕࡀ ࡅࡆࡀࡊࡅࡕࡀ) upon dozens of heavenly and ancestral figures. According to E. S. Drower, it is recited daily by priests and also before all baptisms (masbuta), ritual meals (lofani), and various rites.

The Asut Malkia is numbered as Prayer 105 in E. S. Drower's version of the Qulasta, which was based on manuscript 53 of the Drower Collection (abbreviated DC 53).

== Etymology ==
Asut or asuta can be literally translated as 'healing' and can also mean 'salutation' or 'greeting', while malkia means 'kings' (singular form: malka).

Similarly, Mandaeans typically greet other individual Mandaeans with the phrase:

Asuta nihuilak (Classical Mandaic: ࡀࡎࡅࡕࡀ ࡍࡉࡄࡅࡉࡋࡀࡊ, lit. 'healing be upon you (sg.)', Modern Mandaic pronunciation: [aˈsuta nɪhˈwilak])

Multiple people are greeted using the plural form:

Asuta nihuilkun (Classical Mandaic: ࡀࡎࡅࡕࡀ ࡍࡉࡄࡅࡉࡋࡊࡅࡍ, lit. 'healing be upon you (pl.)', Modern Mandaic pronunciation: [aˈsuta nɪhˈwilχon])

== Prayer ==
The formula asuta u-zakuta nihuilkun (Classical Mandaic: ࡀࡎࡅࡕࡀ ࡅࡆࡀࡊࡅࡕࡀ ࡍࡉࡄࡅࡉࡋࡊࡅࡍ, lit. 'health and victory are yours', Modern Mandaic pronunciation: [aˈsutau zaˈkuta nɪhˈwilχon]) is recited dozens of times in the prayer before the names of each uthra or set of uthras, Hayyi Rabbi, some of the prophets, and the reciter himself, almost all of whom are addressed as malka (ࡌࡀࡋࡊࡀ "king"; Modern Mandaic pronunciation: [ˈmelka]).

=== Drower (1937) ===
Drower's (1937) version lists the following uthras, etc.

1. Treasure of the Great First Sublime Life (ginza d-hiia rbia qadmaiia yaqira)
2. Lord of Lofty Greatness (mara d-rabuta ʿilaita)
3. Yushamin the Pure, son of Niṣabtun
4. Manda d-Hiia, son of Niṣabtun
5. Hibil Ziwa
6. Anush Uthra
7. Shishlam Rabba
8. ʿS'haq, the first great Radiancy (ʿS'haq Ziwa rba qadmaiia)
9. Sam Ziwa, the Pure, eldest, first, beloved (Sam Ziwa dakia bukra habiba rba qadmaiia)
10. Hibil and Shitil and Anush
11. Adatan and Yadatan
12. Shilmai and Nidbai, guardian ʿutri of the flowing water (ʿutria naṭria d-yardna; i.e., the guardian uthras of the yardna of Piriawis)
13. 24 ʿutri, sons of the light
14. 4 beings, sons of perfection
15. Anṣab and consort (lit. cloud) of Anṣab
16. Sar and Sarwan
17. Zhir and Zihrun, and Bhir and Bhrun [sic] (or Bihrun), and Tar and Tarwan
18. ʿUrfiʿil and Marfiʿil and Yawar Tugmur
19. Shingilan ʿUtra
20. Bar-Bag ʿUtra
21. Shingilan ʿUtra
22. Simat Hiia
23. ʿIzlat the Great
24. Sharat Niṭufta
25. Kanat Niṭufta
26. Bihrat Anana
27. Abatur Rama
28. ʿUṣṭuna Rabba
29. Abatur Muzania
30. Bar-Zahrʿil (i.e., Ptahil)
31. Yahya Yuhana (i.e., John the Baptist)
32. Adam, First Man (Adam gabra qadmaiia)
33. Shitil, son of Adam
34. malki (kings) and ʿutri and indwellers, and flowing waters and outgushings and all the dwellings of the World of Light

The final part is translated in Drower (1937: 45) as:

Mandaic transliteration

asuta u-zakuta nihuilkun
ia malkia ʿutria u-maškinia
u-iardinia u-rhaṭia
u-škinata ḏ-alma ḏ-nhura kulaihun

English translation

Health and victory (purity) are yours,
O melkas and ʿuthras and dwellers,
and flowing waters and streams
and all the dwellings of the world of light.

The word niṭufta (spelled niṭupta) originally means 'drop' and has sometimes also been translated as 'cloud'. It is also often used as an appellation to refer to the consorts of uthras.

=== Drower (1959) ===
Drower's (1959) version, which differs from the version in Drower (1937), lists the following uthras, etc.

1. great Gate of the precious House of Mercies
2. honoured First Parents
3. Treasure of the great First honoured Life
4. Mara d-Rabutha ʿlaita
5. Yušamin the Pure, son of Niṣibtun
6. Manda d-Hiia, son of Niṣibtun
7. Hibil Ziwa
8. Anuš ʿuthra
9. Šišlam Rba
10. ʿS'haq Ziwa Rba Qadmaia
11. Sam Ziwa, pure, eldest, beloved, great, first Radiance
12. Hibil, Šitil, and Anuš
13. Adatan and Yadatan
14. Šilmay and Nidvay, two guardian ʿuthras of the jordan
15. 24 ʿuthras, sons of light
16. 4 beings, sons of Salutation
17. Nṣab and Anan Nṣab
18. Sar and Sarwan
19. Zhir and Zahrun and Bhir and Bihrun
20. Tar and Tarwan
21. Yufin-Yufafin
22. Habšaba (Sunday) and Kana d-Zidqa
23. Barbag ʿuthra
24. Šingilan ʿuthra
25. Simat Hiia
26. Great ʿZlat
27. Šarat Niṭufta
28. Kanat Niṭufta
29. Bihrat Anana
30. Abathur Rama
31. ʿUṣṭuna Rba
32. Abathur Muzania
33. Pthahil, son of Zahriel
34. Yahia Yuhana
35. Adam, the first man
36. Šitil, son of Adam the first man
37. kings and ʿuthras
38. indwellings and jordans
39. running streams and škintas of the world(s) of light

=== Al-Mubaraki (2010) ===
Below is a list of names and entities mentioned in the Asut Malkia, from Majid Fandi Al-Mubaraki's Qulasta (volume 2), as edited by Matthew Morgenstern and Ohad Abudraham in the Comprehensive Aramaic Lexicon. Some names are addressed with the title Malka ("King"), while others are not. It is longer than Drower's version and is currently the most commonly used version recited by contemporary Mandaeans.

1. Great Gate of the House of Honored Mercies (Baba Rba ḏ-Bit Rahmia Yaqira)
2. honored first ancestors (Abahatan Qadmaiia Yaqiria)
3. Treasure (Ginza) of Hayyi Rabbi, the Honored First One (Qadmaiia Yaqira)
4. Malka Exalted Lord of Greatness (Mara ḏ-Rabuta ˁlaita)
5. Malka Pure Yušamin, son of Niṣibtun (Yušamin Dakia bar Niṣibtun)
6. Malka Manda ḏ-Hiia, son of Niṣibtun
7. Malka Hibil Ziwa
8. Malka Anuš Uthra
9. Malka Šišlam Rba
10. Malka Shaq Ziwa Rba Qadmaia ("First Great Radiant Shaq")
11. Malka Sam Ziwa, pure, eldest, beloved, great, first (Dakia Bukra Habiba Rba Qadmaia)
12. Hibil and Šitil and Anuš
13. Adatan and Yadatan
14. Šilmai and Nidbai, guardian uthras of the Yardna
15. 24 uthras, sons of light (srin u-arba ˁutria bnia nhura)
16. 4 beings, sons of peace/greeting (arba gubria bnia šlama)
17. Nṣab and Anan Nṣab
18. Sar and Sarwan
19. Zhir and Zihrun; Bhir and Bihrun; Tar and Tarwan
20. Arfeil and Marfeil
21. Yufin and Yufafin
22. Sunday and alms (Habšaba and Kana ḏ-Zidqa)
23. Bihrun and Kanpeil
24. Malka Steadfast Drabshas (drabšia taqna)
25. Malka Šihlbun Uthra
26. Malka Barbag Uthra
27. Malka Šingalan Uthra
28. Malka Righteous Great Unique One (Lihdaia Rba Zadiqa)
29. Malka ˁtinṣib Ziwa
30. Malka Adakas Mana ("Secret Adam, the Mana")
31. Malka Adakas Malala ("Secret Adam, the Word")
32. Malka Pure Ether (Ayar Dakia)
33. Malka Abundant Ether (Ayar Sagia)
34. Malka Mahzian the Word (Mahzian Malala)
35. Malka Yawar Kbar
36. Malka Yawar Rba
37. Malka Yukabar Rba
38. Malka Yukašar Kana
39. Malka Nbaṭ Ziwa Rba Qadmaia ("First Great Radiant Nbaṭ")
40. Malka Sam Mana Smira
41. Malka Great Father of Glory (Aba Rba ḏ-ˁqara)
42. Malka Great Countenance of Glory (Parṣupa Rba ḏ-ˁqara)
43. Malka Adam Shaq Ziwa
44. Malka Bihram Rba
45. Malka Yuzaṭaq Manda ḏ-Hiia
46. Malka Yawar Ganzeil Uthra
47. Malka Zihrun Raza Kasia
48. Malka Samandareil Uthra
49. Malka Ṣanaṣeil Uthra
50. Malka Taureil Uthra
51. Malka Gubran Uthra
52. Simat Hiia
53. ˁzlat Rabtia
54. Šarat Niṭufta
55. Kanat Niṭufta
56. Bihrat Anana
57. Pure Pearl (Marganita Dakita)
58. Malka Abatur Rama
59. Malka ˁṣṭuna Rba ("Great Body")
60. Malka Abatur Muzania
61. Malka Ptahil, son of Zahreil
62. Malka Yahya Yuhana
63. Malka Adam the First Man (Adam Gabra Qadmaia)
64. Malka Šitil, son of Adam the First Man
65. Malka kings and uthras; mašknas and yardnas; running streams (rhaṭia) and škintas of the World(s) of Light

==== Mandaic text ====
Below is the full transliterated Mandaic text of the above. The recurring formula asuta u-zakuta 'healing and victory' is repeated 66 times.

kušṭa asinkun

bšumaihun ḏ-hiia rbia
asuta u-zakuta nihuilak
ia baba rba ḏ-bit rahmia iaqira
asuta u-zakuta nihuilkun
abahatan qadmaiia iaqiria
asuta u-zakuta nihuilik
ginza ḏ-hiia rbia qadmaiia iaqira
asuta u-zakuta nihuilak
malka mara ḏ-rabuta ˁlaita
asuta u-zakuta nihuilak
malka iušamin dakia br niṣibtun
asuta u-zakuta nihuilak
malka manda ḏ-hiia br niṣibtun
asuta u-zakuta nihuilak
malka hibil ziua
asuta u-zakuta nihuilak
malka anuš ˁutra
asuta u-zakuta nihuilak
malka šišlam rba
asuta u-zakuta nihuilak
malka shaq ziua rba qadmaia
asuta u-zakuta nihuilak
malka sam ziua dakia bukra habiba rba qadmaia
asuta u-zakuta nihuilkun
hibil u-šitil u-anuš
asuta u-zakuta nihuilkun
adatan u-iadatan
asuta u-zakuta nihuilkun
šilmai u-nidbai ˁutria naṭria ḏ-iardna
asuta u-zakuta nihuilkun
srin u-arba ˁutria bnia nhura
asuta u-zakuta nihuilkun
arba gubria bnia šlama
asuta u-zakuta nihuilkun
nṣab u-anan nṣab
asuta u-zakuta nihuilkun
sar u-saruan
asuta u-zakuta nihuilkun
zhir u-zihrun
bhir u-bihrun
u-tar u-taruan
asuta u-zakuta nihuilkun
arpˁiil u-marpˁiil
asuta u-zakuta nihuilkun
iupin u-iupapin
asuta u-zakuta nihuilkun
habšaba u-kana ḏ-zidqa
asuta u-zakuta nihuilkun
bihrun u-kanpˁiil
asuta u-zakuta nihuilak
malka drabšia taqna
asuta u-zakuta nihuilak
malka šihlbun ˁutra
asuta u-zakuta nihuilak
malka barbag ˁutra
asuta u-zakuta nihuilak
malka šingalan ˁutra
asuta u-zakuta nihuilak
malka lihdaia rba zadiqa
asuta u-zakuta nihuilak
malka ˁtinṣib ziua
asuta u-zakuta nihuilak
malka adakas mana
asuta u-zakuta nihuilak
malka adakas malala
asuta u-zakuta nihuilak
malka aiar dakia
asuta u-zakuta nihuilak
malka aiar sagia
asuta u-zakuta nihuilak
malka mahzian malala
asuta u-zakuta nihuilak
malka iauar kbar
asuta u-zakuta nihuilak
malka iauar rba
asuta u-zakuta nihuilak
malka iukabar rba
asuta u-zakuta nihuilak
malka iukašar kana
asuta u-zakuta nihuilak
malka nbaṭ ziua rba qadmaia
asuta u-zakuta nihuilak
malka sam mana smira
asuta u-zakuta nihuilak
malka aba rba ḏ-ˁqara
asuta u-zakuta nihuilak
malka parṣupa rba ḏ-ˁqara
asuta u-zakuta nihuilak
malka adam shaq ziua
asuta u-zakuta nihuilak
malka bihram rba
asuta u-zakuta nihuilak
malka iuzaṭaq manda ḏ-hiia
asuta u-zakuta nihuilak
malka iauar ganzˁil ˁutra
asuta u-zakuta nihuilak
malka zihrun raza kasia
asuta u-zakuta nihuilak
malka samandarˁil ˁutra
asuta u-zakuta nihuilak
malka ṣanaṣˁiil ˁutra
asuta u-zakuta nihuilak
malka taurˁiil ˁutra
asuta u-zakuta nihuilak
malka gubran ˁutra
asuta u-zakuta nihuilik
simat hiia
asuta u-zakuta nihuilik
ˁzlat rabtia
asuta u-zakuta nihuilik
šarat niṭupta
asuta u-zakuta nihuilik
kanat niṭupta
asuta u-zakuta nihuilik
bihrat anana
asuta u-zakuta nihuilik
marganita dakita
asuta u-zakuta nihuilak
malka abatur rama
asuta u-zakuta nihuilak
malka ˁṣṭuna rba
asuta u-zakuta nihuilak
malka abatur muzania
asuta u-zakuta nihuilak
malka ptahil br zahrˁiil
asuta u-zakuta nihuilak
malka iahia iuhana
asuta u-zakuta nihuilak
malka adam gabra qadmaia
asuta u-zakuta nihuilak
malka šitil br adam gabra qadmaia
asuta u-zakuta nihuilkun
ia malkia
u-ˁutria
u-mašknia
u-iardnia
u-rhaṭia
u-škinata ḏ-almia ḏ-nhura kulaikun
asuta u-zakuta u-šabiq haṭaiia nihuilia
l-haza nišimtai l-dilia
plan br planita ḏ-haza buta u-rahmia bit šabiq haṭaiia nihuilia

=== Salem Choheili (2026) ===
Salem Choheili (c. 2026) recites a version that is most similar to Al-Mubaraki's (2010) version, although there some differences in the order and inclusion of uthra names, as well as a few Mandaic spelling differences. Choheili's version includes Hilbun Uthra, an uthra who is not included in any of the other versions given above.

1. Great Gate of the House of Honored Mercies (Baba Rba ḏ-Bit Rahmia Yaqira)
2. honored first ancestors (Abahatan Qadmaiia Yaqiria)
3. Treasure (Ginza) of Hayyi Rabbi, the Honored First One (Qadmaiia Yaqira)
4. Malka Exalted Lord of Greatness (Mara ḏ-Rabuta ˁlaita)
5. Malka Pure Yušamin, son of Niṣibtun (Yušamin Dakia bar Niṣibtun)
6. Malka Manda ḏ-Hiia, son of Niṣibtun
7. Malka Hibil Ziwa
8. Malka Anuš Uthra
9. Malka Šišlam Rba
10. Malka Shaq Ziwa Rba Qadmaia ("First Great Radiant Shaq")
11. Malka Sam Ziwa, pure, eldest, beloved, great, first (Dakia Bukra Habiba Rba Qadmaia)
12. Hibil and Šitil and Anuš
13. Adatan and Yadatan
14. Šilmai and Nidbai, guardian uthras of the Yardna
15. 24 uthras, sons of light (srin u-arba ˁutria bnia nhura)
16. 4 beings, sons of peace/greeting (arba gubria bnia šlama)
17. Nṣab and Anan Nṣab
18. Sar and Sarwan
19. Zhir and Zihrun; Bhir and Bihrun; Tar and Tarwan
20. Yufin and Yufafin
21. Arfeil and Marfeil
22. Sunday and alms (Habšaba and Kana ḏ-Zidqa)
23. Malka Šihlbun Uthra
24. Bihrun and Kanpeil
25. Malka Steadfast Drabshas (drabšia taqnia)
26. Malka Hilbun Uthra
27. Malka Barbag Uthra
28. Malka Šingalan Uthra
29. Malka Righteous Great Unique One (Lihdaia Rba Zadiqa)
30. Malka ˁtinṣib Ziwa
31. Malka Adakas Mana ("Secret Adam, the Mana")
32. Malka Pure Ether (Ayar Dakia)
33. Malka Abundant Ether (Ayar Sagia)
34. Malka Mahzian the Word (Mahzian Malala)
35. Malka Yawar Kbar
36. Malka Yawar Rba
37. Malka Yukabar Rba
38. Malka Yukašar Kana
39. Malka Nbaṭ Ziwa Rba Qadmaia ("First Great Radiant Nbaṭ")
40. Malka Sam Mana Smira (sam mana u-smira)
41. Malka Great Father of Glory (Aba Rba ḏ-ˁqara)
42. Malka Great Countenance of Glory (Parṣupa Rba ḏ-ˁqara)
43. Malka Adam Shaq Ziwa
44. Malka Bihram Rba
45. Malka Yuzaṭaq Manda ḏ-Hiia
46. Malka Yawar Ganzeil Uthra
47. Malka Zihrun Raza Kasia
48. Malka Samandareil Uthra
49. Malka Ṣanaṣeil Uthra
50. Malka Taureil Uthra
51. Malka Gubran Uthra
52. Simat Hiia
53. ˁzlat Rabtia
54. Šarat Niṭufta
55. Bihrat Anana
56. Kanat Niṭufta
57. Pure Pearl (Marganita Dakita)
58. Malka Abatur Rama
59. Malka ˁṣṭuna Rba ("Great Body")
60. Malka Abatur Muzania
61. Malka Ptahil, son of Zahreil
62. Malka Yahya Yuhana
63. Malka Adam the First Man (Adam Gabra Qadmaia)
64. Malka Šitil, son of Adam the First Man
65. Malka kings and uthras; mašknas and yardnas; running streams (rhaṭia) and škintas of the World(s) of Light

== See also ==
- Brakha (daily prayer in Mandaeism)
- Tabahatan
- Shal Shulta
- Shumhata
- Rahma (Mandaeism)
- Qulasta
- List of Qulasta prayers
- Litany of the Saints
- Intercession of saints
