= Secrets of the Ancestors =

Religious text of Mandaeism

The Scroll and Tafsir of the Secrets of the Ancestors Diwan u-tafsir ḏ-razia ḏ-abahata

Information
- Religion: Mandaeism
- Language: Mandaic language

Diwan u-tafsir ḏ-razia ḏ-abahata (Classical Mandaic: ࡃࡉࡅࡀࡍ ࡅࡕࡀࡐࡎࡉࡓ ࡖࡓࡀࡆࡉࡀ ࡖࡀࡁࡀࡄࡀࡕࡀ "Scroll and Tafsir [Explanation] of the Secrets of the Ancestors", or simply "The Secrets of the Ancestors") is a Mandaean religious text. It is written as a scroll.

== Manuscripts and translations ==
The Bodleian Library at Oxford University holds a manuscript of the text, catalogued as Ms. Asiat. Misc. C 13. The text was translated into German by Bogdan Burtea in 2012.

Bodleian MS Asiat. Misc. C 13 was copied at Mučarra in 1238 A.H. (1822-3 A.D.) by Iahia Ram Zihrun br Mhatam. The text lists the names Barmeil, Bihdad, Bihram, Šišlam, Šišlameil, Manhareil, Nureil, Zihrun, Sahqeil, Haiil, and Reil. Bogdan Burtea's (2012) German translation is based on MS Asiat. Misc. C 13.

MS Asiat. Misc. C 13 was discovered in 1956. It is a scroll that is about 32 cm wide and 257 cm long. The text contains 378 lines and occupies about 28.5 cm in width. Illustrations take up 31.5 cm of the length. The illustrated part of the manuscript is marked by frames and is divided into two parts. The upper part with banner illustrations is about 12 cm, and the lower one with anthropomorphic figures is about 18.5 cm high. The illustrations are accompanied by short explanations written in Mandaic. The figures depicted are about 7 cm in length. The manuscript is dated to the year 1238 A.H. (1822 A.D.).

As of 2022, Brikha Nasoraia is working on a translation and analysis of the scroll.

== Contents ==
The contents of the text are:

- Lines 1–5: Introduction
- between lines 5 and 6: illustrations with accompanying written explanations
- Lines 6–157: Secret teachings/instructions of the uthri (light beings)
- Lines 158–362: Interpretation of prayers and rituals
- Lines 363–378: Colophon

The text lists the names of the following uthras in order:

- Barmeil
- Bihdad
- Bihram
- Šišlam
- Šišlameil
- Manhareil
- Nureil
- Zihrun
- Sahqeil
- Haiil
- Reil

The manuscript also contains illustrations of the following uthras.

- Bihram (illustrated twice)
- Bihrun-Yusmir
- Hibil
- Hibil Rba
- Natreil
- Shilmai (illustrated twice) and Nidbai
- Sam
- Shitil Rba
- Yupin
- Yushamin
- Zihrun
- Kanat (female)
