= Drabsha =

Symbol of Mandaeism

Mandaean drabsha, symbol of the Mandaean faith

The drabsha (Classical Mandaic: ࡃࡓࡀࡁࡔࡀ, romanized: drabša; Modern Mandaic: drafšā) or darfash (Persian: درفش) is the symbol of the Mandaean faith, consisting of a cross of olive wood half covered with a piece of white cloth. It is typically translated as "banner".

== Etymology ==
The Mandaic term drabša is derived from the Middle Persian word drafš, which means 'banner or standard; a flash of light; sunrise'. In Mandaic, drabša can also mean 'a ray or beam of light'.

An uncommon variant spelling is drapša, which may have been the original spelling.

== Description and symbolism ==
The drabša is a banner in the shape of a cross made of two branches of olive wood fastened together and half covered with a piece of white cloth traditionally made of pure silk, and seven branches of myrtle. The drabša white silk banner is not identified with the Christian cross. Instead, the four arms of the drabsha symbolize the four corners of the universe, while the pure silk cloth represents the Light of God (Hayyi Rabbi). The seven branches of myrtle represent the seven days of creation. The drabsha is viewed as a symbol of light and the light of the sun, moon and stars is envisaged to shine from it. It may be of pre-Christian origin and used originally to hang a prayer shawl during immersion in the river (masbuta).

== In Mandaean manuscripts ==
Mandaean manuscripts often contain descriptions and illustrations of named drabšia. The most common names for drabšia are Shishlameil, Shishlam, and Bihram. The following drabšia names are mentioned in various Mandaean manuscripts:

- Scroll of the Rivers (DC 7): Šišlamʿil, Bihram, Nahriel
- Diwan Abatur (DC 8): Nbaṭ, Šamišiel
- Zihrun Raza Kasia (DC 27): Šišlamʿil, Bihram
- Scroll of Exalted Kingship (DC 34): Šišlamʿil
- Baptism of Hibil Ziwa (DC 35): Bihram, Šišlam, Mašriel
- Alma Rišaia Zuṭa (DC 48): Azahʿil, Azazʿil, Kliliaiil, Nhurʿil, Nurʿil, Ramʿil, Šišlamʿil
- Secrets of the Ancestors (MS Asiat. Misc. C. 13): Barmʿil (twice), Bihram, Bihdad, Manharʿil (four times), Nurʿil, Rʿil, Sahqʿil, Šišlam, Šišlamʿil (twice)

=== Qulasta ===
In E. S. Drower's version of the Qulasta, prayers 330–347 (corresponding to Part 4 of Mark Lidzbarski's Oxford Collection) are dedicated to the drabša. In many of these prayers, which mention the unfurling of drabshas, individual drabshas have given names.

- Šišlamiel (various prayers)
- Šašlamiel (prayer 347)
- Manhariel (prayer 334)
- Pirun (prayer 333) (also the name of a gufna)
- Zihrun (prayers 332, 340, 341, 374)

==== Drabsha prayer ====
During Parwanaya, the buta drabša (Qulasta prayers CP 337–339 = Oxford Collection 4.8–11) is recited by Mandaean laypeople, who repeat the prayer after a priest as they put klilas onto the drabsha. Below is a transliteration of the version recited by Najah Choheili and Salem Choheili, both of whom reside in Ahvaz, Iran. The English translation below is partially based on Gelbert & Lofts (2025) and has been revised.

The prayer describes the drabsha as a ray of light (since in Mandaic, drabša can also mean 'ray of light') originating from the World of Light. It is passed to Hibil Ziwa and then to Adam Kasia, and finally to the chosen Nasoraeans. The drabsha, now manifested as a physical banner, is set up so that the water of the yardna and the radiance (ziwa) of the banner, representing light, can come together.

Mandaic transliteration

b-šuma ḏ-hiia rbia

dna dna
ziuak malka ḏ-ˁutria
ata l-ˁutria u-l-škinata
dna ˁutria u-škinata
ḏ-hiziuia l-ziuak
kulhun birikta b-dilak barkia
birikta barkia b-dilak
u-miaqrilak ˁutria aminṭul ḏ-anat
mn ˁda ḏ-malka huit

malka birkak b-birikta rabtia
u-l-dilia hibil ziua ˁhablia
ˁhablia l-dilia hibil ziua
l-manhirinun
l-almia u-l-malkia
u-l-iardnia u-l-škinata kulhin
mn riš b-riš

hibil birkak b-birikta rabtia
u-l-adam kasia iahbak
adam birkak b-birikta rabtia
u-l-bhiria zidqa iahbak
iahbak l-bhiria zidqa
l-manhirinun u-l-mitaqninun l-dmauatun
mn riš b-riš

bhiria zidqa qam (Note: After qam ('to stand') is pronounced, there is a brief pause in the prayer as a circle of worshippers, originally in squatting positions circled around the base of the drabsha, stand up to place the klilas, which they were holding in their hands, onto the top of the drabsha.) ˁl ligraihun
u-b-iaminun ligṭuk
u-l-iardna ḏ-mia hiia asgun
u-tirṣuk l-midna ziuak l-iardna
mia u-ziuak b-hdadia mitkarkia (Note: Root: KRKL 'to encompass, bind' (Drower & Macuch 1963, A Mandaic dictionary))
mia u-ziuak mitkarkia b-hdadia
u-l-šilmai u-nidbai mitauzipia (Note: Root: YZP 'to borrow, lend, be added' (Drower & Macuch 1963, A Mandaic dictionary))
halin hinun bhiria zidqa ḏ-l-iardna masgin
b-ziuak dilak minihria anat
naṭrinun u-qaiminun
u-asiq maṣbutaihun l-riš
hiia zakin

English translation

In the name of Hayyi Rabbi.

It has shone forth! It has shone forth!
Your radiance, king of uthras.
It came upon the uthras and shkintas.
It shone forth upon the uthras and shkintas,
when they beheld your radiance.
All of them spoke a blessing upon you.
The uthras spoke a blessing upon you,
and honored you because you have emerged
through the hand of a king.

The king has blessed you with a great blessing,
and he gave it to me, Hibil Ziwa.
He gave it to me, Hibil Ziwa,
in order to give light
to the worlds, to the kings,
to the yardnas, and to the shkintas, and all
for ever and ever.

Hibil blessed you with a great blessing
and gave you to Adam Kasia.
Adam blessed you with a great blessing
and gave you to the Chosen Righteous.
He gave you to the Chosen Righteous
in order to enlighten and brighten their counterparts
for ever and ever.

The Chosen Righteous stood on their feet
and took you with their right hands.
And they went to the Yardna of Living Water
and set you up so that your radiance might shine forth upon the yardna.
Water and your radiance bind one another.
Water and your radiance bind one another,
and they added themselves to Shilmai and Nidbai.
These, the Chosen Righteous who go to the yardna,
they enlighten through your radiance.
Guard them and strengthen them
and make their maṣbuta successful.
Life is victorious.

== Gallery ==
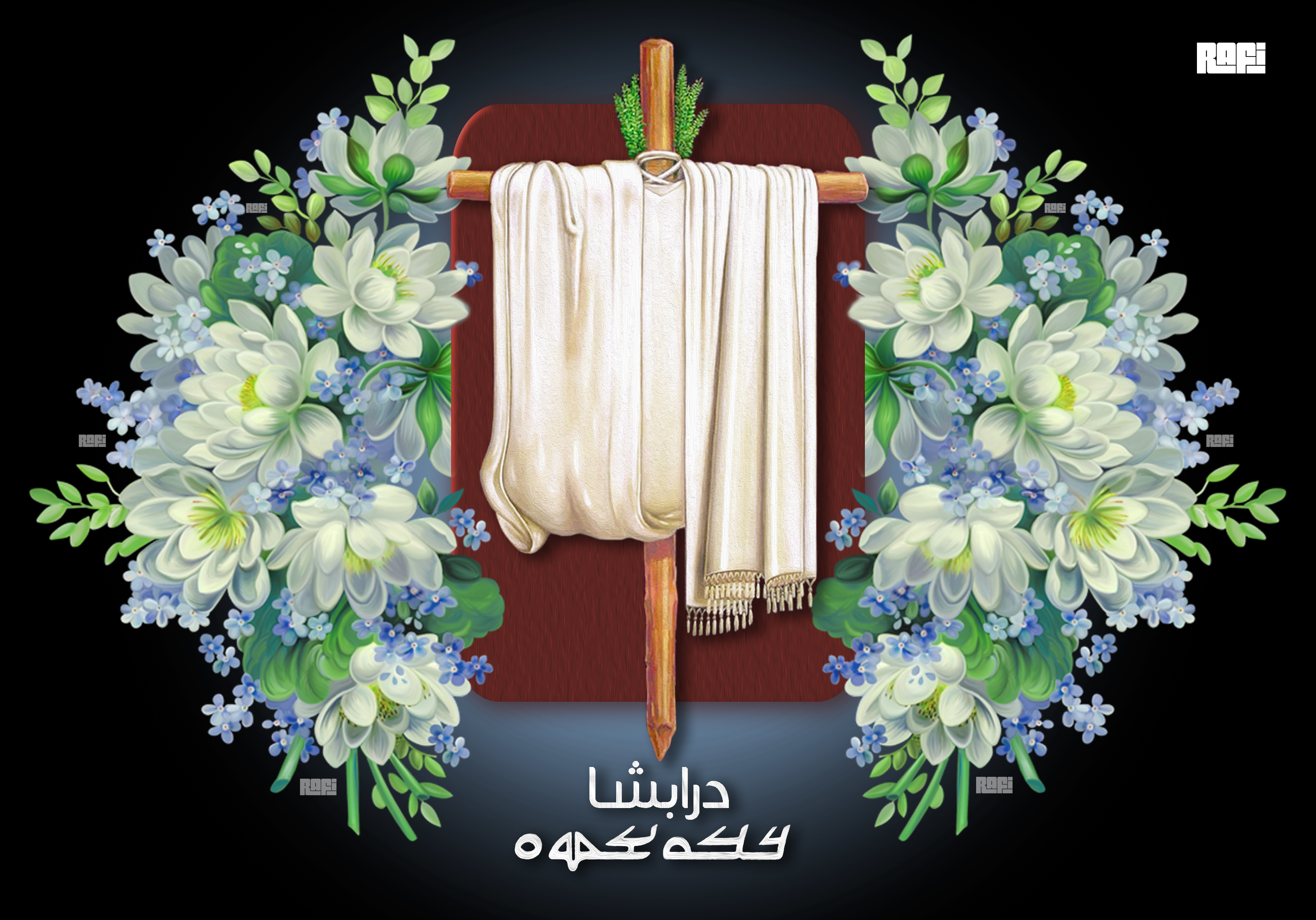
Artistic rendition of the Mandaean drabsha

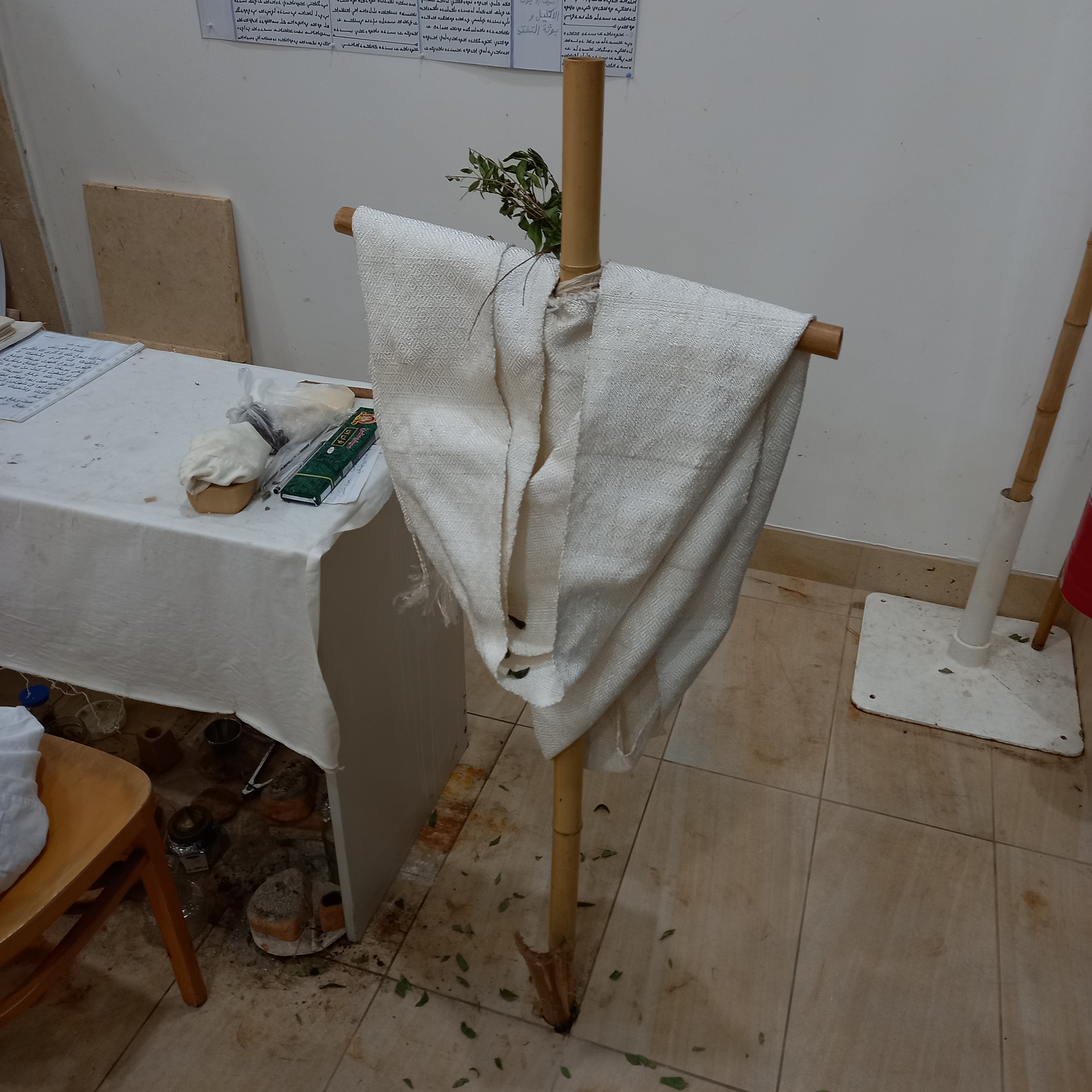
Drabsha planted into the floor at Yahya Yuhana Mandi in Sydney, Australia

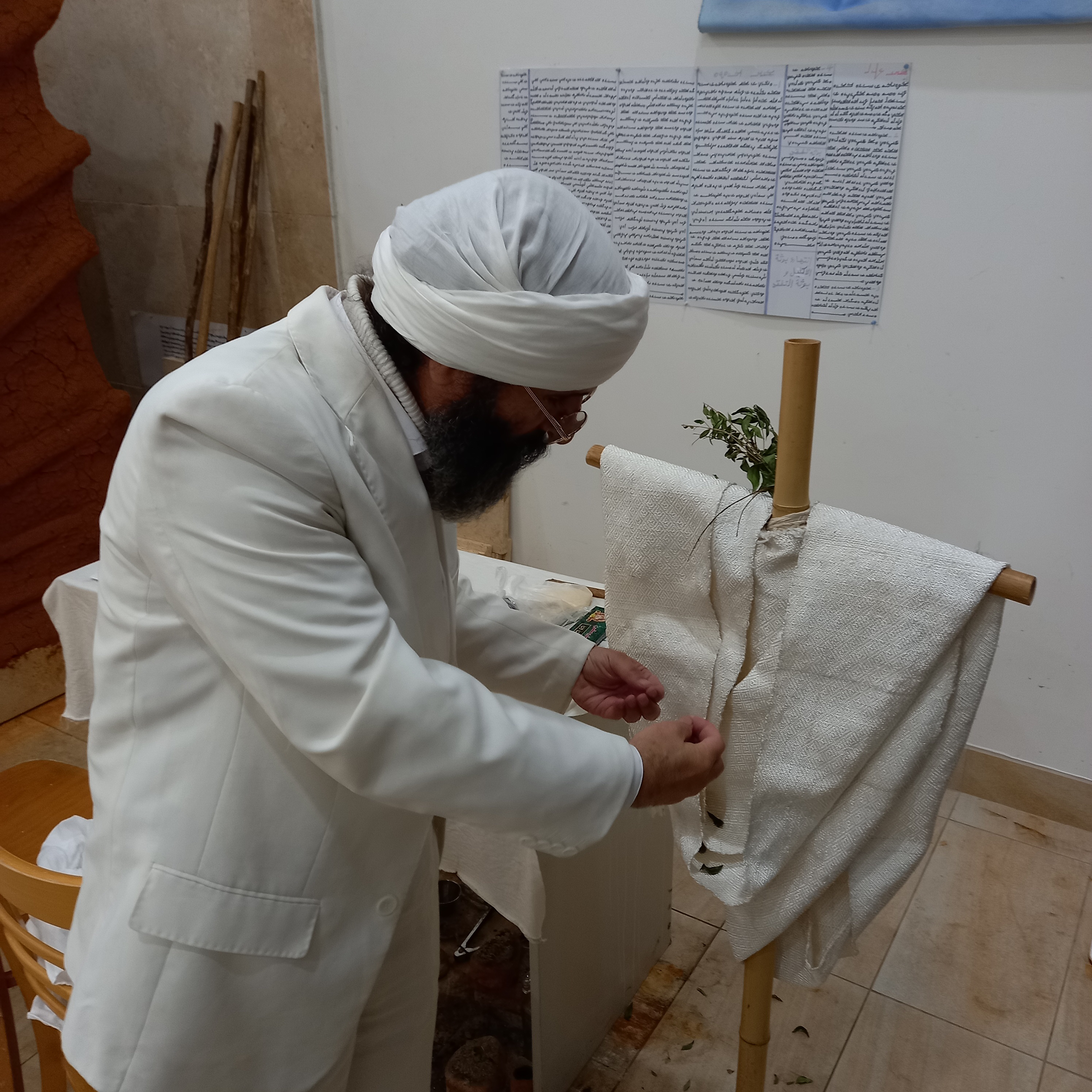
Tarmida Sahi Bashikh preparing the drabsha at Yahya Yuhana Mandi in Sydney, Australia

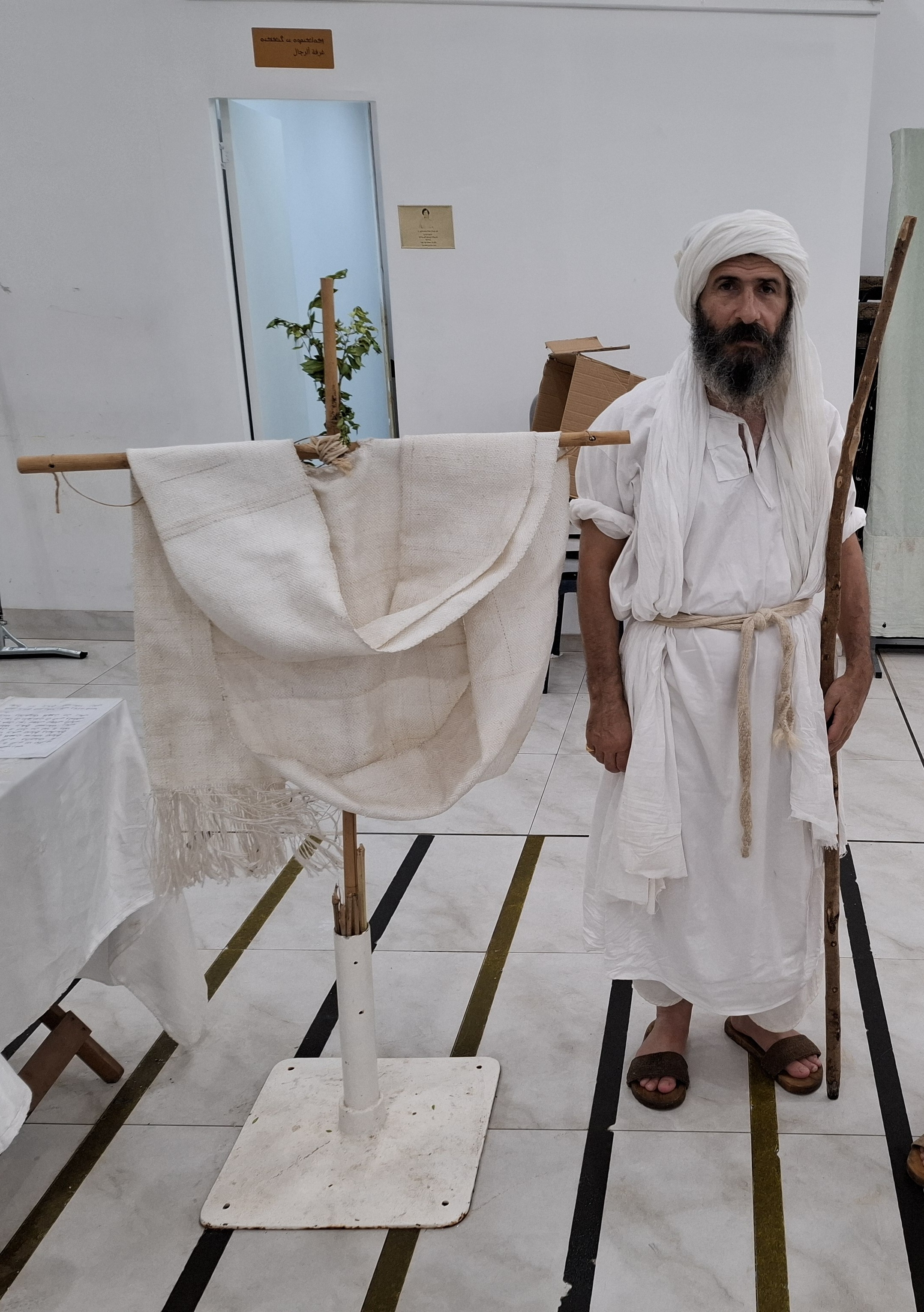
Tarmida Sahi Bashikh standing next to a drabsha, at Yahya Yuhana Mandi during Parwanaya 2025

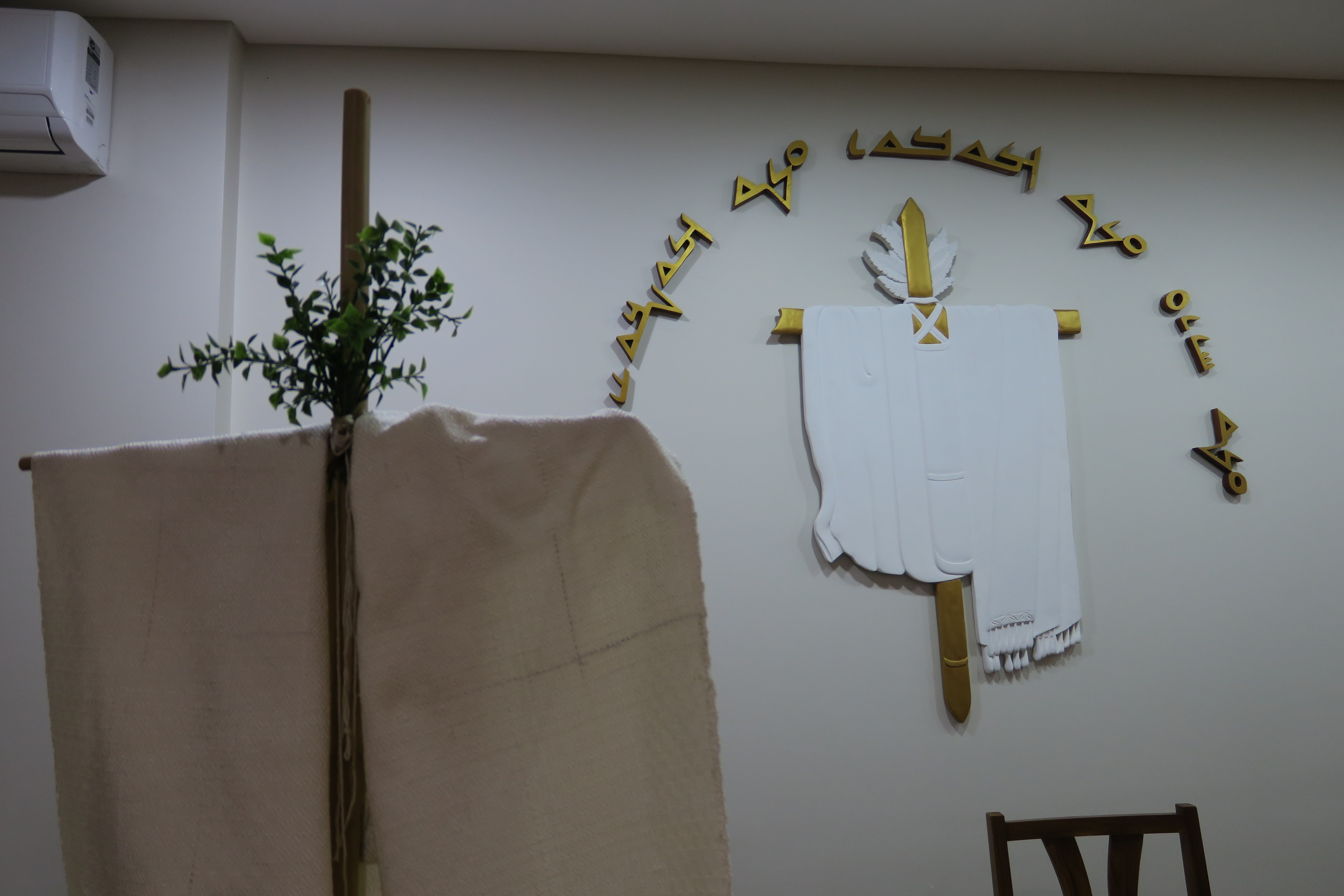
An actual drabsha (left) next to a symbolic drabsha (center) at Ganzibra Dakhil Mandi in Liverpool, Sydney, Australia

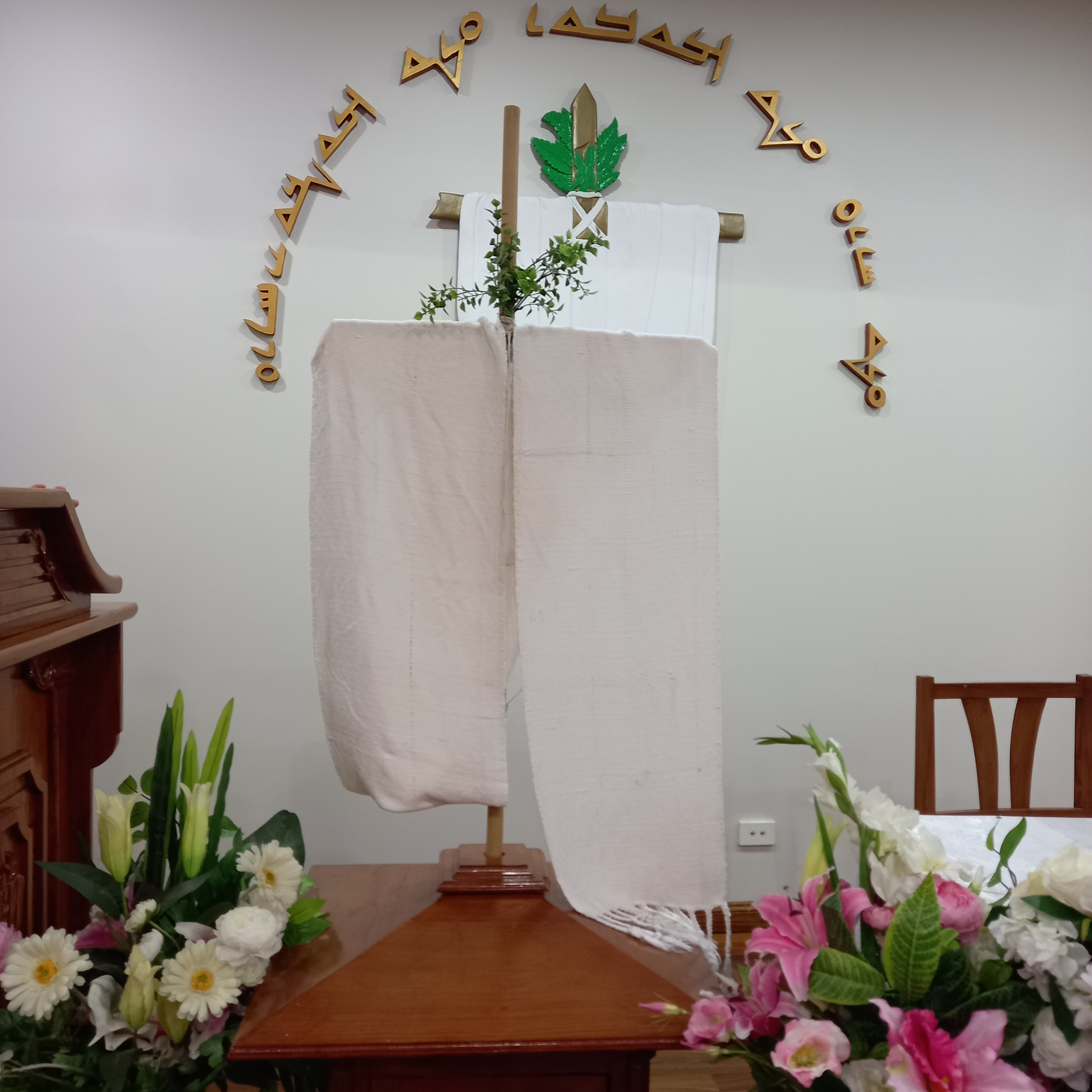
Front side of a drabsha at Ganzibra Dakhil Mandi in Liverpool, Sydney, Australia

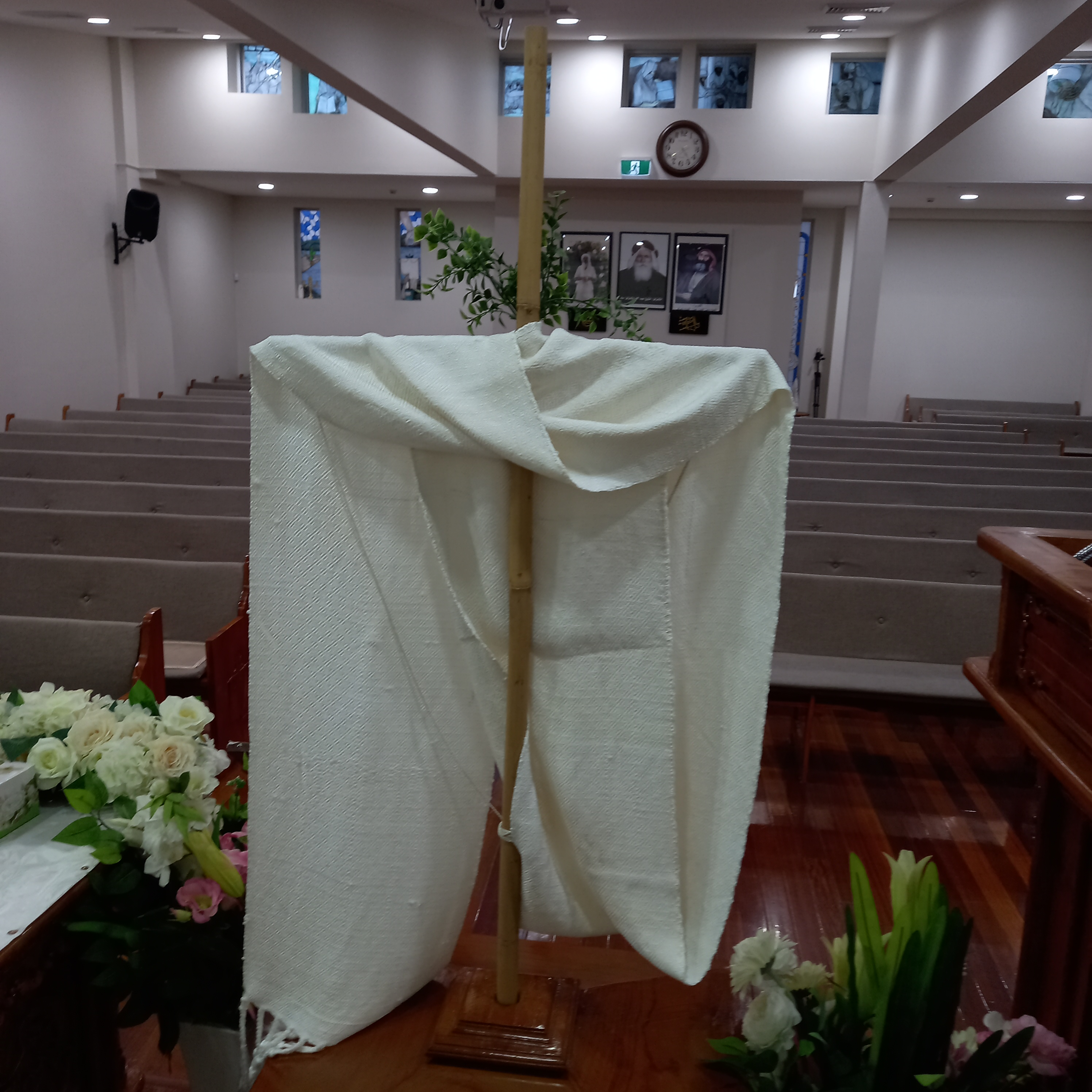
Back side of a drabsha at Ganzibra Dakhil Mandi in Liverpool, Sydney, Australia

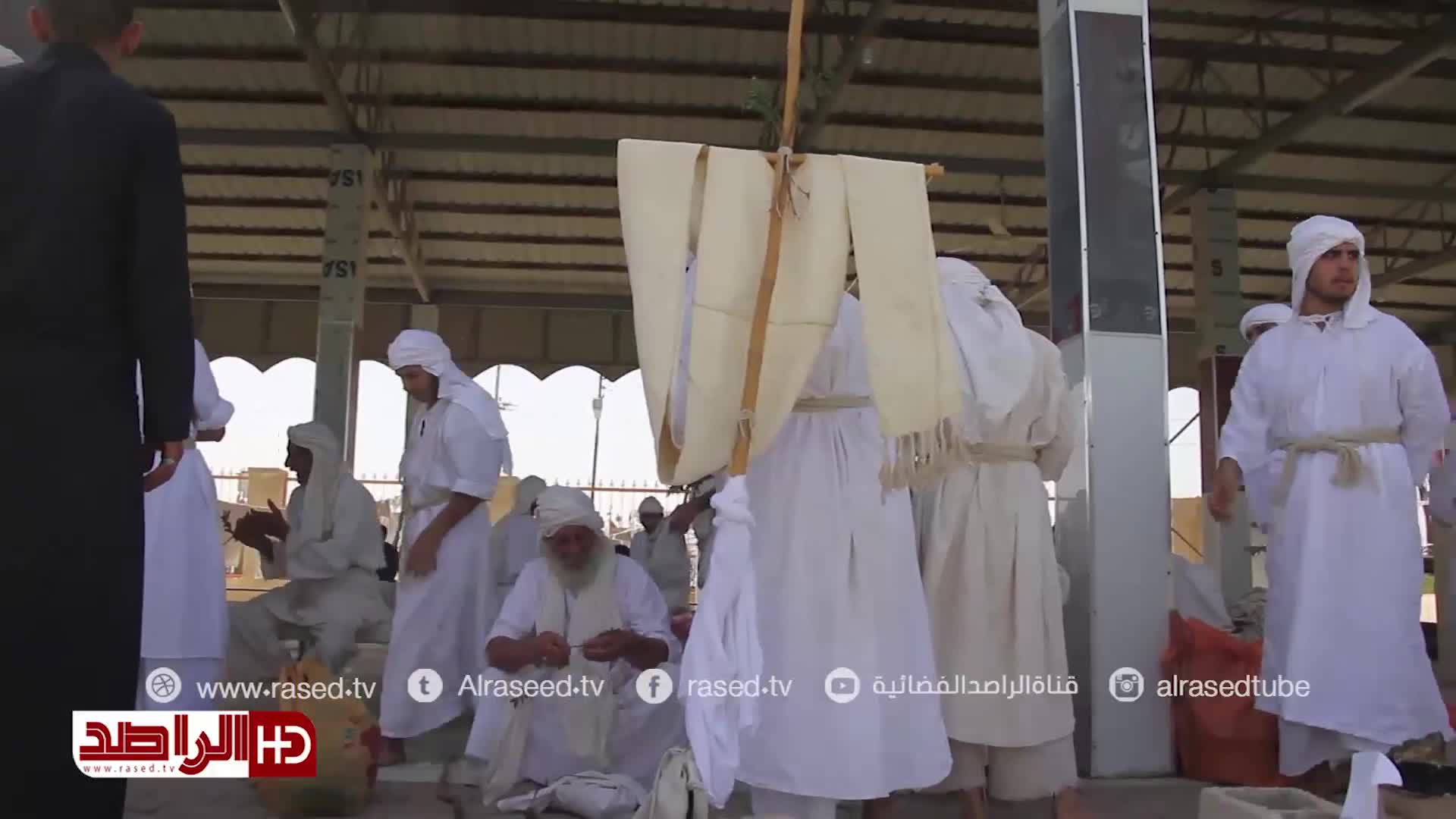
A drabsha (center) carried during a Parwanaya festival held in Maysan Governorate, southern Iraq in March 2019

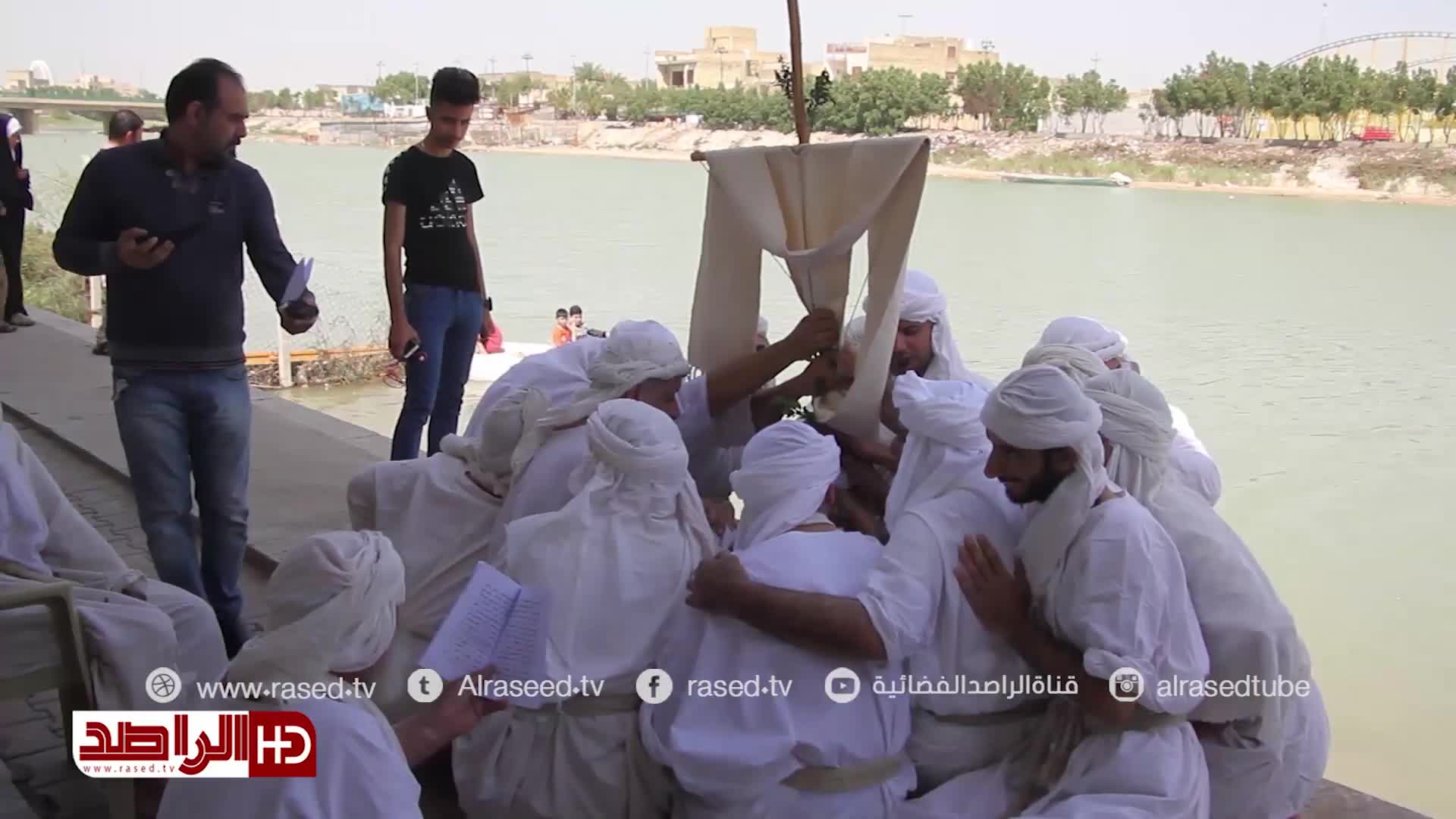
A drabsha being carried to the Tigris River

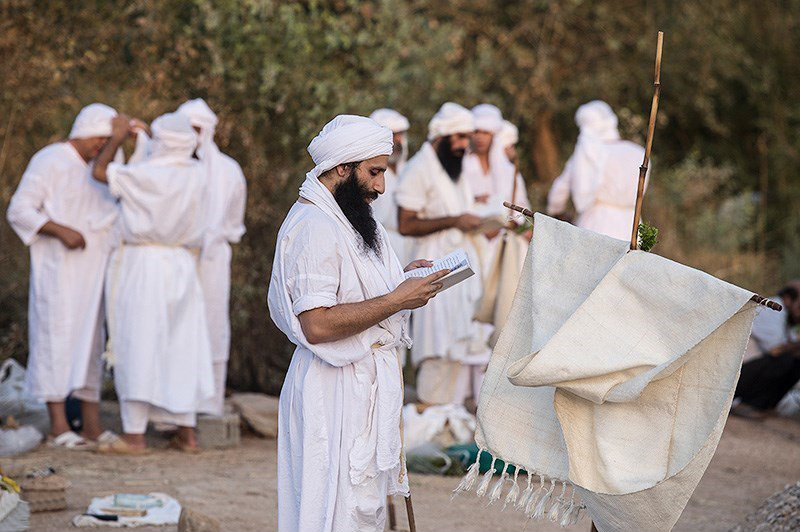
Example of a drabsha (right), with a priest reciting from a prayerbook during a masbuta ritual by the Karun River in Ahvaz, Iran (center)

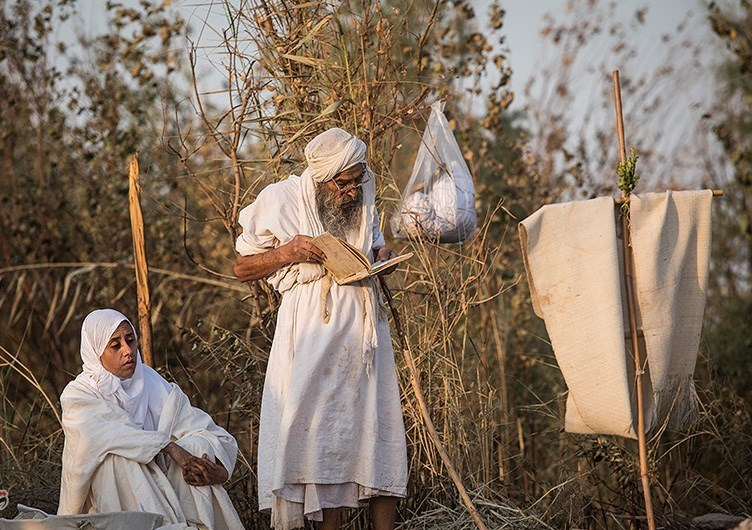
Example of a drabsha (right), with a tarmida priest reciting from a prayerbook during a masbuta ritual by the Karun River in Ahvaz, Iran (center)

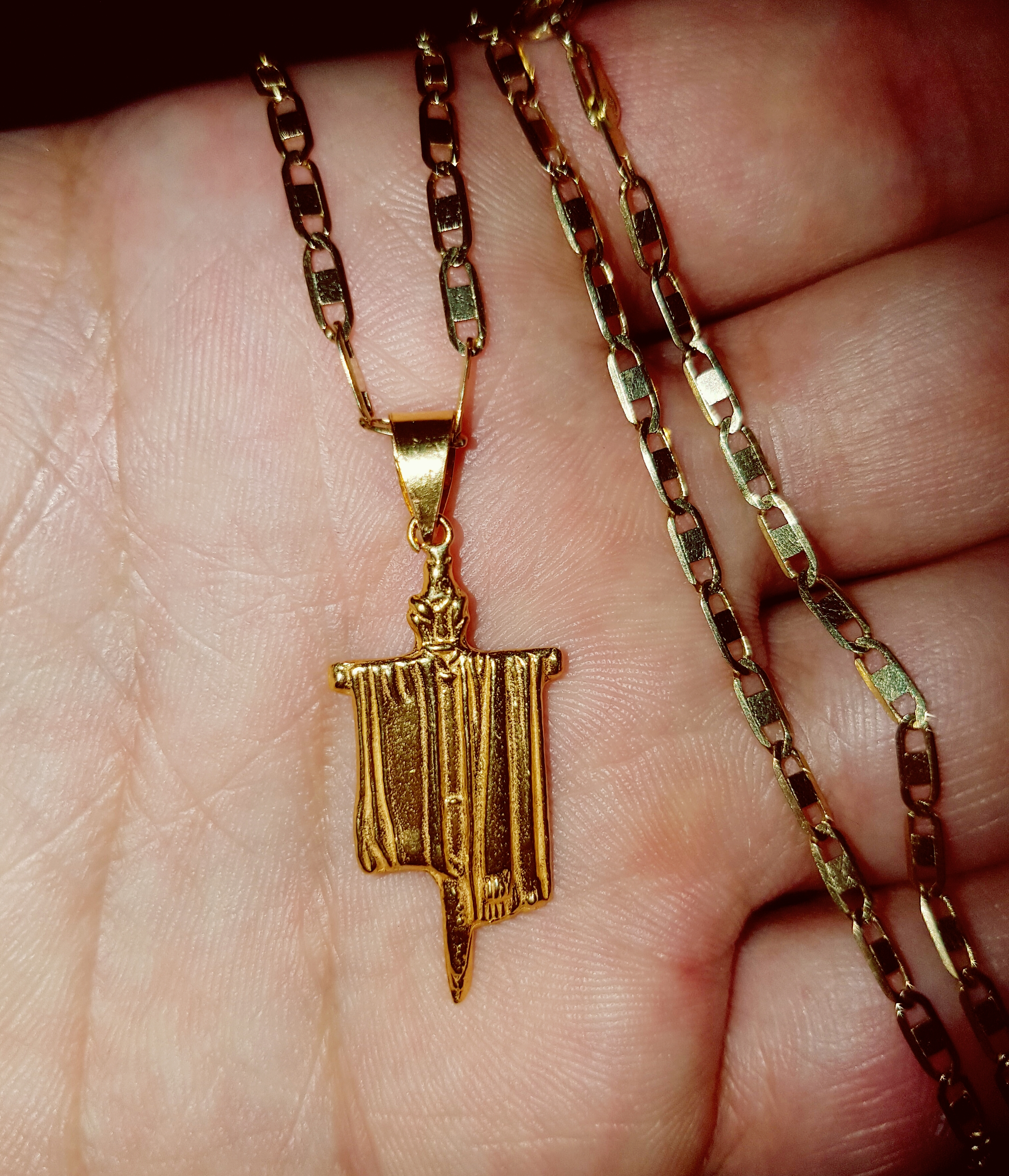
A drabsha (darfash) golden necklace

== See also ==
- Kushta – Mandaic religious concept of truth
- Rasta (Mandaeism) – Mandaean ceremonial garment
- Temple menorah – Ancient Hebrew ritual candelabrum and Jewish symbol
