= Anana (Mandaeism) =

Religious concept of clouds in Mandaeism

In Mandaeism, an anana (Classical Mandaic: ࡀࡍࡀࡍࡀ, lit. 'cloud', Modern Mandaic pronunciation: [aˈnɑnɑ]) is a heavenly cloud in the World of Light that is considered to be the dwelling place of uthras. An anana can also be interpreted as a female consort.

The Mandaic term anana was also frequently used to refer to women in the Mandaean community.

== Names of ananas ==
Right Ginza Book 17, Chapter 1 lists the names of several ananas and their uthras, many of which are gufnas (personified grapevines).

| Anana(s) | Uthra(s) | Notes |
|---|---|---|
| Nhur-Hiia-Anana | Mara ḏ-Rabuta | lit. 'Cloud of the Light of Life"' |
| Kimṣat-Anana | little Pirun | lit. 'Kimṣat Cloud' |
| Ptula ("the Virgin") | Hibil | |
| Šahrat-ʿbdat-u-Kišrat | Great Mighty Mana and Niṭufta | |
| Yasmus | Šarat, the great hidden first gupna | |
| Sidar-Kasia | Yura | lit. 'Hidden Sidar' |
| Tatagmur | first-born son of Yušamin | |
| Pihtat-u-Nihrat-u-Nipqat-mn-gu-mia (two clouds) | Nṣab and Anan-Nṣab | lit. 'Pihtat and Nihrat and Nipqat between the waters' |
| Barat and Ethrauribat | Sar and Sarwan | |
| Nhar and Khar | Šilmai and Nidbai | |

In Right Ginza Book 3, Adakas Ziwa is paired with Anana ḏ-Nhura ("cloud of light").

In the Asut Malkia, Bihrat Anana is mentioned as the name of an anana.

== Niṭufta ==
Niṭufta Modern Mandaic pronunciation: [niˈtˤʊftɑ] is a similar concept in Mandaeism. In Qulasta prayers such as the Asut Malkia, the word niṭufta (spelled niṭupta ࡍࡉࡈࡅࡐࡕࡀ), which originally means 'drop' or 'droplet' and has sometimes also been translated as 'cloud', is also often used as an appellation to refer to the consorts of uthras. It can also be interpreted as the semen or seed of the Father (Hayyi Rabbi), or a personified drop of "water of life". The Asut Malkia mentions Šarat and Kanat as names of individual niṭuftas.

Similarly, the Apocalypse of Adam (one of the Nag Hammadi texts) mentions droplets and clouds from heaven.

== See also ==
- Shkinta
- Gufna
- Uthra
