= Gufna =

Religious concept of vines in Mandaeism

In Mandaeism, a gufna (Note: /f/ is an allophone of /p/ in Mandaic.) or gupna (Classical Mandaic: ࡂࡅࡐࡍࡀ, lit. '(grape)vine', Modern Mandaic pronunciation: [ˈgʊfna]) is an uthra that is described as a personified grapevine in the World of Light.

== List of gufnas ==
In various Mandaean texts, several heavenly beings are described as personified grapevines (gupna) in the World of Light. For example, Right Ginza 15.8 lists the following gupnas in order:

- Taureil (Taurʿil) – also mentioned in Qulasta prayers 379 and 381. Right Ginza 4 identifies Taureil as another name for Anan Anṣab. According to Right Ginza 15.8, the gupna Taureil "rests at the river of the pure Tarwan."
- Rwaz (Ruaz) – also mentioned in Right Ginza 6 and 15.7, and in Qulasta prayers 71, 117, 196, 212, and 379
- Yusmir – also mentioned in Mandaean Book of John 62 and Qulasta prayers 14 (as "Yusmir-Yusamir"), 18, 28, 52, 171, and 379. According to Right Ginza 15.8, the gupna Yusmir "rests upon the earth of Sam Ziwa." In The Baptism of Hibil Ziwa, Yusmir is the name of a shganda in the World of Light.
- Šarhabeil (Šarhabʿil) – also described as the Great First Radiance in Qulasta prayers 25 and 381. In Right Ginza 18, Šarhabeil and her husband Šurbai were the only survivors after the world was destroyed during the second epoch of the universe. According to Right Ginza 15.8, the gupna Šarhabeil "rests upon the earth of Hibil Ziwa."
- Šar (Shar; literal meaning: 'he was firm') – also mentioned in Qulasta prayers 36 and 374. Šar-Ziwa is mentioned in Qulasta prayer 372. Also identified with Hibil Ziwa. According to Right Ginza 15.8, the gupna Šar "rests upon the earth of the First Life."
- Pirun – also mentioned in Qulasta prayers 36, 374, and 379 and in the first chapter of the Mandaean Book of John. Pirun is described as a banner (drabsha) in Qulasta prayer 333, and as a "torrent" (river) in Qulasta prayer 378. In the Baptism of Hibil Ziwa (DC 35), Pirun is the name of a heavenly tree.
- Yawar is identified in Right Ginza 15.8 as "the first Gupna."

Yusmir, Šar, and Pirun are also mentioned in the first chapter of the Mandaean Book of John.

Right Ginza 17.1 mentions Šarat (literal meaning: 'she was firm') as a gupna. Šarat-Niṭupta is mentioned in Mandaean Book of John 68, and Šahrat is mentioned in Qulasta prayer 188.

In Mandaeism, vines are used to symbolize believers, or 'those of the true faith'.

== See also ==
- Anana (Mandaeism)
- Uthra
- True Vine in Christianity
