= Urfeil and Marfeil =

Pair of uthras in Mandaeism

- Other names: ʿUrpʿil and Marpʿil
- Abode: World of Light

In Mandaeism, Urfeil and Marfeil (or ʿUrpʿil and Marpʿil; Classical Mandaic: ࡏࡅࡓࡐࡏࡉࡋ ࡅࡌࡀࡓࡐࡏࡉࡋ, Modern Mandaic pronunciation: [urfiˈel u marfiˈel]) are a pair of uthras (angel or guardian) in the World of Light that are always mentioned together. They are mentioned in Books 3 and 5 (Chapter 1) of the Right Ginza, as well as in Qulasta prayer 168.

In Right Ginza 5.1, Yawar Ziwa appoints Urfeil and Marfeil over the east to watch over Ur.

== Etymology ==
The name Marfeil is cognate with the Hebrew word מַרפֵּא marpe, which means 'healing.'

== See also ==
- List of angels in theology
- Adathan and Yadathan
- Shilmai and Nidbai
- Yufin-Yufafin
- Xroshtag and Padvaxtag in Manichaeism
