= Adam Pagria =

Bodily Adam in Mandaeism

Adam Pagria or Adam Pagra (Classical Mandaic: ࡀࡃࡀࡌ ࡐࡀࡂࡓࡉࡀ, bodily or physical Adam) in Mandaeism is the physical body of the primeval man and therefore of all humans. According to Mandaeism, all human bodies can be traced back to this primeval body. In contrast, Adam Kasia is the primeval soul of mankind.

The creator and uthra Ptahil, son of Abatur, created Adam Pagria with his helpers, the Seven Planets and the Twelve Zodiacs, from clay and other elements. With the help of Ruha, Ptahil gave Adam Pagria the spirit. Manda d-Hayyi and Hibil gave the World of Light soul (Adam Kasia) to the body. Hawa (ࡄࡀࡅࡀ, Eve) was then created as a companion for the first bodily Adam.

== See also ==
- Adam Kasia
- Adam Ha-Rishon, the physical Adam in Judaism

== Sources ==
- E. S. Drower (2020). The Secret Adam: A Study of Nasoraean Gnosis. Wipf and Stock Publishers. ISBN 978-1-5326-9763-0. OCLC 1149751154.
- E. S. Drower (2002). The Mandaeans of Iraq and Iran: Their Cults, Customs, Magic Legends, and Folklore (2 ed.). Gorgias Press. ISBN 978-1-931956-49-9. OCLC 1025203311.
