= Yasana =

Heavenly gate in the Mandaean religion

In Mandaeism, Yasana (Classical Mandaic: ࡉࡀࡎࡀࡍࡀ) is a heavenly gate in the World of Light. The term is mentioned in Chapter 12 of the Right Ginza, which describes it as "the great gate of Yasana, the place where a throne has been erected for the builder of the heaven and the earth" (baba rba ḏ-iasana, dukta ḏ-traṣlḥ kursia l-ban ʿšumia u-arqa).

== See also ==
- Tarwan
