= Shihlun =

Uthra in Mandaeism

- Abode: World of Light
- Texts: Mandaean Book of John Chapter 62

Shihlun (Classical Mandaic: ࡔࡉࡄࡋࡅࡍ, romanized: Šihlun, lit. 'he sent me'; also spelled Shehlon) is an uthra (angel or guardian) in the World of Light. In the Mandaean Book of John, he is noted for his opposition to the creation of the material universe by Ptahil and his assistant uthras.

== In Mandaean scriptures ==
Chapter 62 of the Mandaean Book of John contains a story of Shihlun's opposition to the creation of the material world by Ptahil and other uthras. Ptahil, who fills the role of the demiurge, creates the material world with the help of the uthras Hibil, Shitil, and Ayar ("aether"). However, Shihlun chastises Ptahil and calls him an "evil man, son of an evil man" (biša br biša).

Shihlun is mentioned in Qulasta prayers 194 and 210. Right Ginza Book 11 also mentions the uthra Shihlun as "the good light who gives excellent advice for his brothers."

== See also ==
- List of angels in theology
