= Uthra =

Inhabitants of the World of Light in Mandaeism

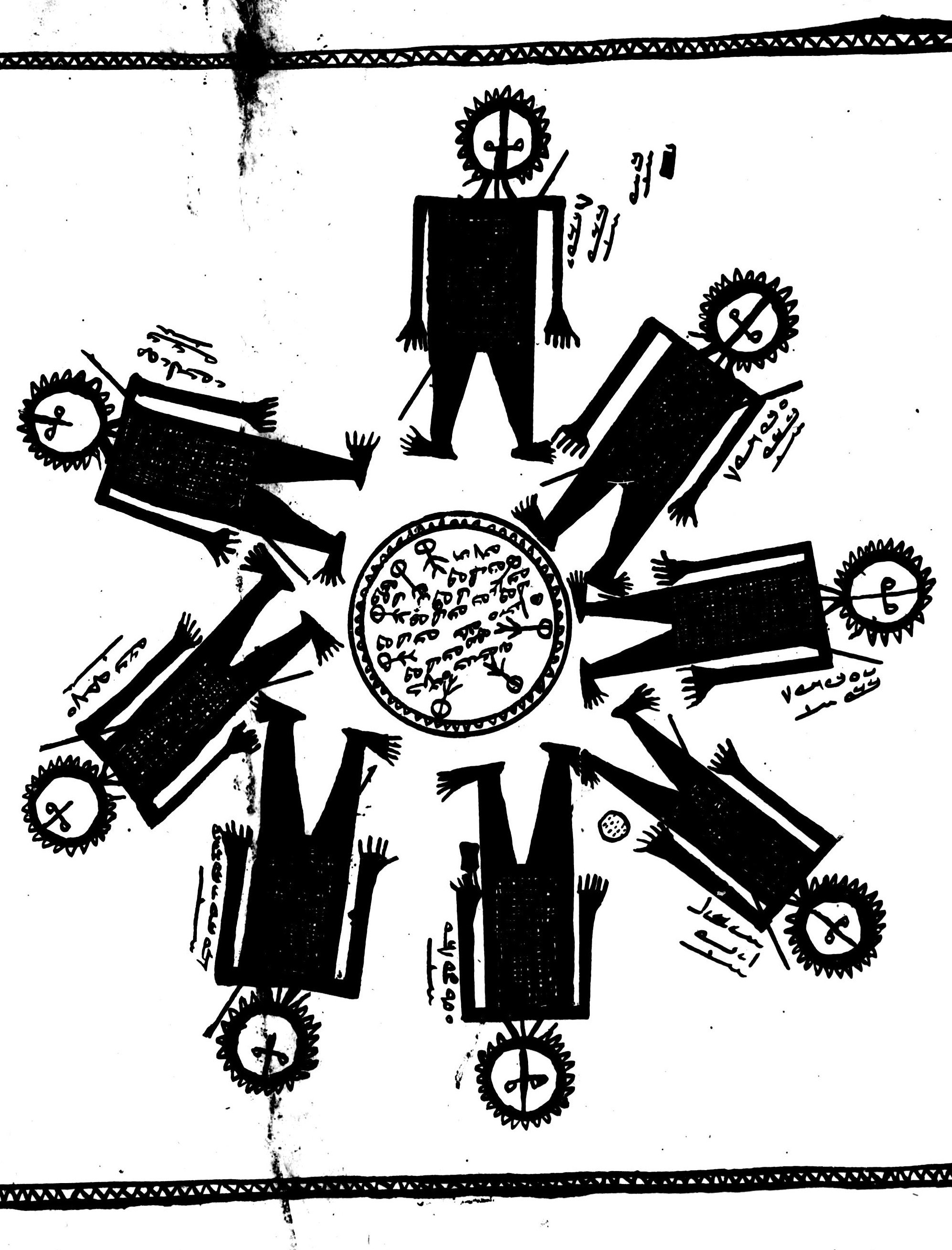
An illustration of several uthras in Zihrun Raza Kasia (Ms. DC 27). Clockwise starting from the top-center figure (standing upright): Nidbai, Adathan and Yadathan (as two separate figures), Hibil Ziwa, an ašganda (priest's assistant, the only figure without a margna), Mara ḏ-Rabuta ("Father of Greatness"), Anuš, Šilmai

An uthra or ʿutra (Classical Mandaic: ࡏࡅࡕࡓࡀ, Neo-Mandaic oṯrɔ, traditionally transliterated eutra; plural: ʿuthrē, traditionally transliterated eutria) is a "divine messenger of the light" in Mandaeism. Charles G. Häberl and James F. McGrath translate it as "excellency". Jorunn Jacobsen Buckley defines them as "Lightworld beings, called 'utras (sing.: 'utra 'wealth', but meaning 'angel' or 'guardian')." Aldihisi (2008) compares them to the yazata of Zoroastrianism. According to E. S. Drower, "an 'uthra is an ethereal being, a spirit of light and Life."

Uthras are benevolent beings that live in škinas (ࡔࡊࡉࡍࡀ, "celestial dwellings") in the World of Light (alma ḏ-nhūra) and communicate with each other via telepathy. Uthras are also occasionally mentioned as being in anana ("cloud"; e.g., in Right Ginza Book 17, Chapter 1), which can also be interpreted as female consorts. Many uthras also serve as guardians (naṭra); for instance, Shilmai and Nidbai are the guardians of Piriawis, the Great Jordan (yardna) of Life. Other uthras are gufnas, or heavenly grapevines.

Uthras that accompany people or souls are known as parwanqa (ࡐࡀࡓࡅࡀࡍࡒࡀ), which can be translated as "guide", "envoy", or "messenger".

== Etymology ==
Uthra is typically considered to be cognate with the Aramaic ʿuṯrā 'riches', derived from the Semitic root *ʿ-ṯ-r 'to be rich'. Based on that etymology, E. S. Drower suggests a parallel with the South Arabian god of storms, ʿAṯtar, who provides irrigation for the people.

However, that etymology is disputed by Charles G. Häberl (2017), who suggests it is the ʾaqtal pattern noun *awtərā 'excellency', derived from the Semitic root *w-t-r 'to exceed'.

== Naming ==
Uthras often bear the term Ziwa "Radiance" (Classical Mandaic: ࡆࡉࡅࡀ, romanized: Ziua) appended to their names owing to their origins in the World of Light. In Manichaeism, the Syriac term Ziwa (ܙܝܘܐ) is also used to refer to Jesus in Manichaeism as Ishoʿ Ziwā (ܝܫܘܥ ܙܝܘܐ "Jesus the Splendor"), who is sent to awaken Adam and Eve to the source of the spiritual light trapped within their physical bodies.

Pairs of uthras also typically have rhyming names. The names can be alliterative (e.g., Adathan and Yadathan), or one name may have an infixed consonant or syllable (e.g., Kapan and Kanpan). In Manichaeism, pairs of celestial beings can also have rhyming names, such as Xroshtag and Padvaxtag. Gardner (2010) discusses other parallels with Manichaeism.

== List of uthras ==
=== Commonly mentioned uthras ===
Below is a partial list of uthras. Some names of uthras are always listed together as pairs.

- Manda d-Hayyi, the savior uthra whose name means "Gnosis of (the) Life"
- The triad consisting of the three sons of Adam according to Book 1 of the Left Ginza:
  - Hibil (Abel)
  - Shitil (Seth)
  - Anush (Enosh)
- The emanations:
  - Yushamin (the Second Life): the primal uthra
  - Abatur (the Third Life): father of Ptahil
  - Ptahil (the Fourth Life): the creator of the material world
- Sam Ziwa (Shem): Shem is cognate with the angelic soteriological figure Sam Ziwa
- Shilmai and Nidbai are a pair of uthras who serve as the guardian spirits (naṭra; plural: naṭria) of the Jordan and the delegates of Manda d-Hayyi, who carry out the work of God (Hayyi Rabbi). (See Xroshtag and Padvaxtag in Manichaeism.)
- Adathan and Yadathan are a pair of uthras who stand at the Gate of Life, praising and worshipping God.

=== In the Ginza Rabba ===
Other uthras mentioned in the Ginza Rabba are:

- Barbag (Bar-Bag), also called Azaziʿil – mentioned in Right Ginza 4 as the "head of the 444 škintas."
- Bhaq Ziwa – uthra; also Abatur
- Bihram – uthra of baptism
- Bhir (meaning 'chosen, tested, proven') – mentioned as part of a pair with Bihrun in Right Ginza 8.
- Bihrun – '[the Life] chose me'. Mentioned in Qulasta prayers 105 and 168, Right Ginza 8, and Mandaean Book of John 62.
- Din Mlikh – uthra who appears in the revelation of Dinanukht
- Gubran and Guban – mentioned in Right Ginza 5.1. In the Mandaean Book of John, Gubran Uthra helps Nbaṭ lead a rebellion against Yushamin and his 21 sons.
- Ham Ziwa and Nhur Ziwa
- Kapan and Kanpan
- Nbaṭ (Classical Mandaic: ࡍࡁࡀࡈ, lit. 'Sprout') – the King of Air, the first great Radiance
- Nṣab (Classical Mandaic: ࡍࡑࡀࡁ, lit. 'Plant') – also called Nṣab Rabba and Nṣab Ziwa. Son of Yushamin. Frequently mentioned with Anan-Nṣab ('cloud of Nṣab', a female consort) as a pair. Mentioned in Right Ginza 8 and 17.1, and Qulasta prayers 25, 71, 105, 145, 168, 186, 353, and 379.
- Nbaz (Nbaz Haila) – Mentioned in Right Ginza 1.4 and 6 as the guardian of a matarta. He is mentioned in Right Ginza 6 as "Nbaz-Haila, the Lord of Darkness, the great anvil of the earth."
- Nurʿil and Nuriaʿil – mentioned in Right Ginza 5.1.
- Piriawis Yardna – also a heavenly stream and personified vine (gufna)
- Rahziʿil – mentioned in Right Ginza 11, in which he is described as "the well-armed one who (is) the smallest of his brothers."
- Sam Mana Smira (Smir Ziwa 'pure first Radiance', or Sam Smir Ziwa; Smir means 'preserved') – one of the Twelve. Sam Mana Smira is mentioned in Qulasta prayers 9, 14, 28, 77, and 171, and Right Ginza 3 and 5.4. Yawar Mana Smira and Sam Smira Ziwa are mentioned in Right Ginza 14. Lidzbarski (1920) translates Sam Mana Smira as "Sām, the well-preserved Mānā."
- Sar and Sarwan – mentioned in Qulasta prayers 25, 105, 168, and 378, and Right Ginza 5.1, 8, and 17.1.
- Ṣaureil (Ṣaurʿil) – the angel of death; also an epithet for the Moon (Sén)
- Shihlun (lit. '[The Life] has sent me')
- Simat Hayyi – treasure of life; typically considered to be the wife of the uthra Yawar Ziwa
- Tar and Tarwan. Tarwan is mentioned in Right Ginza 8 and in Qulasta prayer 105. The "land of Tarwan" is mentioned in Qulasta prayers 190 and 379 and Right Ginza 15.17, while "pure Tarwan" (taruan dakita), or sometimes "the pure land of Tarwan," is mentioned as a heavenly place in Right Ginza 15.2, 15.8, 15.16, and 16.1. "Tarwan-Nhura" (Tarwan of Light) is mentioned in Qulasta prayers 4 and 25.
- ʿUrpʿil and Marpʿil
- Yasana – mentioned in Right Ginza 12.1 as the "gate of Yasana."
- Yathrun – father of Shilmai
- Yawar Ziwa – Dazzling Radiance, also known as Yawar Kasia or Yawar Rabba; husband of Simat Hayyi. Yawar can also mean 'Helper.'
- Yufin-Yufafin (Yupin-Yupapin)
- Yukabar (Yukhabr; Classical Mandaic: ࡉࡅࡊࡀࡁࡀࡓ) – mentioned in Qulasta prayers 74, 77, 173, and 379, and in Right Ginza 15.6 (as Yukabar-Kušṭa), 16.4, and 17.1 (as Yukabar-Ziwa). Yukabar helps Nbaṭ fight a rebellion against Yushamin in the Mandaean Book of John.
- Yukašar (Yukhashr; Classical Mandaic: ࡉࡅࡊࡀࡔࡀࡓ) – source of Radiance. Mentioned in Qulasta prayers 53, 54, 55, 64, 77, and 343, and in Right Ginza 4 as Yukašar-Kana (kana means 'place' or 'source'). In the Mandaean Book of John, he is portrayed as the son of Ptahil.
- Yur (also Yur-Yahur) is one of the matarta guardians. Qulasta prayer 12 begins with the name Yur, son of Barit. Yur is also mentioned in Qulasta prayers 18 and 171.
- Yura – "jewel". Mentioned in Right Ginza 15.7, 15.8, 16.1, and 17.1 as Yura Rba Ganzibra (literally "Great Yura the Ganzibra" or "Great Yura the Treasurer"). Yura is mentioned in Qulasta prayers 214 and 379 as well.
- Yurba (spelled Jōrabba by Lidzbarski) – also called the fighter. Yurba is identified with Shamish, the sun. Book 18 of the Right Ginza equates Yurba with Adonai of Judaism, while Gelbert (2017) identifies Yurba with Yao. Mentioned in Right Ginza 3, 5.3 (which mentions Yurba as a matarta guardian), 8, 12.1, 15.5, and 18 and Left Ginza 2.22 and 3.45. Mandaean Book of John 52 is a narrative dedicated to Yurba. Yurba is often mentioned as engaging in conversation with Ruha.
- Zarzeil Ziwa (Zarzʿil Ziwa) – mentioned in Right Ginza 5.1 and 15.8.
- Zhir (meaning 'secured') – often mentioned as part of a pair with Zihrun
- Zihrun (sometimes spelled as Zahrun; literally means 'the Life warned me') – Zihrun is mentioned in Right Ginza 4 as Zihrun-Uthra (also called Yusmir-Kana) and Right Ginza 8, and in Mandaean Book of John 62 as a "morning star." Qulasta prayers 2, 3, 240, and 319 mention him as Zihrun Raza ("Zihrun the Mystery"). He is described as an uthra of radiance, light, and glory in prayers 2 and 3, with prayer 2 mentioning Manda d-Hayyi as an emanation of Zihrun. Qulasta prayers 332, 340, 341, and 374 mention him as the name for a drabsha (banner), and prayer 347 mentions him as Zihrun-Šašlamiel. He is the subject of Zihrun Raza Kasia.

In Right Ginza 5.1, Yawar Ziwa appoints four uthras each over the four directions to watch over Ur (see also Guardians of the directions):

- west: Azaziʿil, Azaziaʿil, Taqpʿil and Margazʿil the Great
- east: ʿUrpʿil, Marpʿil, Taqpʿil and Hananʿil
- north: Kanpan and Kapan, Gubran and Guban
- south: Hailʿil, Qarbʿil, Nurʿil and Nuriaʿil

=== In the Qulasta ===
A few Qulasta prayers list the names of lesser-known uthras in sets of four. They are referred to as the "four men, the sons of peace" (arba gubria bnia šlama) in Qulasta prayers 8, 49, 71, 75, and 77, as well as Right Ginza 5.4, 14, and 15.8. Qulasta prayer 17 and Left Ginza 1.2 refer to them as the "four uthras, the sons of light" (arba ʿutria bnia nhura). Mark J. Lofts (2010) considers them to be parallel to the Four Luminaries in Sethian Gnosticism. Qulasta prayers 17 and 77 list them as:

- Rhum-Hai ("Mercy")
- Īn-Hai ("Wellspring" or "Source of Life")
- Šum-Hai ("Name")
- Zamar-Hai ("Singer")

Qulasta prayer 49 lists the "four men, the sons of peace" as:

- Īn-Hai
- Šum-Hai (Šum can mean both Shem and "Name")
- Ziw-Hai ("Radiance")
- Nhur-Hai ("Light")

These four uthras are considered to be the kings (malkia) of the North Star, who give strength and life to the sun. Together with Malka Ziwa (another name for Hayyi Rabbi), they make up the "five primal beings of light." Conversely, Mandaeans consider the "five lords of the World of Darkness" to be Zartai-Zartanai, Hag and Mag, Gap and Gapan, Šdum, and Krun (the paired demons are considered to rule together as single lords). (See Manichaeism § The World of Light for similar parallels.)

Other minor uthras mentioned in the Qulasta are:

- Hamgai-Ziwa, son of Hamgagai-Ziwa – mentioned in Qulasta prayer 3 and Right Ginza 15.5.
- Hash (Haš) – mentioned in Qulasta prayer 77. Haš-u-Fraš Uthra ("Hash and Frash Uthra") is mentioned in Qulasta prayers 168 and 169.
- Hauran and Hauraran – mentioned in Qulasta prayers 14, 27, and 28. In prayer 27, Hauran is described as a vestment, while Hauraran is described as a covering. Hauraran is also mentioned in Right Ginza 15.2, Left Ginza 3.60, and Mandaean Book of John 70.
- Hazazban (Haza-Zban) – mentioned in Qulasta prayers 19 and 27 as an uthra who sets wreaths (klila) upon the heads of Mandaeans who are performing masbuta. Sometimes the klila itself is also called Hazazban. Also mentioned in the Ginza Rabba as the matarta guard Zan-Hazazban in Right Ginza 5.3 and 6. Hazazban possibly means 'this time.'
- ʿIt ʿNṣibat ʿUtria (or ʿIt Yawar bar ʿNṣibat ʿUtria – mentioned in Qulasta prayer 5. Prayer 46 mentions ʿNiṣbat-ʿUtria.
- Kanfiel – mentioned in Qulasta prayer 168
- Karkawan-Ziwa – mentioned in Qulasta prayer 49
- Piriafil-Malaka – mentioned together with Piriawis-Ziwa in Qulasta prayers 13 and 17
- Rham and Rhamiel-Uthra – mentioned in Qulasta prayer 378
- Ṣanaṣiel – mentioned in Qulasta prayers 77 and 105
- Šihlbun – mentioned in Qulasta prayer 105
- Ṣihiun, Pardun, and Kanfun – mentioned in Qulasta prayer 77
- S'haq Ziwa (pronounced [sʰāq zīwā]) – mentioned in Qulasta prayers 18, 105, and 173. Š'haq is also mentioned in Right Ginza 15.5. In the 1012 Questions, S'haq Ziwa or Adam S'haq Ziwa (literally "Adam was Bright Radiance") is equated with Adam Kasia.
- Shingilan (or Šingilan-Uthra) – mentioned in Qulasta prayer 105 and Mandaean Book of John 1 and 69. According to Mandaean Book of John 1, "Šingilan-Uthra takes the incense holder and brings it before the Mana."
- ʿUṣar, also known as ʿUṣar-Hiia or ʿUṣar-Hai ("Treasure of Life"), as well as ʿUṣar-Nhura ("Treasure of Light") – mentioned in Qulasta prayers 17, 27, 40, 42, 49, 75, and 77; mentioned together with Pta-Hai in prayers 27, 49, and 77.
- Yukašar – mentioned in Qulasta prayers 53, 54, 55, 64, 77, and 343
- Yaha-Yaha – mentioned in Qulasta prayer 15
- Yaluz-Yaluz – mentioned in Qulasta prayers 22 and 50
- Zha-Zha – mentioned in Qulasta prayer 15
- Zhir – mentioned in Qulasta prayer 26

=== In other texts ===
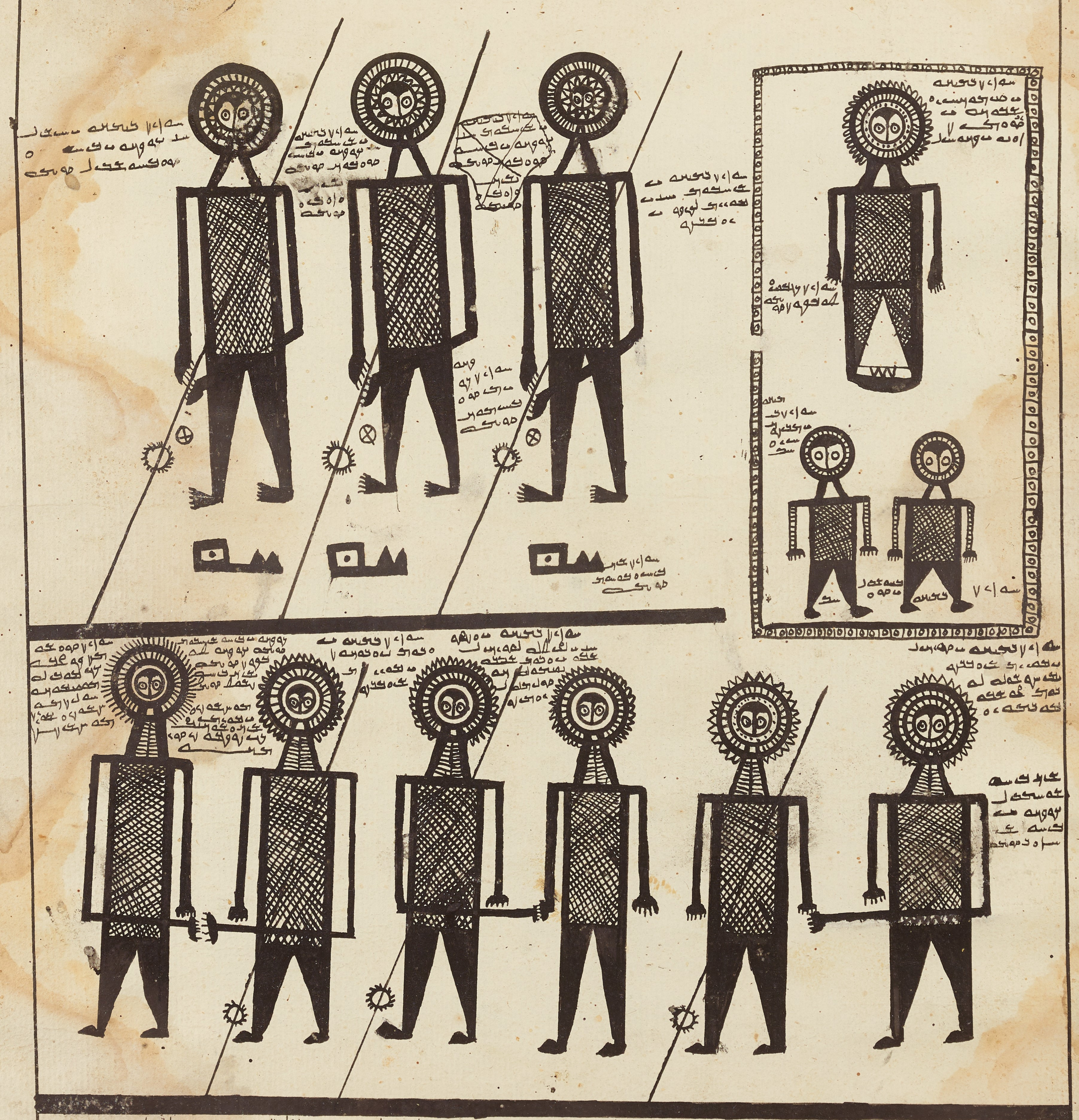
Uthras in the Diwan Abatur (DC 8): Hibil (upper left corner), Bihram (to the right of Hibil), Simat Hayyi, (upper right corner), along with Adam, Anush, Shitil, and Yadathan (bottom row of uthras)

In the Mandaean Book of John, Etinṣib Ziwa (Classical Mandaic: ࡏࡕࡉࡍࡑࡉࡁ ࡆࡉࡅࡀ, lit. 'Splendid Transplant') is an uthra who starts a battle against Nbaṭ.

Some uthras mentioned in the Diwan Abatur include:

- Arspan, an uthra connected with water and baptism; also the name of a throne in the Diwan Abatur
- Bihdad, an uthra who assists Abatur at the scales in the Diwan Abatur
- ʿQaimat – daughter of Yushamin, has 15 children by Ptahil
- Rahmiʿil – often mentioned in love charms
- Samandarʿil – a flower and blossom spirit; also mentioned in Qulasta prayer 105
- Šarhabiel – In the Diwan Abatur, he is the son of Ptahil who rules over purgatory. Šarhabʿil has been depicted as both male and female, and is also the epithet of the ritual incense cup.
- Šhaq – son of Ptahil and ruler of a matarta; means 'cloud(s)'

Mentioned in the Alma Rišaia Zuṭa:

- Mdabriel

=== Gufna ===
In various Mandaean texts, several heavenly beings are described as personified grapevines (gufna or gupna) in the World of Light.

=== Trees ===
In various Mandaean manuscripts, uthras can also be described as personified heavenly trees. Many Mandaean scrolls contain illustrations of the trees. Some of them are:

- Dmut Kušṭa (MS Asiatic. Misc. C. 12)
  - Abatur Rama, as a date palm
  - Habšaba, as a fig tree
  - Yawar Ziwa, as a great cotton plant
  - Yushamin, as a mulberry tree
- Diwan Abatur (DC 8)
  - Shatrin
  - Gabriel Rihmat ('she-loved-Gabriel', a date palm)
- Baptism of Hibil Ziwa (DC 35)
  - Nṣab
  - Pirun
- Alma Rišaia Rba (DC 41): Haneil, Marmag, Mašqeil, Nahreil, Nahureil, Rahimeil (depicted twice), Samkieil, Tarwan

=== Anana ===
The Mandaic term anana (Classical Mandaic: ࡀࡍࡀࡍࡀ) is typically translated as 'cloud,' but can also be interpreted as a female consort of an uthra, and hence also an uthra.

In Qulasta prayers such as the Asut Malkia, the word niṭufta (spelled niṭupta), which originally means 'drop' and has sometimes also been translated as 'cloud', is also often used as an appellation to refer to the consorts of uthras. It can also be interpreted as the semen or seed of the Father (Hayyi Rabbi), or a personified drop of "water of life".

== Parallels in other religions ==
Mandaean names for uthras have been found in Jewish magical texts. Abatur appears to be inscribed inside a Jewish incantation bowl in a variant form as "Abiṭur". The name Ptḥiʾl (Hebrew: פתחיאל), apparently a variation of Ptahil, is found in Sefer HaRazim, listed among other angels who stand on the ninth step of the second firmament.

== See also ==
- Angels in Judaism
- List of angels in Sefer HaRazim
- Angels in Islam
- Jinn in Islam
- Christian angelology
- Mandaean cosmology
- Yazata in Zoroastrianism
- Sukkal in Mesopotamian mythology
- Kami in Shinto religion
- Deva (Buddhism)
- Nat (deity) in Burmese folk religion
- Asut Malkia
- Ziwa (Aramaic)
- Anana (Mandaeism)
- Gufna
