= Yura (Mandaeism) =

Uthra in Mandaeism

- Abode: World of Light
- Texts: Right Ginza, Qulasta

In Mandaeism, Yura (Classical Mandaic: ࡉࡅࡓࡀ, romanized: Iura, lit. 'jewel') is an uthra (angelic or celestial being). Yura is mentioned in Right Ginza 15.7, 15.8, 16.1, and 17.1, as well as in Qulasta prayers 214 and 379.

In Right Ginza 15.7, 16.1, and 17.1, he is mentioned as Yura Rba Ganzibra, meaning "Great Yura the Ganzibra" or "Great Yura the Treasurer"; Right Ginza 15.8 and the Qulasta prayers mention him simply as Yura Rba ("Great Yura").

While Shishlam is considered to be the prototypical Mandaean priest (of any rank), Yura may be thought of as the prototypical ganzibra.

== See also ==
- Shishlam
- Ganzibra
