= Yufin-Yufafin =

Uthra in Mandaeism

- Abode: World of Light

Equivalents
- Jewish: Jophiel (Metatron)

In Mandaeism, Yufin-Yufafin or Yupin-Yupapin (Classical Mandaic: ࡉࡅࡐࡉࡍ ࡅࡉࡅࡐࡀࡐࡉࡍ, romanized: iupin u-iupapin, Modern Mandaic pronunciation: [juˈfin u iufɑˈfin]) is an uthra (angel or guardian) in the World of Light. In the Ginza Rabba, Yufin-Yufafin is mentioned in Books 3 and 5.4 of the Right Ginza and Book 1 of the Left Ginza, whereas "Yufin-Uthra" is mentioned in Book 4 of the Right Ginza. He is also mentioned in many Qulasta prayers, including prayers 5, 9, 22, 28, 46, 77, 105, and 171, in which he is often mentioned along with uthras such as Sam Mana Smira and Nbaṭ.

== Etymology ==
Nathaniel Deutsch (2000) links Yufin-Yufafin with Yophiel, one of the names of the angel Metatron in Jewish mysticism. Deutsch also observes many parallels between Metatron and Abatur.

== See also ==
- List of angels in theology
