= Ziwa (Aramaic) =

Aramaic religious term

Ziwa (also transliterated as ziua) is an Aramaic term that is typically translated as 'radiance' or 'splendor.' It is frequently used as an epithet for celestial beings and manifestations of God in Gnostic religions such as Mandaeism and Manichaeism.

The Hebrew cognate is ziv (זיו).

== Scripts ==
Ziwa written in different scripts:

- Hebrew alphabet: זיוא
- Mandaic alphabet: ࡆࡉࡅࡀ
- Syriac alphabet: ܙܝܘܐ
- Arabic script: زیوا

== Mandaeism ==
In Mandaeism, uthras (celestial beings) often have the Mandaic term Ziwa / Ziua (Classical Mandaic: ࡆࡉࡅࡀ, meaning 'Radiance'; Neo-Mandaic pronunciation [ˈziː.wɔ]) attached after their names, due to their origins from the World of Light.

Pairs of uthras also typically have rhyming names (e.g., Adathan and Yadathan). Sometimes, one of the names within a pair may have an infixed consonant or syllable (e.g., Kapan and Kanpan).

Uthras commonly referred to as "Ziwa" include:

- Hibil Ziwa
- Sam Ziwa (or Sam Smira Ziwa)
- Yawar Ziwa
- Qmamir Ziwa (an epithet of Ṣaureil)

Other uthras that are also referred to as "Ziwa" include:

- Bhaq Ziwa (an epithet of Abatur)
- Etinṣib Ziwa
- Ham Ziwa and Nhur Ziwa
- Nbaṭ Ziwa
- Nṣab Ziwa
- Piriawis Ziwa
- Fraš Ziwa
- Zarzeil Ziwa
- Hamgai Ziwa, son of Hamgagai Ziwa
- Karkawan Ziwa
- S'haq Ziwa
- Šar Ziwa
- Yukabar Ziwa

Adam Kasia (the "hidden Adam") is also referred to as Adakas Ziwa in the Ginza Rabba. One of the epithets of Adam Kasia is S'haq Ziwa.

== Manichaeism ==
In Manichaeism, the Syriac term Ziwa (Syriac: ܙܝܘܐ) is also used to refer to Jesus as Ishoʻ Ziwā (Syriac: ܝܫܘܥ ܙܝܘܐ, Jesus the Splendor), who is sent to awaken Adam and Eve to the source of the spiritual light trapped within their physical bodies. In Chinese Manichaean sources, Ziwa is typically translated as 明 (pinyin: míng).

Ṣfat Ziwā, or The Keeper of the Splendor (Syriac: ܨܦܬ ܙܝܘܐ; Latin: Splenditenens; Chinese: 催光明使; lit. 'Urger of Enlightenment'), who holds up the ten heavens from above, is one of the five sons of The Living Spirit (Syriac: ܪܘܚܐ ܚܝܐ ruḥā ḥayyā) in the second creation.

In Manichaeism, pairs of celestial beings can also have rhyming names, such as Xroshtag and Padvaxtag.

== See also ==
- World of Light
- Nūr (Islam)
- Ohr in Jewish mysticism
- Divine light
