= Yukashar =

Uthra in Mandaeism

- Other names: Yukašar
- Abode: World of Light

Yukashar (also Yukašar or Yukhashr; Classical Mandaic: ࡉࡅࡊࡀࡔࡀࡓ, lit. 'source of Radiance', Modern Mandaic pronunciation: [juˈkʰɑʃar]) is an uthra (angel or guardian) in the World of Light.

== In Mandaean scriptures ==
Yukashar is mentioned in Qulasta prayers 53, 54, 55, 64, 77, and 343, and in Right Ginza 4 as Yukašar-Kana (kana means 'place' or 'source').

In the Mandaean Book of John, he is portrayed as the son of Ptahil.

== See also ==
- List of angels in theology
