= Zihrun =

Uthra in Mandaeism

- Other names: Zahrun
- Abode: World of Light
- Texts: Zihrun Raza Kasia

Zihrun (Classical Mandaic: ࡆࡉࡄࡓࡅࡍ, lit. 'he [the Life] warned me', Modern Mandaic pronunciation: [ˈzɪhrʊn]); sometimes also spelled Zahrun or Zahroon, Modern Mandaic pronunciation: [zahˈrun]), is an uthra (angel or guardian) in the World of Light. He is the main subject of the Mandaean scroll Zihrun Raza Kasia.

The uthra Zhir (meaning 'secured') is often mentioned as part of a pair with Zihrun.

Zihrun is also a Mandaean male given name. Well-known historical Mandaean priests named Zihrun include the 19th-century priest Ram Zihrun.

== In Mandaean scriptures ==
Zihrun is mentioned in Right Ginza 4 as Zihrun-Uthra (also called Yusmir-Kana, with Kana meaning 'source' or 'place') and Right Ginza 8, and in Mandaean Book of John 62 as a "morning star."

Qulasta prayers 2, 3, 240, and 319 mention him as Zihrun Raza ("Zihrun the Mystery"). He is described as an uthra of radiance, light, and glory in Qulasta prayers 2 and 3, with prayer 2 mentioning Manda d-Hayyi as an emanation of Zihrun. Qulasta prayers 332, 340, 341, and 374 mention him as the name of a drabsha (banner), and prayer 347 mentions him as Zihrun-Šašlamiel.

== See also ==
- List of angels in theology
