= Sam Ziwa =

Uthra in Mandaeism

- Other names: Sam, Sam Ziwa Dakia
- Abode: World of Light

Equivalents
- Jewish: Shem

In Mandaeism, Sam Ziwa (Classical Mandaic: ࡎࡀࡌ ࡆࡉࡅࡀ, Modern Mandaic pronunciation: [ˈsɑm ˈziwa]) or Sam (Sām) is an uthra (angel or guardian) from the World of Light. Sam Ziwa is considered to be the Mandaean equivalent of Shem. He is also considered to be a guardian of the soul.

Sam is also a Mandaean masculine given name (see for example Abdullah bar Sam).

In some prayers of the Qulasta such as the Asut Malkia and Shumhata, he is referred to as "Sam, the pure, first-produced, beloved, and great first radiance (ziwa)" (Classical Mandaic: ࡎࡀࡌ ࡆࡉࡅࡀ ࡃࡀࡊࡉࡀ ࡁࡅࡊࡓࡀ ࡄࡀࡁࡉࡁࡀ ࡓࡁࡀ ࡒࡀࡃࡌࡀࡉࡀ, romanized: Sam Ziua dakia bukra habiba rba qadmaia, Modern Mandaic pronunciation: [ˈsɑm ˈziwa ˈdaχja ˈbʊχra haˈbiba ˈrɑbbɑ qadˈmaja]). Similarly, in the opening line of Right Ginza 15.5, he is referred to as Sam Ziwa Dakia ("pure, radiant Sam").

== Sam Mana Smira ==
Sam Ziwa may be identified with Sam Mana Smira (Modern Mandaic pronunciation: [ˈsɑm ˈmɑnɑ (ə)ˈsmira]; also Smir Ziwa 'pure first Radiance', or Sam Smir Ziwa; Smir means 'preserved'), an uthra is mentioned in Qulasta prayers 9, 14, 28, 77, and 171, and Right Ginza 3 and 5.4. Yawar Mana Smira and Sam Smira Ziwa are mentioned in Right Ginza 14. Lidzbarski (1920) translates Sam Mana Smira as "Sām, the well-preserved Mānā."

== See also ==
- List of angels in theology
