= Tarwan =

Section of the Mandaean World of Light

In Mandaeism, Tarwan (Classical Mandaic: ࡕࡀࡓࡅࡀࡍ, romanized: Taruan, Modern Mandaic pronunciation: [tarˈwɑn]) is a section of the World of Light that is typically described as a "pure land."

The "land of Tarwan" is mentioned in Qulasta prayers 190 and 379 and Right Ginza 15.17, while "pure Tarwan" (taruan dakita), or sometimes "the pure land of Tarwan," is mentioned as a heavenly place in Right Ginza 15.2, 15.8, 15.16, and 16.1. "Tarwan-Nhura" (Tarwan of Light) is mentioned in Qulasta prayers 4 and 25.

== Etymology ==
The etymology of Tarwan is obscure. Gelbert (2005) suggests a connection with Parvaim, a mythical land mentioned in 2 Chronicles 3:6 as a source of gold.

== As an uthra ==
Tarwan is also the name of an uthra who is usually mentioned together with Tar. The duo Tar and Tarwan is mentioned in prayers such as the Asut Malkia (Qulasta prayer 105). Another pair of uthras, Sar and Sarwan, has names that rhyme with Tar and Tarwan; this duo is mentioned in Qulasta prayers 25, 105, 168, and 378, and Right Ginza 5.1, 8, and 17.1.

As an uthra, Tarwan is also mentioned in Right Ginza 8.

== As a heavenly tree ==
In Alma Rišaia Rba (DC 41), Tarwan is the name given to one of the heavenly trees.

== See also ==
- Mandaean cosmology
- Mshunia Kushta
- Pure land in Buddhism
- Pure Land Buddhism
