= Yawar Ziwa =

Uthra in Mandaeism

- Light
- Other names: Yawar
- Abode: World of Light
- Consort: Simat Hayyi

In Mandaeism, Yawar Ziwa (Classical Mandaic: ࡉࡀࡅࡀࡓ ࡆࡉࡅࡀ, lit. 'dazzling radiance', Modern Mandaic pronunciation: [ˈjawar ˈziwa]; also known as Yawar Kasia ࡉࡀࡅࡀࡓ ࡊࡀࡎࡉࡀ "Hidden Yawar", Modern Mandaic pronunciation: [ˈjawar ˈkæsjæ]; or Yawar Rabba ࡉࡀࡅࡀࡓ ࡓࡁࡀ "Great Yawar", Modern Mandaic pronunciation: [ˈjawar ˈrɑbbɑ]) is an uthra (angel or guardian) from the World of Light. He is the personification of light, as well as the head of reproductive powers.

Simat Hayyi, the personification of life, is married to Yawar Ziwa.

== Etymology ==
E. S. Drower translates Yawar Ziwa as "Dazzling Radiance", although Mark Lidzbarski translates Yawar as "helper."

== In the Ginza Rabba ==
Book 14 of the Right Ginza mentions Yawar as one of the first uthras to have been created, along with Yushamin.

Yawar is identified in Right Ginza 15.8 as "the first Gupna."

== In other Mandaean texts ==
In Dmut Kušṭa (MS Asiatic. Misc. C. 12), Yawar Ziwa is the name of one of the heavenly trees.

== As an epithet ==
Yawar Ziwa is also an epithet for several figures in Mandaean scripture, including:

- Abatur
- Hibil Ziwa
- Manda d-Hayyi

== Šum Yawar Ziwa ==
The Šum Yawar Ziwa (ࡔࡅࡌ ࡉࡀࡅࡀࡓ ࡆࡉࡅࡀ) is a sacred gold ring worn by Mandaean priests.

== See also ==
- List of angels in theology
