= Adam Kasia =

Hidden Adam in Mandaeism

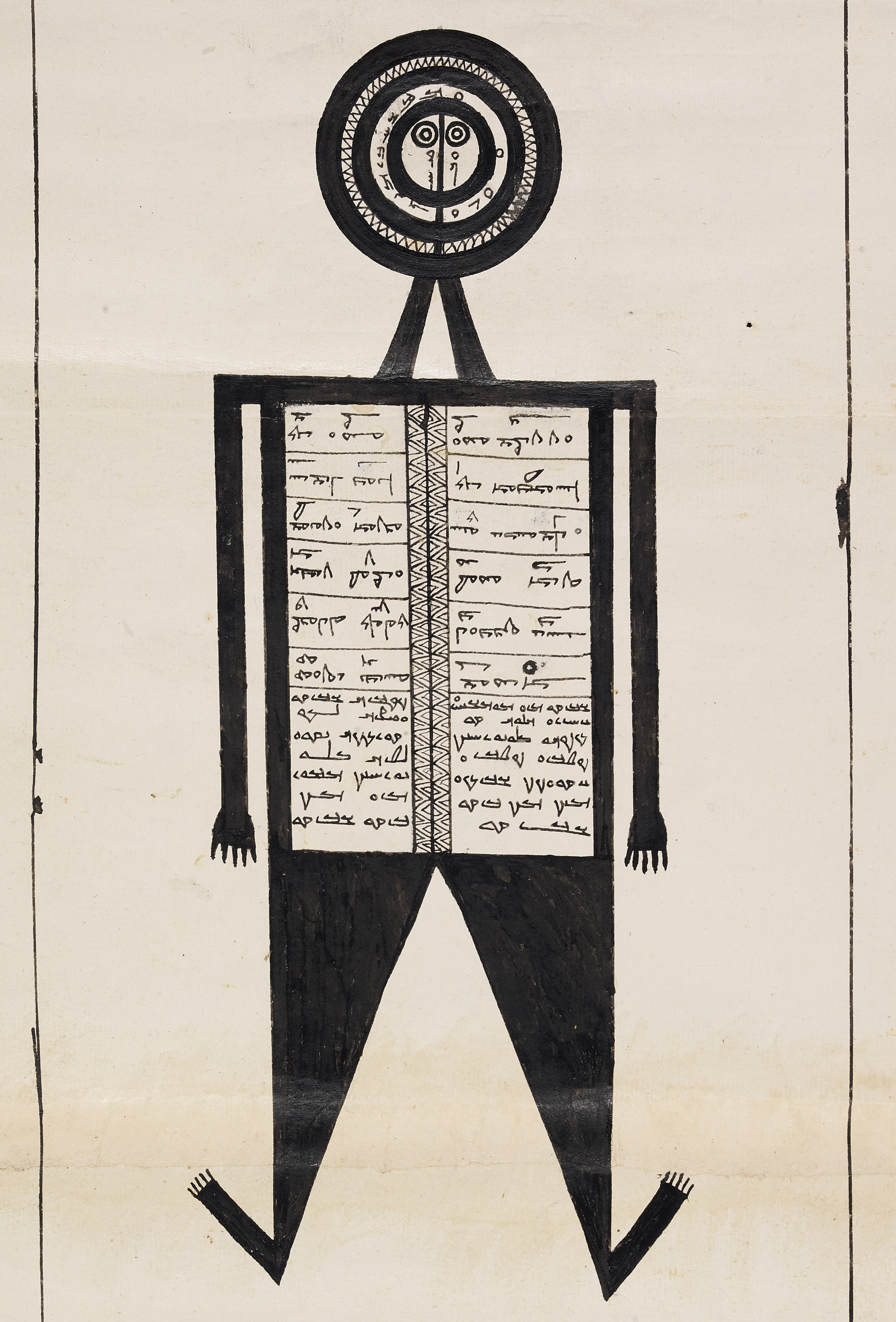
Illustration of Adam Kasia from Alma Rišaia Rba (DC 41), with the letters of the Mandaic alphabet inscribed inside

Adam Kasia (Classical Mandaic: ࡀࡃࡀࡌ ࡊࡀࡎࡉࡀ, Modern Mandaic pronunciation: [ˈɑdam ˈkæsjæ]; also referred to using the portmanteau Adakas ࡀࡃࡀࡊࡀࡎ or Adakas Ziwa in the Ginza Rabba) means "the hidden Adam" in Mandaic. The hidden Adam is also called Adam Qadmaiia (ࡀࡃࡀࡌ ࡒࡀࡃࡌࡀࡉࡉࡀ, "The First Adam"). In Mandaeism, it means the soul of the first man. He is also identified as Shishlam, the primordial priest.

Among the Mandaeans, Adam Kasia means the soul of every human. Adam Kasia shows many similarities with the Jewish idea of Adam Kadmon.

== Other names ==
Prayers in the Qulasta, such as the Asut Malkia, also refer to Adam as "Adam the First Man" (Adam Gabra Qadmaiia). The Thousand and Twelve Questions, a Mandaean priestly text, also refers to Adam Kasia as Adam-S'haq ('Adam-was-bright'), Adam-S'haq-Ziwa, or Adam-S'haq-Rba, who is described as the father of Shishlam, the archetype of the prototypical Mandaean.

== Hawa ==
The wife of Adam Kasia is Hawa Kasia ('hidden Eve'), also known as Hawa Ziwa ('radiant Eve') or Anana Ziwa ('radiant cloud').

== See also ==
- Adam and Eve
- Adam Kadmon in Judaism
- Adam Pagria (earthly Adam)
- Al-Insān al-Kāmil in Islam
- Cosmic Man
- Purusha in Hinduism
- Shishlam

== Sources ==
- Ethel Stefana Drower: The Secret Adam: A Study of Naṣoraean Gnosis, Clarendon Press, 1960, p. 21
- Ethel Stefana Drower: The Mandaeans of Iraq and Iran: Their Cults, Customs, Magic Legends, and Folklore, Gorgias Press, p. 73, ISBN 1-931956-49-9
- Manfred Lurker: A Dictionary of Gods and Goddesses, Devils and Demons, Routledge & Kegan Paul Ltd, 1987, p. 6
- Gerhard J. Bellinger: Knaurs Lexikon der Mythologie. 3100 Stichwörter zu den Mythen aller Völker von den Anfängen bis zur Gegenwart. Droemer Knaur Verlag, München 1989, ISBN 3-426-26376-9.
- Horst Robert Balz, Gerhard Krause, Gerhard Müller: Theologische Realenzyklopädie. Band 22. 1992.
