= Hayyi Rabbi =

Transcendental deity of the Mandaeans

- Other names: Hayyi, Life, The Great Life, The First Life, Lord of Greatness (Mara ḏ-Rabuta), King of Light, The Great Mind, Truth
- Abode: World of Light
- Symbol: Light, Living Water (Yardena)

Equivalents
- Manichaean: Father of Greatness
- Gnostic: Monad

In Mandaeism, Hayyi Rabbi or Heyyi Rabbi (Modern Mandaic pronunciation: [ˈhejji ˈrɑbbi]; Classical Mandaic: ࡄࡉࡉࡀ ࡓࡁࡉࡀ, romanized: Hiia Rbia, lit. 'The Great Life'), 'The Great Living God', is the supreme God from which all things emanate.

Hayyi Rabbi is also known as the "First Life", since during the creation of the material world, Yushamin emanated from Hayyi Rabbi as the 'Second Life'. According to Qais Al-Saadi,

[T]he principles of the Mandaean doctrine: the belief of the only one great God, Hayyi Rabbi, to whom all absolute properties belong; He created all the worlds, formed the soul through his power, and placed it by means of angels into the human body. So He created Adam and Eve, the first man and woman.

Mandaeans recognize God to be the eternal, creator of all, the one and only in domination, who has no partner. "God is worshiped alone and praised as the Supreme Force of the universe. He presides over all the worlds and all of creation." In Mandaeism, sahduta is the belief in One God (cf. Middle Aramaic שָׂהֲדוּתָא (sāhdutā) "testimony").

== Names ==
Hayyi Rabbi is also referred to in Mandaean scriptures as:

- Hiia Rbia Qadmaiia ࡄࡉࡉࡀ ࡓࡁࡉࡀ ࡒࡀࡃࡌࡀࡉࡉࡀ, Modern Mandaic pronunciation: [ˈhejji ˈrɑbbi qɑdˈmɑjji] ('The First Great Life')
- Hiia Rbia Nukraiia ࡄࡉࡉࡀ ࡓࡁࡉࡀ ࡍࡅࡊࡓࡀࡉࡉࡀ, Modern Mandaic pronunciation: [ˈhejji ˈrɑbbi nuˈkrɑjji] ('The Alien/Transcendental Great Life').

Other names used are:

- Mara ḏ-Rabuta ࡌࡀࡓࡀ ࡖࡓࡀࡁࡅࡕࡀ ('Lord of Greatness' or 'The Great Lord')
- Mana Rba ࡌࡀࡍࡀ ࡓࡁࡀ ('The Great Mind')
- Malka ḏ-Nhura ࡌࡀࡋࡊࡀ ࡖࡍࡄࡅࡓࡀ ('King of Light')
- Hiia Qadmaiia ࡄࡉࡉࡀ ࡒࡀࡃࡌࡀࡉࡉࡀ ('The First Life')

Kušṭa ('Truth', ࡊࡅࡔࡈࡀ) is also another name for Hayyi Rabbi, as well as Parṣupa Rba ('Great Immanence, Great Countenance'). In the Ginza Rabba (in Right Ginza books 1 and 2.1), the divine countenance of Hayyi Rabbi is referred to as the "Great Countenance of Glory" (ࡐࡀࡓࡑࡅࡐࡀ ࡓࡁࡀ ࡖࡏࡒࡀࡓࡀ Parṣupa Rba ḏ-ʿqara, Modern Mandaic pronunciation: [pɑrˈsˤufa ˈrɑbbɑ dˤiˈqɑra]). In the Asut Malkia, a commonly recited Mandaean prayer, another name for Hayyi Rabbi is Aba Rba ḏ-ʿqara (ࡀࡁࡀ ࡓࡁࡀ ࡖࡏࡒࡀࡓࡀ 'Great Father of Glory').

According to E. S. Drower, the name Great Mind or Great Mana refers to the "over-soul" or "over-mind", the earliest manifestation of Hayyi, from which the soul of a human might be seen as a spark or temporarily detached part. In book three of the Right Ginza, Hayyi is said to have "formed Himself in the likeness of the Great Mana, from which He emerged".

Brikha Nasoraia writes:

Sabian Mandaeism is clearly a monotheistic religion but it treats the subject in its own unique way. The Sabian Mandaean view of God differs from the Abrahamic religions in an important way in that God is not the creator of this earthly world but the creator of the Light World[s] (Almia ḏ-Nhura). God is the First Cause of the creation of everything. He creates life as the 'First' manifestation. This First Life grows and emerges in various forms, levels and dimensions. God creates the 'Divine Primordial Elements' from which and by which the formation of the worlds and lives in all formed and emanated. God is worshiped alone and praised as the Supreme Force of the universe. He presides over all the worlds and all of creation. Yet the Sabian Mandaeans believe that the creation of the earthly life comes about through the command of God, but it is entrusted to a lesser emanation, also known as the fourth life (Ptahil) with the assistance of Gabriel (Hibil Ziwa) and other Beings... God has no father, no mother, no son, no brother. He is the First and the Last, because He is the Eternal One – the Pure Radiance and the Great Infinite Light. For the Sabian Mandaeans, God/Hiia [Hayyi] is the Creator of the Worlds of Light and the One who oversees every other aspect of creation. Although He is not the literal creator of the earthly world, He, nevertheless, is directly involved in the process of its salvation. When the world was created, it was not perfect as it was not created by the First Perfect Being (Hiia) [Hayyi]. Therefore, God (Hiia) [Hayyi] was moved by His compassion for life to inject Light, Life and Ethereal Water into the world in order for the earthly beings to gain redemption.

== In prayers ==
Many Mandaean texts and prayers begin with the opening phrase b-šumaihun ḏ-hiia rbia (Classical Mandaic: ࡁࡔࡅࡌࡀࡉࡄࡅࡍ ࡖࡄࡉࡉࡀ ࡓࡁࡉࡀ, lit. 'In the name of the Great Life'; Modern Mandaic pronunciation: [bɪʃˈmeihon əd ˈhejji ˈrɑbbi]; Arabic: باسم الحي العظيم, romanized: bism al-Ḥayy al-ʿAẓīm). It is similar to the basmala in Islam and the Christian Trinitarian formula).

== See also ==
- Absolute (philosophy)
- Al-Ḥayy, one of the 99 names of God in Islam
- Ein Sof
- Father of Greatness, Abba d-Rabbuta in Manichaeism
- Mandaean cosmology
- Monad (Gnosticism)
- Names of God
- Tetragrammaton
- Ultimate reality
