= World of Light =

Heavenly realm in Mandaeism

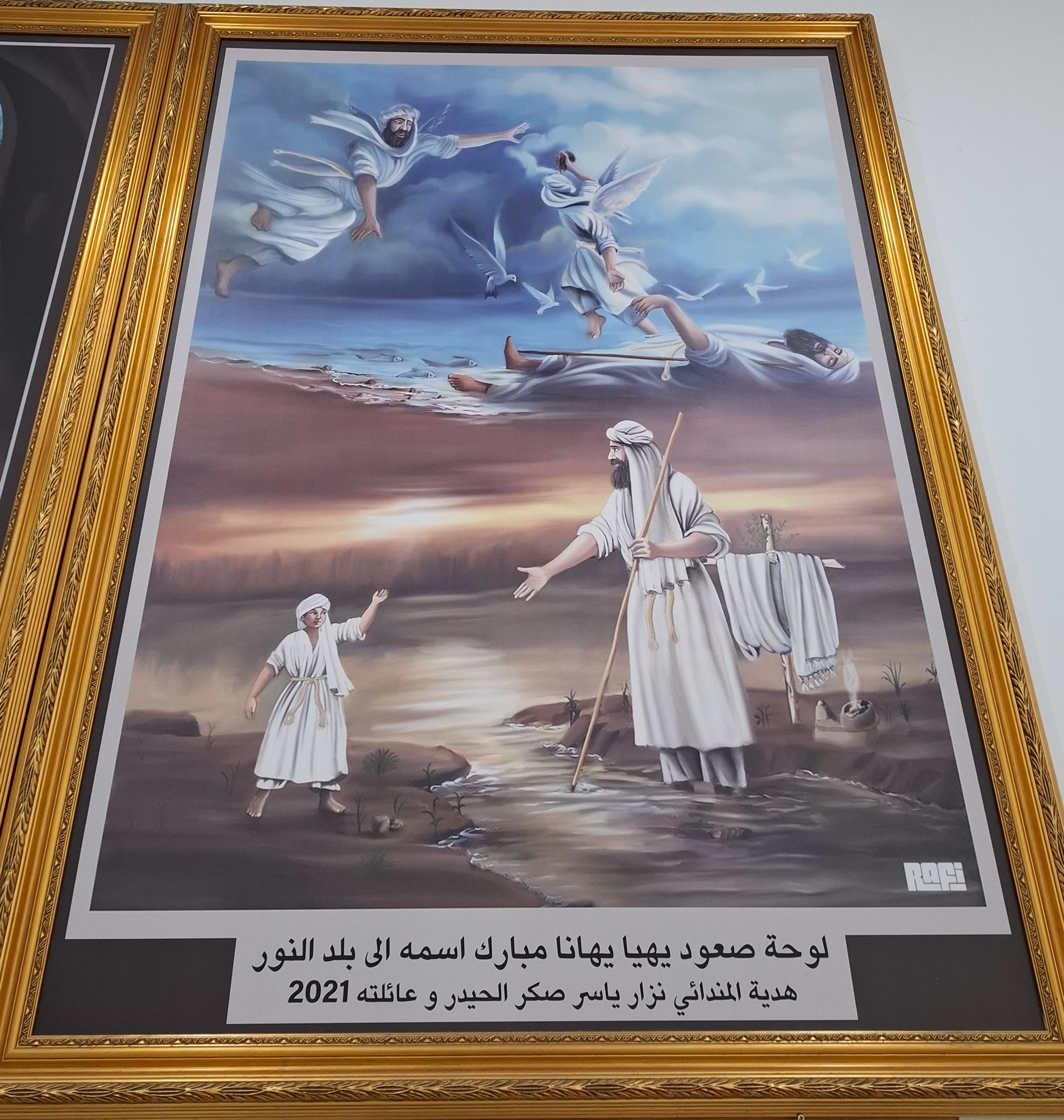
A painting at Yahya Yuhana Mandi depicting the ascension of Yahya Yuhana (John the Baptist) from Tibil to the World of Light during his meeting with Manda d-Hayyi, who appears as a boy at the yardna. The story is from Right Ginza Book 5, Chapter 4.

In Mandaeism, the World of Light or Lightworld (Classical Mandaic: ࡀࡋࡌࡀ ࡖࡍࡄࡅࡓࡀ, romanized: alma ḏ-nhūra), also the Worlds of Light (Classical Mandaic: ࡀࡋࡌࡉࡀ ࡖࡍࡄࡅࡓࡀ, romanized: almia ḏ-nhūra, Modern Mandaic pronunciation: [ˈɑlmi dənˈhura]), is the primeval, transcendental world from which Tibil and the World of Darkness emerged.

== Description ==
- The Great Life (Hayyi Rabbi or Supreme God/Monad) is the ruler of the World of Light.
- Countless uthras dwell in škintas in the World of Light. (A škinta is a celestial dwelling where uthras, or benevolent celestial beings, live in the World of Light.)
- The World of Light is the source of the Great Yardna (Jordan River) of Life, also known as Piriawis.
- Ether/Air (Classical Mandaic: ࡀࡉࡀࡓ, romanized: ayar), which can be thought of as heavenly breath or energy, permeates the World of Light.
- The Mšunia Kušṭa is a part of the World of Light considered to be the dwelling place of heavenly or ideal counterparts (dmuta).
- In some Mandaean texts, Tarwan is a part of the World of Light that is described as a "pure land."
- Water flows from the World of Light to Tibil via hapiqia miia, or cosmic streams of water, also known as Hitpun.

== Ascension ==
When a Mandaean person dies, priests perform elaborate death rituals or death masses called masiqta in order to help guide the soul (nišimta) towards the World of Light. In order to pass from Tibil (Earth) to the World of Light, the soul must go through multiple maṭarta (watch-stations, toll-stations or purgatories; see also Aerial toll house, Arcs of Descent and Ascent, and Araf) before finally being reunited with the dmuta, the soul's heavenly counterpart.

== Parallels ==
The idea has some parallels with the Gnostic concept of pleroma.

== See also ==
- Heaven
- Divine light
- Pleroma in Gnosticism
- Form of the Good in Platonism
- Nūr (Islam)
- Ohr in Jewish mysticism
- Tabor Light
