= Mandaic language =

Language of the Mandaean religion and community

Mandaic
- ࡋࡉࡔࡀࡍࡀ ࡖ ࡌࡀࡍࡃࡀࡉࡉࡀ; Lishāna ’d Mandāyì
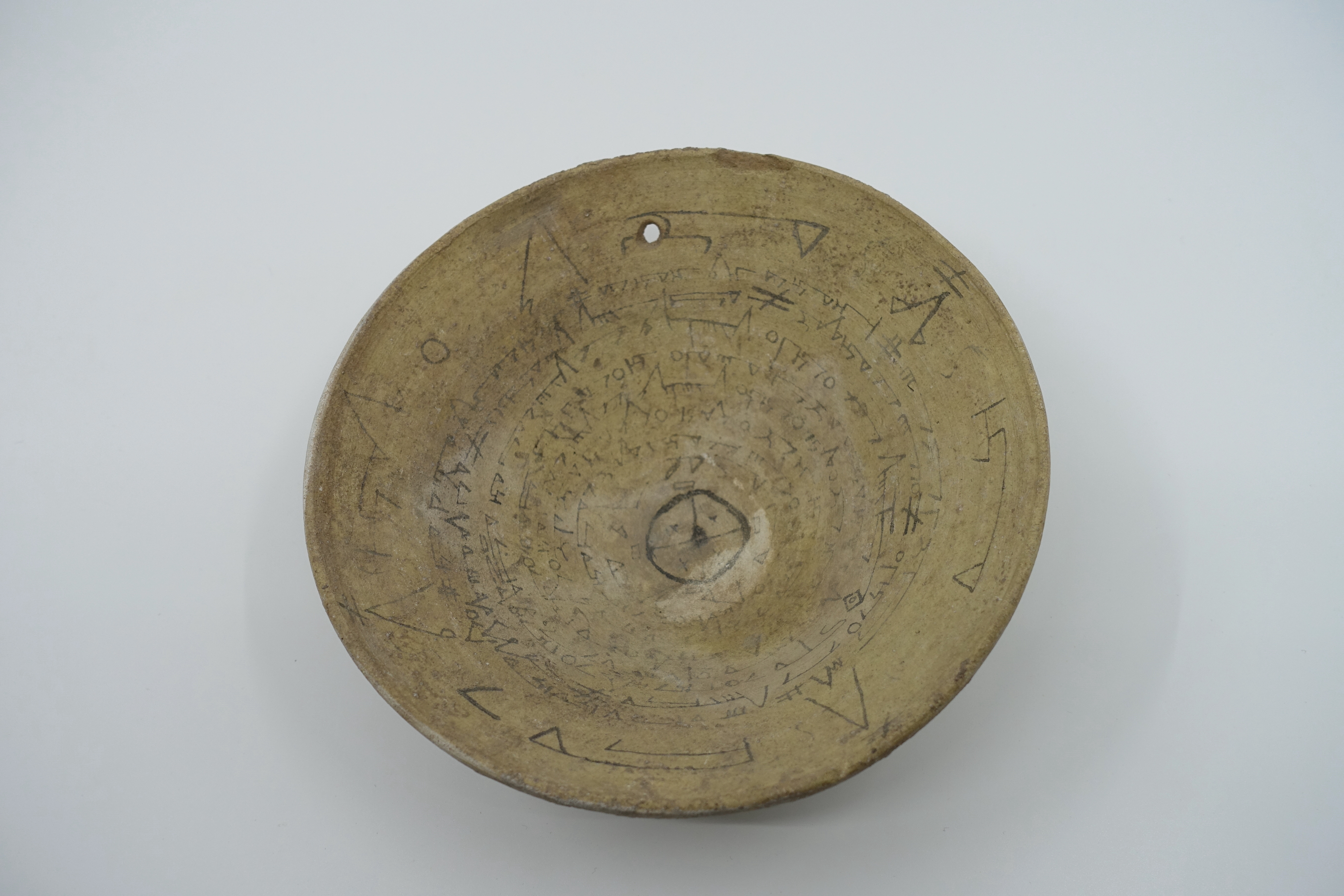
- Incantation bowl from Mesopotamia dated between the 5th and the 8th century, inscribed in Mandaic, in the collection of the Jewish Museum of Switzerland
- Native to: Iraq and Iran
- Region: Iraq: Baghdad, Basra; Iran: Khuzistan
- Ethnicity: Mandaeans
- Native speakers: (5,500 cited 2001)
- Language family: Afro-Asiatic: Semitic; Central Semitic; Northwest Semitic; Aramaic; Eastern; Southeastern; Mandaic
- Early forms: Proto-Afroasiatic: Proto-Semitic; Old Aramaic; Middle Aramaic; Eastern Middle Aramaic
- Writing system: Mandaic alphabet

Language codes
- ISO 639-3: Either: mid – Mandaic myz – Classical Mandaic
- Glottolog: mand1468 nucl1706 clas1253

Mandaic, or more specifically Classical Mandaic, is the liturgical language of Mandaeism and a South Eastern Aramaic variety in use by the Mandaean community, traditionally based in southern parts of Iraq and southwest Iran, for their religious books. Mandaic, or Classical Mandaic, is still used by Mandaean priests in liturgical rites. The modern descendant of Mandaic or Classical Mandaic, known as Neo-Mandaic or Modern Mandaic, is spoken by a small group of Mandaeans around Ahvaz and Khorramshahr in the southern Iranian Khuzestan province.

Liturgical use of Mandaic or Classical Mandaic is found in Iran (particularly the southern portions of the country), in Baghdad, Iraq and in the diaspora (particularly in the United States, Sweden, Australia and Germany). It is an Eastern Aramaic language notable for its abundant use of vowel letters (mater lectionis with aleph, he only in final position, ‘ayin, waw, yud) in writing, so-called plene spelling (Mandaic alphabet) and the amount of Iranian and Akkadian language influence on its lexicon, especially in the area of religious and mystical terminology.

An oral history of the Mandaic language

== Classification ==
Classical Mandaic is a South Eastern Babylonian Aramaic language, belonging to the same Mesopotamian dialect continuum as Babylonian Talmudic Aramaic and Koiné Babylonian Aramaic, and is not to be conflated with Syriac or other North Eastern Aramaic varieties. Its linguistic formation is rooted in the Aramaic of Babylonia from the early Parthian period onward, and its speakers derive from a local Babylonian Aramaean population. The language preserves clear and systematic Mesopotamian features across phonology, morphology, syntax, and lexicon, including extensive inheritance from Akkadian (especially Late Babylonian), which points decisively to an indigenous development within southern Mesopotamia. In contrast, Neo-Mandaic displays minimal Persian influence but is largely limited to later lexical borrowings. There are no demonstrable Western Aramaic influences in the language.

== Usage ==
This southeastern Aramaic dialect is transmitted through religious, liturgical, and esoteric texts, most of them stored today in the Drower Collection, Bodleian Library (Oxford), the Bibliothèque Nationale (Paris), the British Library (London), and in the households of various Mandaeans as religious texts. More specific written objects and of linguistic importance on account of their early transmission (5th–7th centuries CE) are the earthenware incantation bowls and Mandaic lead rolls (amulets) (3rd–7th centuries CE), including silver and gold specimens that were often unearthed in archaeological excavations in the regions of their historical living sites between Wasiṭ and Baṣra, and frequently in central Iraq, for example (Bismaya, Kish, Khouabir, Kutha, Uruk, Nippur), north and south of the confluences of the Euphrates and Tigris (Abu Shudhr, al-Qurnah), and the adjacent province of Khuzistan (Hamadan).

== Historical names ==
In nineteenth-century biblical scholarship, Mandaic was commonly called "Zabian" (abbreviated Zab.), not to be confused with Sabaean (Sabaic), an unrelated South Arabian language. The name derives from one of several Western designations for the community which include Mendæans, Nazareans, Galileans, and Christians of St. John. Keil and Delitzsch, for instance, use the abbreviation "Zab." in their Commentary on the Old Testament (1866) to cite a Zabian (Mandaic) cognate of a Hebrew term alongside its Syriac equivalent. Lexicographer Wilhelm Gesenius mentioned "Zabian or Nazoraean" (i.e. Mandaean) in a lexicographical essay published in 1823, republished in the tenth edition of his lexicon (1886).

== Phonology ==
=== Consonants ===
		Labial	Dental	Alveolar		Palato- alveolar	Palatal	Velar	Uvular	Pharyngeal	Glottal
		Labial	Dental	plain	emphatic	Palato- alveolar	Palatal	Velar	Uvular	Pharyngeal	Glottal
Nasal		m		n							
Stop/ Affricate	voiceless	p		t	tˤ	(t͡ʃ)	k		q		(ʔ)
Stop/ Affricate	voiced	b		d	(dˤ)	(d͡ʒ)	g				
Fricative	voiceless	f	θ	s	sˤ	ʃ		x		(ħ)	h
Fricative	voiced	v	ð	z	(zˤ)	(ʒ)		ɣ		(ʕ)	
Approximant		w		l			j				
Trill				r							

- The glottal stop [ʔ] is said to have disappeared from Mandaic.
- /k/and /ɡ/ are said to be palatal stops, and are generally pronounced as [c] and [ɟ], but are transcribed as /k, ɡ/, however; they may also be pronounced as velar stops [k, ɡ].
- /x/and /ɣ/ are noted as velar, but are generally pronounced as uvular [χ] and [ʁ], however; they may also be pronounced as velar fricatives [x, ɣ].
- Sounds [tʃ, dʒ, ʒ] only occur in Arabic and Persian loanwords.
- Both emphatic voiced sounds [dˤ, zˤ] and pharyngeal sounds [ħ, ʕ] only occur in Arabic loanwords.

=== Vowels ===
	Front	Central	Back
Close	i iː		u uː
Mid	e eː	ə	(o) oː
Mid	e eː	ə	ɔ
Open	æ	a	ɑː

- A short [o] is often replaced by the short /ɔ/ sound.

== Alphabet ==
Mandaic is written in the Mandaic alphabet. It consists of 23 graphemes, with the last being a ligature. Its origin and development is still under debate. Graphemes appearing on incantation bowls and metal amulet rolls differ slightly from the late manuscript signs.

== Lexicography ==
Lexicographers of the Mandaic language include Theodor Nöldeke, Mark Lidzbarski, Ethel S. Drower, Rudolf Macúch, and Matthew Morgenstern.

== Neo-Mandaic ==
Neo-Mandaic represents the latest stage of the phonological and morphological development of Mandaic. Having developed in isolation from one another, most Neo-Aramaic dialects are mutually unintelligible and should therefore be considered separate languages. Determining the relationship between Neo-Aramaic dialects is difficult because of poor knowledge of the dialects themselves and their history.

Although no direct descendants of Jewish Babylonian Aramaic survive today, most of the Neo-Aramaic dialects spoken today belong to the Eastern sub-family of Jewish Babylonian Aramaic and Mandaic, among them Neo-Mandaic that can be described with any certainty as the direct descendant of one of the Aramaic dialects attested in Late Antiquity, probably Mandaic. Neo-Mandaic preserves a Semitic "suffix" conjugation (or perfect) that is lost in other dialects. The phonology of Neo-Mandaic is divergent from other Eastern Neo-Aramaic dialects.

Three dialects of Neo-Mandaic were native to Shushtar, Shah Vali, and Dezful in northern Khuzestan Province, Iran before the 1880s. During that time, Mandeans moved to Ahvaz and Khorramshahr to escape persecution. Khorramshahr had the most Neo-Mandaic speakers until the Iran–Iraq War caused many people to leave Iran. Ahvaz is the only community with a sizeable portion of Neo-Mandaic speakers in Iran as of 1993.

The following table compares a few words in Old Mandaic with three Neo-Mandaic dialects. The Iraq dialect, documented by E. S. Drower, is now extinct.

Meaning	Script	Old Mandaic	Iraq dialect	Ahvaz dialect	Khorramshahr dialect
house	ࡁࡀࡉࡕࡀ	baita	bejθæ	b(ij)eθa/ɔ	bieθɔ
in, ins	ࡁ	b-	gaw; b-	gu	gɔw
work	ࡏࡁࡀࡃࡀ	ebada	wad	wɔd	əwɔdɔ
planet	ࡔࡉࡁࡉࡀࡄࡀ	šibiaha	ʃewjæ	ʃewjɔha	ʃewjɔhɔ
come! (imp.pl)	ࡀࡕࡅࡍ	atun	doθi	d(ij)ɵθi	doθi

== Sample text ==
The following is a sample text in Mandaic of Article 1 of the Universal Declaration of Human Rights.

Mandaic:

ࡊࡅࡋ ࡀࡍࡀࡔࡀ ࡌࡉࡕࡋࡉࡓ ࡔࡀࡅࡉࡀ ࡁࡏࡒࡀࡓࡀ ࡅࡀࡂࡓࡉࡀ࡞ ࡁࡉࡍࡕࡀࡅࡕࡉࡓࡕࡀ ࡏࡕࡄࡉࡁࡋࡅࡍ ࡅࡋࡅࡀࡕ ࡄࡓࡀࡓࡉࡀ ࡈࡀࡁࡅࡕࡀ ࡀࡁࡓࡉࡍ ࡀࡊࡅࡀࡕ ࡖࡍࡉࡄࡅࡍ ࡀࡄࡉࡀ࡞

Transliteration: Kul anaša mitlir šauia b-ʿqara u-agria. Bintautirta ʿthiblun u-luat hraria ṭabuta abrin akuat ḏ-nihun ahia.

English original: "All human beings are born free and equal in dignity and rights. They are endowed with reason and conscience and should act towards one another in a spirit of brotherhood."

== See also ==
- Jewish Babylonian Aramaic
- North Eastern Aramaic
- Akkadian language
- Samaritan Aramaic language
- Western Aramaic languages

== General and cited references ==
- Al-Mubaraki, Brayan Majid (2001). A Mandaean Language Teaching Book. Sydney: Al-Mubaraki. ISBN 0-9585705-9-0.
- Al-Mubaraki, Brayan Majid; Mubaraki, Brayan; Al-Mubaraki, Majid Fandi (2006). A Mandaic Dictionary. Sydney: Mandaic Aramaic. ISBN 1-876888-10-5.
- Burtea, Bogdan (2012). "Mandaic". The Semitic Languages: An International Handbook. Berlin; Boston: Walter de Gruyter. pp. 670–685. ISBN 9783110251586. OCLC 1030912322.
- Ethel S. Drower and Rudolf Macuch (1963). A Mandaic Dictionary. Oxford: Clarendon Press.
- Charles G. Häberl (2009). The Neo-Mandaic Dialect of Khorramshahr. Wiesbaden: Harrassowitz.
- Häberl, Charles G. (2012). "Neo-Mandaic". The Semitic Languages: An International Handbook. Berlin; Boston: Walter de Gruyter. pp. 725–737. ISBN 9783110251586. OCLC 1030912322.
- Kim, Ronald (2008). "Stammbaum or Continuum? The Subgrouping of Modern Aramaic Dialects Reconsidered". Journal of the American Oriental Society. 128 (3): 505–510.
- Rudolf Macuch (1965). Handbook of Classical and Modern Mandaic. Berlin: De Gruyter.
- Rudolf Macuch (1989). Neumandäische Chrestomathie. Wiesbaden: Harrasowitz.
- Macuch, Rudolf (1993). Neumandäische Texte im Dialekt von Ahwaz. Wiesbaden: Harrassowitz. ISBN 3447033827.
- Joseph L. Malone (1997). "Modern and Classical Mandaic Phonology", in Phonologies of Asia and Africa, edited by Alan S. Kaye. Winona Lake, Ind.: Eisenbrauns.
- Müller-Kessler, Christa (2009). "Mandaeans v. Mandaic Language". Encyclopaedia Iranica.
- Theodor Nöldeke (1862). "Ueber die Mundart der Mandäer", Abhandlungen der Historisch-Philologischen Classe der königlichen Gesellschaft der Wissenschaften zu Göttingen 10: 81–160.
- Theodor Nöldeke (1964). Mandäische Grammatik, Halle: Waisenhaus; reprint Darmstadt: Wissenschaftliche Buchgesellschaft with Appendix of annotated handnotes from the hand edition of Theodor Nöldeke by Anton Schall.
- Svend Aage Pallis (1933). Essay on Mandaean Bibliography. London: Humphrey Milford.
- Franz Rosenthal (1939). "Das Mandäische", in Die aramaistische Forschung seit Th. Nöldeke’s Veröffentlichungen. Leiden, Netherlands: Brill, pp. 224–254.
- Rainer M. Voigt (2007). "Mandaic", in Morphologies of Asia and Africa, in Alan S. Kaye, ed., Phonologies of Asia and Africa. Winona Lake, Ind.: Eisenbrauns.
