= Kd azil bhira dakia =

Genre of prayers in Mandaeism

In Mandaeism, kḏ azil bhira dakia (Classical Mandaic: ࡗ ࡀࡆࡉࡋ ࡁࡄࡉࡓࡀ ࡃࡀࡊࡉࡀ, lit. 'when the chosen, pure one went') is a group of 25 Mandaean prayers in the Qulasta. The prayers are commonly recited during Mandaean priest initiation ceremonies, wedding ceremonies, and other religious functions. Three prayers in Book 15 of the Right Ginza also begin with kḏ azil bhira dakia as their opening line.

== Opening line ==
The prayers all begin with the opening line, "When/where the chosen pure one went" (kḏ azil bhira dakia) "to the place where the Perfected Ones dwell" (l-atra ḏ-iatbia tušlimia). Each word of kḏ azil bhira dakia can be translated as follows.

- kḏ 'when' or 'where'
- azil 'went'
- bhira 'chosen (one[s])'
- dakia 'pure (one[s])'

The 'chosen' or 'pure' one refers to a Mandaean priest or Nasoraean as he joins his fellow uthras (i.e., other Mandaean priests, who are considered to be uthras on earth) in the World of Light.

== Refrain ==
Except for prayers 244, 247, 254, and 255, all of the kḏ azil bhira dakia prayers contain the following refrain in the middle.

Mandaic transliteration

ʿu hinialkun rbia
ʿu hinialkun rurbia
ʿu hinialkun rbia

English translation

If it please Thee, Great (Life)
If it please Thee, Mighty (Life)
If it please Thee, Great (Life)

== Published versions ==
In E. S. Drower's Canonical Prayerbook of the Mandaeans (1959) (henceforth abbreviated CP), they are numbered as prayer numbers 205 and 233–256, with prayers 233–256 also duplicated as prayers 261–284. In Drower (1959), prayers 233–256 make up a total of 24 prayers (excluding duplicates); together with prayer 205, they make up a total of 25 prayers. A revised English translation of the prayers can be found in the Qulasta (2025) by Carlos Gelbert and Mark J. Lofts.

The kḏ azil bhira dakia prayers are also duplicated in Part 3 of The Wedding of the Great Shishlam (MS DC 38, published in Drower 1950). Drower (1950) provides a full transliteration and English translation of the entire text.

Part 3 of the Oxford Collection in Mark Lidzbarski's Mandäische Liturgien (1920) contains selected portions of the kḏ azil bhira dakia prayers, which are organized into 19 separate prayers. They correspond to various parts (typically the middle and/or bottom portions) of CP 233–240, 243–246, 250–251, 253, and 255–256 in Drower (1959), but not CP 241–242, 247–249, 252, and 254.

All of the kḏ azil bhira dakia prayers have been published using typesetted Mandaic by Majid Fandi Al-Mubaraki in Ktaba ḏ-Qabin (Book of Marriage), which makes up Part 2 in Volume 2 of Al-Mubaraki's Qulasta set (initially published in 1999 and subsequently revised in 2010).

== Corresponding prayers ==
Corresponding prayers between Lidzbarski (1920) and Drower (1959) are as follows.

Oxford	CP	CP duplicate
2.32	205 (middle part)	–
2.33	205 (bottom part)	–
3.1	233 (bottom part)	261
3.2	234 (bottom part)	262
3.3	235 (bottom part)	263
3.4	236 (bottom part)	264
3.5	237 (middle part)	265
3.6	237 (bottom part)	265
3.7	238 (bottom part)	266
3.8	239 (bottom part)	267
3.9	240 (middle part)	268
3.10	243 (middle part)	271
3.11	244 (middle part)	272
3.12	244 (bottom part)	272
3.13	245 (bottom part)	273
3.14	246 (middle part)	274
3.15	250 (middle part)	278
3.16	251 (middle part)	279
3.17	253 (middle part)	281
3.18	253 (bottom part)	281
3.19	255, 256 (bottom parts)	283, 284

== In the Ginza Rabba ==
In the Right Ginza, hymns 15.15 (i.e., Hymn 15 in Book 15), 15.16, and 15.17 all begin with the phrase kḏ azil bhira dakia, although 15.15 and 15.16 do not have the following phrase "to the place where the Perfected Ones dwell" (l-atra ḏ-iatbia tušlimia). Right Ginza 15.17 is not in Mark Lidzbarski's 1925 German translation of the Ginza Rabba.

== See also ==
- Qulasta
- List of Qulasta prayers
