= Right Ginza =

Mandaean religious text

Information
- Religion: Mandaeism
- Language: Mandaic language

The Right Ginza (Classical Mandaic: ࡂࡉࡍࡆࡀ ࡉࡀࡌࡉࡍࡀ, romanized: Ginza Yamina or Classical Mandaic: ࡂࡉࡍࡆࡀ ࡉࡀࡌࡉࡍ, romanized: Ginza Yamin) is one of the two parts of the Ginza Rabba, the longest and the most important holy scripture of Mandaeism. The other part of the Ginza Rabba is the Left Ginza.

Summaries of each book (or tractate), based mostly on Häberl (2007), are provided below. Translated excerpts are from Gelbert (2011), which is mostly based on Lidzbarski (1925), while Mandaic transliterations are derived from Gelbert (2011, 2021).

Opening lines of each chapter are provided below, since Mandaeans often refer to Mandaic prayers by their opening lines.

== Book 1 ==
Book 1 contains a history of creation and of Mandaeism.

The book begins with the opening line (also in Chapter 2 of Book 1):

Praised be Thou, my Lord, with a pure heart (mšabit marai b-liba dakia),
thou Lord of all worlds (maraihun ḏ-kulhun almia).

Gelbert (2011) mentions two versions of the book, namely the Gabriel Version (of Petermann) and the Ptahil Version.

== Book 2 ==
Book 2 also contains a history of creation and of Mandaeism. It has a total of four sections, since it also contains three small appended pieces. These books summarize many of the basic teachings of Mandaeism. Buckley (2010) considers Book 1 and 2 to be different versions of the same book.

- Chapter 2.1 is a chronology of the world containing creation stories and the four epochs of the universe. Titled The Book of the Lord of Greatness (sidra ḏ-mara ḏ-rabuta). 165 paragraphs in Gelbert (2011).
- Chapter 2.2 is a confession of sins. Titled The Book of the Jordan (sidra ḏ-iardna). 65 paragraphs in Gelbert (2011).
- Chapter 2.3 has exhortations from the messenger of light. 65 poetic lines in Gelbert (2011). Opening line:

When I, the envoy of the Life (kḏ ʿtit ana šliha ḏ-hiia).

- Chapter 2.4 contains teachings on marriage. 11 paragraphs in Gelbert (2011). Opening line:

I call you, my plants (naṣbia) whom I have planted, and chosen ones whom I have chosen (ʿakun qarina naṣbia ḏ-ana niṣbit, u-bhiria ḏ-ana bihrit).

== Book 3 ==
Book 3, The Book of the Living First Teachings (sidra ḏ-šuta haita qadmaita) or alternatively Mystery and the First Book of the Living First Speech that Was When There Were No Precedents, is the longest book in the Ginza. It is a reconstructed poem also dealing with creation themes but concentrating more on the origin of evil. Aldihisi (2008) gives an English translation and detailed commentary for Book 3. The full Mandaic title of Book 3 is Raza u-sidra qadmaia ḏ-šuta haita qadmaita ḏ-huat mn laqadmaia ("The Mystery and the First Book of the First Living Doctrine from the Aforetime" (or "the Very Beginning")). 2,700 lines in Gelbert (2011).

The book begins with the opening lines:

When the fruit (was still) in the fruit (kḏ hua pira b-gu pira),
and when the aether (was still) in the aether (u-kḏ hua aiar b-gu aiar),
and when the great Mana of magnificence was existing (u-kḏ hua mana rba ḏ-ʿqara),

from Whom mighty great Manas emerged (ḏ-hun minḥ mania rurbia kabiria),
whose radiance is numerous and whose light is great (ḏ-npiš ziuaihun u-kabir nhuraihun).

== Book 4 ==
Book 4 is a small text connected to the story of Hibil's descent into the World of Darkness. Before descending into the underworld, Hibil, along with Shitil and Anush, are baptized by Manda ḏ-Hayyi and Mara ḏ-Rabuta ("The Lord of Greatness"). Some parts of the book are derived from Qulasta prayers 82 and 180–188 (Drower's CP numbering). Titled The Mystery and the Book and the Commentary of the First Doctrine (raza u-sidra u-aprašata ḏ-šuta qadmaita) in Gelbert (2011). 31 paragraphs in Gelbert (2011).

== Book 5 ==
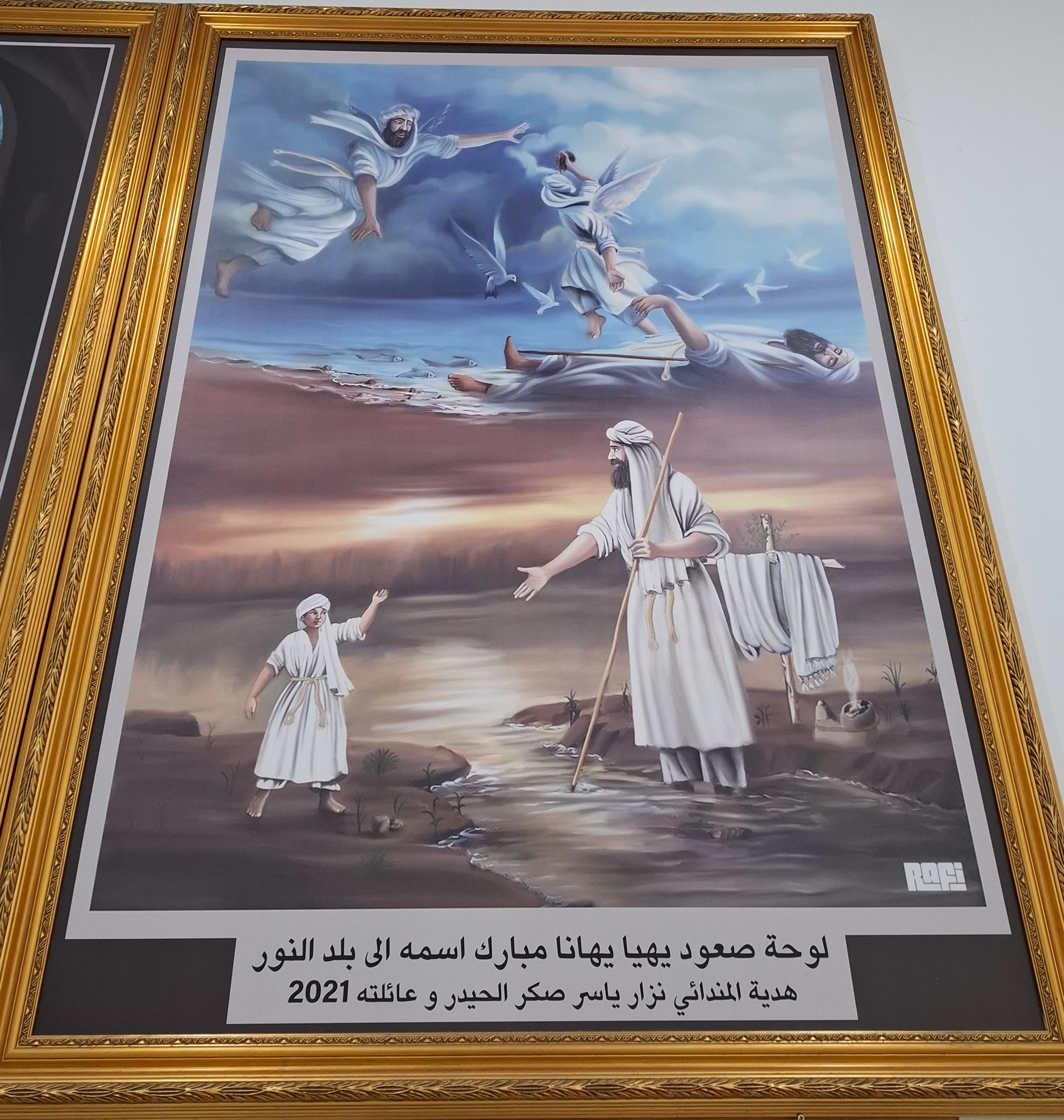
A painting at Yahya Yuhana Mandi depicting the ascension of Yahya Yuhana (John the Baptist) to the World of Light during his meeting with Manda d-Hayyi, who appears as a boy (from Right Ginza 5.4)

Book 5 contains 5 separate prose texts. The first one, which is also the largest, deals with a journey to the Underworld. The Al-Saadi translation treats this as three separate books, leading in book numbering in the Al-Saadi edition diverging from the other editions (Lidzbarski and Gelbert) from this point onward. The 5 sections are:

- Chapter 5.1 (Book 5 in the Al-Saadi edition) covers the savior spirit Hibil Ziwa's descent into the underworld. Titled The Book of the Underworld (sidra ḏ-supat). 206 paragraphs in Gelbert (2011).
- Chapter 5.2 (6.1 in the Al-Saadi edition), The Destruction of the Idols of the House (or The Overthrow of the Gods of the House; Mandaic: qarqalta ḏ-kulḥ alahuta ḏ-baita, in Gelbert's Ginza), details the destruction of the world's idols by Manda ḏ-Hayyi. The chapter also contains references to parts of the Hebrew Bible, such as Psalm 114 and Isaiah 5. 44 paragraphs in Gelbert (2011).
- Chapter 5.3 (6.2 in the Al-Saadi edition) is an account of the masiqta, the journey of the soul to the World of Light as it passes through maṭarta (stations). Titled My Measure in the World is Full (sidra ḏ-kʿlai b-alma šilman). 31 paragraphs in Gelbert (2011).
- Chapter 5.4 (6.3 in the Al-Saadi edition) recounts the story of Manda ḏ-Hayyi's baptism by John the Baptist, and John the Baptist's death and ascension to the World of Light. 42 paragraphs in Gelbert (2011).
- Chapter 5.5 (Book 7 in the Al-Saadi edition), The Mystery and the Book of Šilmai, Lord of the House (raza u-sidra ḏ-šilmai marḥ ḏ-baita), is about Šilmai (or Šalmai), an uthra identified in the chapter as the ruler of the material world and a member of Ruha's entourage. 51 paragraphs in Gelbert (2011). See the article on Shilmai for a summary.

The opening lines of the first four chapters in Book 5 are:

Chapter 1:

For the Life kept the word (ḏ-hiia kisiuia l-malala) of Manda ḏ-Hiia hidden (ḏ-manda ḏ-hiia),
when he revealed a revelation before the Mana and His Likeness and before the Life (kḏ galil galalta qudam mana hu u-dmutḥ),
that an evil spirit (u-qudam hiia ḏ-had diaua/daiua) had appeared from Siniawis ([a]tar mn siniauis), the lower earth of the darkness (arqa titaita ḏ-hšuka).

Chapter 2:

The radiance and the Light of the Life have risen (dna ziua u-nhur hiia),
and Manda ḏ-Hiia has revealed himself (u-ʿtiglia manda ḏ-hiia).

Chapter 3:

My measure in the world was filled (kʿlai b-alma šilman),

and my sum (of years) in the ages is spent (u-hušbanai b-daria ʿtbadr).

I went out of the world of darkness (nipqit mn alma ḏ-hšuka),

and the mixing-bowl of death (u-mn mariba ḏ-muta).

Chapter 4:

These are the words of Yuhana the Baptizer (halin hinun pugdamia ḏ-iuhana maṣbana),

as he took up the river of living waters (kḏ iardna ḏ-mia hiia l-gaṭ),
and baptized with the living baptism (u-maṣbuta haita maṣba),
and mentioned the name of the Life (u-šuma ḏ-hiia madkar).

Manda ḏ-Hiia went to Yuhana the Baptizer and spoke to him (u-asgia manda ḏ-hiia l-uatḥ ḏ-iuhana maṣbana u-amarlḥ):

"Arise Yuhana, baptize me with thy baptism (qum iuhana, ṣban b-maṣbutak),
which thou used to baptize with (ḏ-maṣbit),
and pronounce over me that name that thou used to pronounce (u-adkar ʿlai mn šuma ḏ-madkirit)."

== Book 6 ==
Book 6 (8 in the Al-Saadi edition), The Book of Dinanukt (sidra ḏ-dinanukt [dananukt]) is about Dinanukt, who is half-man and half-book, and his journey to the World of Light. 48 paragraphs in Gelbert (2011).

The book begins with the opening lines:

Between waters and waters I sit (binia mai l-mai iatibna).
I am Dananukt (ana hu dananukt),
the scribe and wise (one) (sapra u-hakima),
the book-in-ink of the gods (spar diuta ḏ-alahia),
the mighty, vainglorious (and) haughty (one) (ʿiutana giutana rbutana ḏ-ʿtlḥ),
who has no lord-of-the-house in his house (l-mara ḏ-baita b-baitḥ).
And there is no one older in the building of his upper palace and in his lower houses (u-laqašiš b-binianḥ b-hiklḥ ʿlaiia u-b-batia titaiia).

== Book 7 ==
Book 7 (9 in the Al-Saadi edition) consists of John the Baptist's words. The chapter is a compilation of proverbs and maxims. 113 paragraphs in Gelbert (2011).

The book begins with the opening lines:

This is the wisdom and the teachings (hazin hukumta u-aprašata)
which Yahya, son of Zakria, explained, revealed, and told to the true and faithful Naṣoraeans (ḏ-apriš u-galil u-amar iahia br zakria l-naṣuraiia kšiṭia u-mhaimnia).
He said (u-amar):
"If thou hast the strength for it, be a chosen righteous (one) (ʿu ʿtbak haila huia bhir zidqa),
who is proven in all his works (= rites) (ḏ-bhir b-klulhun ʿbidata),
like a king, carrying the crown upon his head (akuat malka ḏ-taga triṣlḥ b-rišiḥ).

== Book 8 ==
Book 8 (10 in the Al-Saadi edition) deals briefly with creation and evil, and contains Manda ḏ-Hayyi's warnings against Ruha. 15 paragraphs in Gelbert (2011).

== Book 9 ==
Book 9 has 2 parts. Part 1 deals with other religions and the nature of the Godhead; a smaller part 2 deals with the Holy Unique One.

- Chapter 9.1, The Destruction of the Seven Planets (qarqalta ḏ-šuba kukbia), is a critique of other religions such as Christianity and Islam. It also mentions the Manichaeans, who are called Zandiqia ("Zandiqs", literally 'distorters of Zand') and Mardmania ("followers of Mar Mani"). The tractate also mentions the Zoroastrians, who are called Iazuqaiia ("Yazuqaeans") and are associated with Shamish (an allusion to Mithra). Titled The Overthrow of the Seven (Planets) (qarqalta ḏ-šuba) in Gelbert (2011). 61 paragraphs in Gelbert (2011).
- Chapter 9.2 (Book 11 in the Al-Saadi edition) is about the Great Mana creating a young boy ("only-begotten son") from the heavenly Jordan. Titled The Mystery and Book of the Radiance that is Burning in the Mana (raza u-sidra ḏ-ziua ḏ-iaqid b-gu mana). 21 paragraphs in Gelbert (2011).

== Book 10 ==
Book 10 (12 in the Al-Saadi edition), The Mystery and the Book of the Radiance that Shines Forth from the Pihta (raza u-sidra ḏ-ziua ḏ-iaqid b-gu pihta), deals with the sacrament of the bread (pihta) and also continues the creation story. Within the same book, Hibil and Adakas are mentioned in two different versions of the soul's descent into the physical body of Adam. 66 paragraphs in Gelbert (2011).

The book begins with the opening line:

That first Mana came into being therein (ḏ-hu mana qadmaia huabḥ),
was created therein and dwelt therein (u-ptabḥ u-darbḥ).

== Book 11 ==
Book 11 (13 in the Al-Saadi edition), The Mystery and the Book of the Great Anush (Enosh) (raza u-sidra ḏ-anuš rba), deals with battles between the forces in the World of Light and World of Darkness led by Ruha. Since the text is difficult to interpret, Lidzbarski had originally hesitated to translate it. 145 paragraphs in Gelbert (2011).

The book begins with the opening lines:

A son of the realm of Light am I (br atra ana ḏ-nhura);
I am a son of the eternal abode, which is all uthras (br daura taqna ana ḏ-kulḥ ʿutria),
a son of the city that is all good things (br mdinta ḏ-kulḥ ṭabuta).

== Book 12 ==
Book 12 (14 in the Al-Saadi edition), in seven parts, mixes poetry and prose and provides a basic introduction to Mandaean beliefs. Chapters 2–5 are acrostic hymns, with each stanza ordered according to a letter of the Mandaic alphabet.

- Chapter 12.1 (14.1 in the Al-Saadi edition) is an address by Anush (Enosh). 15 paragraphs in Gelbert (2011).
- Chapter 12.2 (14.2.1 in the Al-Saadi edition) is an acrostic (alphabetical) hymn, corresponding to Prayer 179 in the Qulasta. This hymn is also at the beginning of the Code Sabéen manuscripts 25 and 15. The poem begins with the opening lines:

Come in goodness, kušṭa (ata b-ṭabu kušṭa),
light which goest to the house of thy friends (nhura ḏ-masgia l-bit rahmḥ).

- Chapter 12.3 (14.2.2 in the Al-Saadi edition) is an acrostic hymn. The poem begins with the opening lines:

Dazzling is the dwelling in which the gentle ones live (aiar l-daura ḏ-nʿhil šrabḥ),
and my heart has been chosen among the elect ones (u-libai mn bhiria bhir).

- Chapter 12.4 (14.2.3 in the Al-Saadi edition) is an acrostic hymn that is identical to Prayer 214 in the Qulasta. The poem begins with the opening lines:

The pearl came (atat marganita),
which gave light to the dark hearts (ḏ-anhrat li-lbia haškia).

- Chapter 12.5 (14.2.4 in the Al-Saadi edition) is an acrostic hymn. The poem begins with the opening lines:

Naked did the first deceased (arṭil npaq rišaia)
depart from the world (kilaia minḥ ḏ-alma).

- Chapter 12.6 (14.3 in the Al-Saadi edition) is about the World of Darkness, its king Ur, and its inhabitants. Descriptions of the King of Darkness have parallels in chapters 6 and 27 of the Manichaean Kephalaia. 27 paragraphs in Gelbert (2011). The chapter begins with the opening lines:

I summon you, I teach you and I speak to you, you true and faithful men (ʿlkun qarina u-maprišna u-amarna gubria kšiṭia u-mhaimnia),
you beholders and discerners (hazaiia u-prišaiia):
separate yourselves from the worlds of deficiency (ʿtapraš mn almia ḏ-husrana),
which are full of confusion and error (ḏ-kulḥ šigša u-ṭʿia mlia).

- Chapter 12.7 (14.4 in the Al-Saadi edition) is about the directions (North, etc.) and the cosmic ocean. 16 paragraphs in Gelbert (2011). The chapter begins with the opening line:

This is the explanation and the revelation which was revealed to the distinguished men (haza hʿ aprašta u-galalta ḏ-ʿtgalalun l-gubria prišaiia),
who have sundered themselves from the Tibil and from the works of the deluders (ḏ-priš mn tibil u-mn ʿbidatun ḏ-mašiṭania).

== Book 13 ==
Book 13 (15 in the Al-Saadi edition), The Prayer of the Tarmidia to the Pious, comprises a short interim conclusion to what seems to be the original version of the Ginza. 38 paragraphs in Gelbert (2011).

The book begins with the opening line:

We priests bear this testimony over the Mandaean people (sahduta hazin lagṭinin anin tarmidia ʿl anašia mandaiia)
and over the Mandaean women and over their sons. (u-ʿl ʿnšia mandaiata u-ʿl bnaiun)

== Book 14 ==
Book 14 (16 in the Al-Saadi edition), The Book of the Great Nbaṭ (Sidra ḏ-Nbaṭ Rba), a prose text containing a creation myth, deals with material from Book 3 such as the various emanations. 65 paragraphs in Gelbert (2011).

The book begins with the opening lines:

This is the mystery and the Book of the Great Nbaṭ (hazin hu raza u-sidra ḏ-nbaṭ rba),

who came up from below and shone forth (ḏ-nbaṭ u-anhar),
and blossomed and became great (u-pra u-ʿtraurab).

Uthras sprang up before him (u-nbaṭ ʿutria l-qudamḥ).

== Book 15 ==
Book 15 (17 in the Al-Saadi edition) is a collection of poems. Numbering differs between editions since Lidbarski's text includes 20 poems, Gelbert's includes 21 (with Gelbert's 15.18-21 corresponding to Lidzbarski's 15.17-20) and Al-Saadi's translation covers only nine.

- Chapter 15.1 (17.1 in the Al-Saadi edition): "The Word" (Anush) descends into the material world on behalf of the Great Life to teach the believers.
- Chapter 15.2 (17.2 in the Al-Saadi edition): The Great Life sends Hibil Ziwa to Tarwan. There, he teaches the uthras. Hibil Ziwa also visits Yushamin and Ptahil.
- Chapter 15.3 (17.3 in the Al-Saadi edition) is about the Living Water's lamentations about the material world. Šilmai and Nidbai, the guardian uthras of the Living Water, console him.
- Chapter 15.4 describes the Moon (known as Sin in Mandaic). It is also found in chapter 53 of the Mandaean Book of John, but with minor variations.
- Chapter 15.5: The Great Life sends Sam Ziwa (Shem) to be a guardian for the believers in the material world.
- Chapter 15.6: Yukabar Kušṭa goes to the material world to teach the believers.
- Chapter 15.7 (17.4 in the Al-Saadi edition): The Great Life sends a messenger who is either Manda ḏ-Hayyi or Yawar to the material world to teach the Nasoreans.
- Chapter 15.8 (17.5 in the Al-Saadi edition) is about the messenger Yawar.
- Chapter 15.9 is about the soul's lamentation upon being sent into a material body.
- Chapter 15.10 (17.6 in the Al-Saadi edition) is about the creation of the uthras by the Great Mana (Mana Rabba).
- Chapter 15.11 consists of a story about Anush's battle with Ruha. Jerusalem is built and settled by the Jews. Anush gains many followers in Jerusalem, but they are killed. Anush then destroys Jerusalem.
- Chapter 15.12: The Great Life sends an uthra to the material world to teach the believers.
- Chapter 15.13 (17.7 in the Al-Saadi edition), the "Hymn of Ptahil", is a creation story similar to Book 3.
- Chapter 15.14, the "Hymn of the Priests Questioning the Uthra from the Great Life": The Great Life sends an uthra to the material world to teach the believers. Namrus (Ruha) tries to tempt the uthra without success.
- Chapter 15.15 consists of Ptahil's lamentation and his threat of starting a war. One of the two niana poems in Book 15 with the refrain "when the chosen pure one went away" (kḏ azil bhira dakia ࡗ ࡀࡆࡉࡋ ࡁࡄࡉࡓࡀ ࡃࡀࡊࡉࡀ).
- Chapter 15.16 covers Manda ḏ-Hayyi's debate with Yushamin. Afterwards, Manda ḏ-Hayyi sends Hibil Ziwa to visit Ptahil, then Abatur, and then Yushamin, after which Hibil Ziwa finally returns to the heavens. One of the two niana poems in Book 15 with the refrain "when the chosen pure one went away" (kḏ azil bhira dakia ࡗ ࡀࡆࡉࡋ ࡁࡄࡉࡓࡀ ࡃࡀࡊࡉࡀ). After this chapter, Gelbert (2011) has another chapter numbered 17 that is not in Lidzbarski's text.
- Chapter 15.17 is a poem about the descent of Manda ḏ-Hayyi into the world and his subsequent battle with Ruha and her entourage. The poem also advises against asceticism.
- Chapter 15.18 (17.8 in the Al-Saadi edition) is an admonition that is also found in chapter 44 (Lidzbarski p. 170) of the Mandaean Book of John.
- Chapter 15.19 (17.9 in the Al-Saadi edition) is a song about the descent of the soul that is also found in chapter 46 (Lidzbarski p. 172) of the Mandaean Book of John.
- Chapter 15.20 is a brief creation story.

Since Mandaean priestly commentary texts often refer to hymns and prayers by their opening lines, the opening lines of each of the 21 poems (since the Gelbert Ginza has 21, rather than 20 poems) in Book 15 are provided below. The English translations below are from Gelbert (2011), while the Mandaic transliterations are derived from Gelbert (2011, 2021).

1. I am a word, a son of words (mimria ana br mimria)
2. I am a peaceful Gupna (grapevine), I who was planted out (gupna ana niha, ḏ-mn ʿqar giua ʿtniṣbit)
3. At the beginning of the formation of the living waters (ʿl riš kimṣa ḏ-mia hiia)
4. When the gleaming was planted from its place (asgia atalḥ l-alma)
5. The call it is of the pure Sam-Ziwa (qala ḏ-sam ziua dakia), whom the Great (Life) called into being from out of His mouth (ḏ-rbia mn qumaihun qruia).
6. I am Yokabar-Kušṭa, I who went away from the house of my father and came (here) (ana hu iukabar kušṭa, ḏ-asgit mn bit ab atib).
7. From the dwelling of the Mighty (Life) the Great (Life) called me, and gave me orders and confirmed me (mn škinat kabiria rbia qrun, u-paqdun u-qaimun).
8. With the power of radiance and of the sindirka, they created the yawar and appointed him over everything (b-haila ziua u-sindirka, l-iauar qrulḥ u-paqduia ʿl kul ṣbu).
9. I am the perfume of the uthras (busma ana ḏ-ʿutria), I who went away and found a dwelling in the true hearts (ḏ-asgit šrit bilbab kšiṭ).
10. I am speaking with My Likeness (mn dmutai mištaiina): "Come, I and Thou will form (create) (ḏ-atai nibun ana u-lik)."
11. When I, Anuš-ʿuthra, came (kḏ atit ana anuš ʿutra) into this world (l-gaua ḏ-hazin alma)
12. At the head of the pure wreath (ʿl riš klila dakia ḏ-šadar rbia), which the Great (Life) sent, He created a calm uthra (l-ʿutria niha qiriuia).
13. When I, Ptahil, was formed and came into being, I came into being from the exalted well-spring of radiance. (kḏ ʿšṭar arit u-huit ana ptahil, mn aina ḏ-ziua sagia huit)
14. The priests question the man (tarmidia mšaililḥ l-gabra) who has come from the Great (Life) (ḏ-mn rbia ata).
15. When the chosen pure one went away (kḏ azil bhira dakia), the Life created me from Himself (hiia mn binun qrun).
16. When the chosen pure one went away (kḏ azil bhira dakia), the Life created me from the heights (hiia mn mruma qrun).
17. When the chosen pure one went (kḏ azil bhira dakia) into the pure place, where the perfect ones dwell (l-atra ḏ-iatbia tušlimia) (not in Lidzbarki's text)
18. I was planted and came up into this world (minṣab nṣiba u-atina b-gaua ḏ-hazin alma). (= 15.17 in Lidzbarski)
19. The majestic voice of the Life is calling, The majestic voice of the Mighty Life (kaluza ḏ-hiia qaria, kaluza ḏ-hiia rurbia). (= 15.18 in Lidzbarski)
20. From the realm of Light have I come (mn atra ḏ-nhura nipqit), out of thee, eternal abode (minak daura taqna). (= 15.19 in Lidzbarski)
21. Who is it who comes (man ḏ-nitia), and who is it who speaks to me (u-man ḏ-nimarlia)? (= 15.20 in Lidzbarski)

== Book 16 ==
Book 16 contains 10 or 11 mostly shorter poems, depending on the manuscript version, of which Al-Saadi's translation covers four. Many are comparatively simple and straightforward.

- Chapter 16.1 is similar to Chapter 15.2, in which Manda ḏ-Hayyi visits the world of Yushamin, the Second Life.
- Chapter 16.2 consists of an uthra's admonitions for Adam. The first part of this chapter is also found in the Mandaean Book of John.
- Chapter 16.3 consists of Manda ḏ-Hayyi's admonitions for his friends.
- Chapter 16.4 contains the messenger of light's announcement to the faithful.
- Chapter 16.5 (18.1 in the Al-Saadi edition) is about the masiqta (ascent of the soul to the World of Light) with the help of gifts from Truth (Kušṭa).
- Chapter 16.6 teaches that only pious works, not earthy possessions, leads to grace.
- Chapter 16.7 (18.2 in the Al-Saadi edition) is an uthra's lamentation about the soul's imprisonment in the material body.
- Chapter 16.8 is about the wicked's unsuccessful attempt to trick the descended savior into becoming disloyal.
- Chapter 16.9 (18.3 in the Al-Saadi edition) is a prayer to Kushta (Truth) for help in Tibil and during the masiqta. It is also identical to chapter 48 (Lidzbarski p. 178) of the Mandaean Book of John.
- Chapter 16.10 is about the Great Life granting prayers for help to survive in Tibil and during the masiqta.
- Chapter 16.11 (18.4 in the Al-Saadi edition) consists of Manda ḏ-Hayyi's warnings to his chosen people, who do not want listen to it. It not present in the Parisian manuscripts, the Mhatam Yuhana (MHT) manuscript, and Petermann's version, but is included in the Leiden codex (which Lidzbarski's Ginza is primarily based on) and Mubaraki (MUB) version (see Ginza Rabba § Manuscript versions).

The opening lines of each of the 11 poems in Book 16 are provided below. The English translations below are from Gelbert (2011), while the Mandaic transliterations are derived from Gelbert (2011, 2021).

1. I am the guardian of the pure Tarwan (naṭra ana ḏ-taruan dakita), the son of the great Nbaṭ am I (bra ḏ-nbaṭ rba ana).
2. An uthra calls from outside (ʿutra mn l-bar qaria), and instructs Adam, the first man (u-l-adam gabra qadmaia maprišlḥ).
3. The voice of Manda ḏ-Hiia it is (qala ḏ-manda ḏ-hiia), who is calling and teaching all his friends (ḏ-qaria u-mapriš ʿl-kulhun rahmḥ).
4. From the realm of Light I went forth (mn atra ḏ-nhura), out of thee, thou eternal abode (nipqit minak daura taqna).
5. From the day on which I grew fond of the Life (mn iuma ḏ-rihmit hiia), and from the day on which my heart has loved the kušṭa (u-mn iuma ḏ-libai kušṭa rhim) ... I no longer have confidence in the world (ruhṣana b-alma litlia).
6. The chosen one is preaching from the other world (bhira mn l-hil dariš u-l-bnḥ ḏ-adam maprišlun) and instructs the sons of Adam (maprišlun l-bnḥ ḏ-adam l-halin tmimia ḏ-mindam laʿdun).
7. At the door of the house of the Life (ʿl baba ḏ-bit hiia), the uthra(s) worshipped and sat down and taught (sgid ʿutria u-ʿtib u-draš u-amar).
8. Who, whose son is this (hazin man br manu), he who is so fair by nature (ḏ-haizin šapiria znḥ)?
9. Kušṭa, I testify to thee (kušṭa bak sahidna), as a man who is seeking discernment (kḏ gabra ḏ-baiia binta).
10. Of all the voices which I have heard, thy voice answered me, thou son of the Mighty (Life) (mn kulhun qalia ḏ-šamit, ʿniak qala br rurbia).
11. It is the call of Manda ḏ-Hiia, who is standing on the borders of the world.

== Book 17 ==
Book 17 contains 2 poems. The Al-Saadi translation does not cover this book.

- Chapter 17.1 is about the Great Mana (Mana Rabba Kabira) and his teachings. It also describes the Great First Mana and the Great Occult Eggs that existed before Mar ḏ-Rabuta (The Great Lord) came into being. The chapter begins with the opening line:

Yonder, yonder I am standing here (mn l-hil l-hil qaiimna).

- Chapter 17.2 contains a poem with wisdom instructions from a "being" of the Great Life. It also elaborates on how the seven planets and the twelve constellations of Ruha oppress the nišmata (souls). The chapter begins with the opening line:

The Being of Life came (ata ʿtia ḏ-hiia),
and erected for us the lamp of the Life (traṣlan ḏ-hiia pasimka).

== Book 18 ==
Book 18 contains a chronology of the world plus an apocalypse. It gives a duration of 480,000 years to the world. Abraham, Noah, and Jesus are mentioned in the book. It also contains lists of Pishdadian, Kayanian, Parthian, and Sasanian kings and mentions the Arab conquest of Persia. (The Al-Saadi edition includes only the deluge account, which it numbers 19.) 123 paragraphs in Gelbert (2011).

Also known as the Book of Kings, it has been translated at least seven times. The Book of Kings was translated into a modern European language when Schulim Ochser published a German translation in 1906. A critical edition was published by Häberl (2022).

Book 18 is attributed to the Mandaean scribe Yahya Sam bar Sarwan. The book can be thematically divided into four parts:

1. The "Mandaic targum" paraphrases Genesis 1:6-30, Genesis 6:13–8:14, and Exodus 12-15. Häberl (2022) calls it the "Mandaic targum" due to some similarities with the Aramaic targum.
2. Iranian king lists, which have similarities with the Zoroastrian texts Bundahishn (chapter 36) and Ayadgar i Jamaspig (chapter 4). The kings lists include the legendary Pishdadian and Kayanian kings, as well as the historical Parthian and Sasanian kings.
3. "The Chronicle" covers historical events from 271 to 528 CE. One section focuses on the years 467-481 CE during the reign of Peroz I, while the following section focuses on the years 485-536 CE.
4. "The Apocalypse" has sections covering 531-602 CE and 602-628 CE, respectively, and also describes how the world will end.

The list of Iranian kings given in the Book of Kings is as follows. Note that since Mandaic spellings can vary by manuscript, the transcriptions used below are often reconstructions by Häberl (2022).

| King | Mandaic spelling | Years of reign | Notes |
|---|---|---|---|
| Kaymarodan Gaymurat | Qimarudan Gaimuraṭ | 900 | < Avestan gaiia marətan 'mortal life' |
| Jamshid, son of Tahmurat | Zamdšiṭa br Ṭahmuraṭ | 600 | |
| Azidahāg | Zihnag | 750 | |
| (no king) | | 100 | |
| Asdahāg Bēwarāsp | br Aspag | 300 | slayed by Bahrān |
| Paridon Thebiān | Paridun Tibian | 560 | |
| Pād-Sām Narimān | Pa(t)šm Nariman | 500 | 'the binder of Karkum'; variously identified as Garshasp, Sām, and Nariman |
| Parsāyā of Turak | Parsaia ḏ-Ṭuraq | 60 | |
| Kaykābas | Qaiqubas/Qaiqabas/Kaiqubad < Qaiqabad | 503 | |
| Khaykhasraw, son of Siyāwarshan | Kaikasrau br Seiauišan | 60 | |
| Ugab, son of Burzen | Egab | 300 | |
| Lohrāsp | | 365 | |
| Goshtāsp, son of Lohrāsp | Gušṭasp | 14 | |
| Ardshir, son of Espendyār | Ardšir br Aspindiar | 112 | |
| Khumāy Scheherazade (King Semiramis) | Kumai Ṭašhurizdan (Šamidai) | 80 | |
| Ashgān | | 470 | |
| Jamshid (Solomon), son of David | Dašmšir | 900 | 1,000 years total: 900 on earth, 100 in heaven |
| Alexander the Roman | (Alak)sandar Ruhmaia | 14 | |
| Ashak, son of Ashkān | | 465 | |
| Ardabān | Ardaban | 14 | |

Afterwards, the Persian Sasanian kings are listed:

| King | Mandaic spelling | Father of king | Years of reign |
|---|---|---|---|
| Ardshir Pābogān | Pabugan | | 14 |
| Shābur I | Šabur | Ardshir I | 62 |
| (Balāsh) Hormezd I | Hurmig < Hurmiṣ | Shābur I | 50 |
| Bahrān I | Bahran | Shābur I | 12 |
| Yazdiger I | Iazdigir | Bahrān IV | 12 |
| Shābur IV | Šabur | Yazdiger I | 20 |
| Piroz I | Piruz | Yazdiger II | 40 |
| Behdād | Bihdad | | 3 |
| Kawād I | Qabad | Piroz I | 41 |
| Khasraw I | Kasrau | Kawād I | 48 |
| Hormezd IV | Hurmig < Hurmiṣ | Khasraw I | 12 |
| Khasraw II | Kasrau | Hormezd IV | 38 |
| Sheryu (Kawād II) | Širiu | | |

== Colophons ==
There are 7 colophons in the Ginza Rabba, including 6 in the Right Ginza. There are colophons after books 13 (for books 1–13), 14, 15, 16, 17, and 18, suggesting that these had all originally been separate books before they were compiled into a single codex. Some colophons are also followed by tarik (postscripts).

== Qulasta parallels ==
A few marriage hymns (hadaiata) in Drower's 1959 Canonical Prayerbook of the Mandaeans (CP) correspond to some hymns in Book 12 of the Right Ginza (GR 12):

- CP 179 = GR 12.2
- CP 214 = GR 12.4

== Commandments ==
Book 1 (GR 1) and Book 2, Part 1 (GR 2.1) of the Right Ginza each list several dozen commandments for Mandaeans to follow. Most commandments in GR 2.1 correspond with the commandments listed in GR 1, often with only minor wording differences. GR 1 has more commandments than GR 2.1. There are also some parallels with passages in the Mandaean Book of John.

Notes on section numbering:

- Right Ginza 1: Section numbers are numbered starting from section 3 in Gelbert (2011), since the first 2 sections comprise a scribal prelude. As a result, section 89 in the table below would be equivalent to section 91 in Gelbert (2011).
- Right Ginza 2.1: Section numbers are numbered starting from section 2 in Gelbert (2011), since the first section comprises a scribal prelude. As a result, section 25 in the table below would be equivalent to section 26 in Gelbert (2011).
- Right Ginza 2.4: Original section numbering from Gelbert (2011).
- Mandaean Book of John (MJ): Original chapter and section numbering from Gelbert (2017). Chapter numbers are followed by section numbers. For example, MJ 47.4 is an abbreviation for Chapter 47, Section 4 of the Mandaean Book of John.

The summaries are based on the English translation in Gelbert (2011).

| GR 1 | GR 2.1 | Others | Summary of commandment |
|---|---|---|---|
| 89 | 25 | | Pray 3 times during the day and 2 times at night. |
| 90 | 26 | | Marry and establish a family. |
| 91 | 27 | | Wash with water and purify yourself before approaching your wives. |
| 92 | 28 | GR 2.4.2 | Do not fornicate, steal, or kill human beings. |
| 93 | 29 | | Do not lie or love material possessions (gold and silver). |
| 94 | 30 | MJ 47.11 | Do not worship Satan, idols, or images. |
| 95 | 31 | MJ 47.5 | Do not practice the witchcraft of Satan or bear false witness. |
| 96 | 32 | MJ 47.7 | Do not let the strong or evil take advantage of the weak or diligent. |
| 97 | 34 | | Honor your father, mother, and elder brothers. |
| | 35 | MJ 47.9 | Do not worship Satan, be a spy (give winks), listen to evil things, or be envious. |
| 98 | 36 | | Do not become envious of anything that does not belong to you. |
| 99 | 37 | | Remain firm in your faith even during times of misfortune. |
| 100 | 38 | | Do not befriend idolaters. |
| 101 | 42, 43 | | Free prisoners and redeem their souls through words of truth (kushta) and faith. |
| 102 | 33 | | Give alms (zidqa) to the poor and be a guide to the blind. |
| | 40 | | Those who give alms and then deny alms afterwards will be punished. |
| 103 | 41 | | Feed the hungry, give water to the thirsty, and give clothes to the naked. |
| 104 | | | Seek instruction and proclaim the words of Hayyi. |
| 105 | | | Do not be seduced by the evil ones. |
| 106 | 44 | | Martyrs (those who submit their bodies to murder) are pure. |
| 107 | 73 | | Spiritual fasting: Fast the Great Fast (ṣuma rba), which is not eating or drinking of this world. |
| | 74 | | Fasting with head in faith |
| 108 | 75 | | Fasting with eyes by not seeing and doing with evil intent |
| 109 | 77 | | Fasting with ears from eavesdropping and evil talk |
| 110 | 76 | | Fasting with mouths from lying |
| 111 | 78 | | Fasting with hearts from evil thoughts |
| 112 | 80 | | Fasting with hands from murder and theft |
| 113 | 79 | | Fasting with body from married women |
| 114 | 82 | | Fasting with knees from not kneeling before idols |
| 115 | | | Fasting with feet by not pursuing anything that does not belong to you |
| 116 | 84 | | Fast the Great Fast for your entire life. |
| | 81 | | Do not practice black magic with your hands. |
| | 83 | | Put your trust in the Lord, in correct wisdom, Kushta, faith, and the Lord's commandments. |
| 117 | 39 | | Childhood sins will be forgiven upon genuine repentance if the sins will not be committed anymore. |
| 118 | 45 | | Do not murder for the sake of gold, silver, and possessions. |
| 119 | 86 | | Do not put your trust in kings, rulers, rebellious men, militaries, weapons, wars, troops, prisoners, gold, or silver. |
| 120 | 46 | | Always mention and praise the name of the High King of Light during your daily activities. |
| 121 | 47 | | Participate in the masbuta, bless and eat the pihta, and praise and drink the mambuha. |
| 122 | | | Receive the rushuma (signing). |
| 123 | 56 | | Do not eat animal blood, animals that have already died beforehand and were not slaughtered, pregnant or birthing animals, animals breathing their last, or animals attacked by other animals. Animals must be ritually slaughtered with a knife, and the meat must be properly washed and cooked. |
| 124 | | | Do not eat or drink from the "house of twelve gates" (i.e., pagans). |
| 125 | | | Do not take a wife from the "house of twelve gates" (i.e., pagan wife). |
| 126 | | | Love and support one another. |
| 127 | | | Those who carry out the commandments will be blessed in the realm of Light. |
| 128 | 98 | | Those who do not carry out the commandments will sink down into the darkness. |
| 129 | | | Blessed are the believers, and woe to those who do not listen. |
| 130 | | | Stay away from the rebels of the world. |
| 131 | | | Do not be arrogant when wrong, and do not be foolish about gold and silver. |
| 132 | 48 | | Do not weep over the dead. |
| 133 | | | For as long as you live in this world, your sins will continue to multiply. |
| 134 | 49 | | Do not mourn with sadness, but instead recite prayers and perform the masiqta for them. |
| 135 | | | Teach people words and praise from the realm of Light. |
| 136 | | | Give food to the poor and persecuted. |
| 137 | 50 | | Pay workers' wages on time. |
| 138 | 51 | | Do not rob and betray friends. |
| 139 | 52 | | Keep promises (oaths). |
| 140 | 53 | | Be humble and love each other. |
| 141 | 54 | | Do not consult fortunetellers. |
| 142 | 55 | | Do not make false promises (oaths) or break them. |
| 143 | 57 | MJ 47.10 | Do not take interest or compound interest. |
| 144 | 58 | | Do not lust, fornicate, sing, or dance. |
| 145 | 59 | MJ 50.16 | Support each other during times of persection. |
| 146 | 60 | | If angry, calm down and turn to the Lord. |
| | 61 | | Be grateful to those who are good to you. |
| 147 | 62 | | Befriend wise people and stay away from evil people. |
| | 63 | | Be moderate in your actions except for prayer, praise, worship, paying wages, alms, goodness, and love. |
| 148 | 64 | MJ 47.13 | Golden Rule: Do not to your neighbors what you would not have done to you. |
| 149 | 85 | | Perform good deeds and give yourself provisions for your (spiritual) journey. |
| 150 | 65 | | Follow the will of the Lord, not of Satan, with your eyes, mouth, ears, heart, and hands (with zidqa). |
| 151 | 66 | | Do not be concerned with temporary bodily beauty, but instead worship the Lord. |
| 152 | 67 | | Do not worship Satan and the deceitful images of the world. |
| 153 | | | Do not put your trust the world, but rather put your trust in good deeds. |
| 154 | 87 | | Do not despise the commandments. Show justice, peace, humility, forgiveness, compassion, conciliation, mercy, and love. |
| | 88 | | Do not withhold something from a friend in need who asks for it, when you are able to do so. |
| | 89 | | Offer housing, food, and water for travelers. |
| 155 | | MJ 47.4 | Have children and do not commit adultery. |
| 156 | 92, 93 | MJ 47.8 | Do not marry slave girls who are not yet free. Set her free first and then marry her. Do not put your children into another master's house. |
| 157 | 94 | | Couples should be loyal to each other and not deceive each other. |
| 158 | 95 | | Teach children well. |
| 159 | 96 | | Support people who go astray (from the commandments or religion), even for the second and third times. |
| 160 | 97 | | Do not despise physically disabled people. |
| 161 | | | Do not worship the Seven (Planets) and Twelve (Zodiac). |
| | 100 | | Do not worship the angels, since their radiance was given to them (by the Lord). |
| 162 | | | Do not worship the sun and moon. |
| 163, 164 | 101 | | Do not worship Shamish (the sun) or Adunai. |
| 165 | | | Do not become one of those who fornicate. |
| 172 | 110 | GR 2.4.3 | Do not pay attention to the words of the false prophets. |
| 173 | 111 | | Dress in white clothing, including the turban (burzinqa), girdle (himiana), and staff (margna). |
| 174 | 112 | | Do not say what you do not know and what is not revealed to you. |
| 175 | 113 | | Pacifism: Do not arm yourself with any physical metal weapon. Your only weapon should be Nașoraeism and the true faith/words of the realm of Light. |
| 176 | | | Give wise advice to each other and perform good deeds. |
| | 68 | | Act according to the will of the Lord. |
| | 69 | | Do not oppress the disadvantaged. |
| | 70 | MJ 47.6 | Do not change boundary lines and stones. |
| | 71 | | Give honest criticism to friends and be a true friend. Flatterers will be punished. |
| | 72 | | Receive the great seal (hatma rba) and keep it on your body for your entire life. |
| | 90 | | Teach those are not yet wise. |
| | 91 | | Men and women should marry good people only. |
| | 114 | | Act according to the commandments with your eyes, mouth, and ears. |

== See also ==
- Ginza Rabba
- Left Ginza
