= Yazuqaeans =

Religious group mentioned in Mandaean texts

The Yazuqaeans (Classical Mandaic: ࡉࡀࡆࡅࡒࡀࡉࡉࡀ, romanized: Iazuqaiia) are a religious group mentioned by the Mandaeans in the Ginza Rabba, the central religious text of Mandaeism.

The Yazuqaeans are mentioned in Books 3 and 9.1 of the Right Ginza.

== Identity ==
Shapira (2004) identifies the Yazuqaeans with the Zoroastrians of the Sasanian Empire. The Yazuqaeans are typically described as "fire worshippers" in the Ginza Rabba (see also Atar). They are also associated with Shamish, an allusion to Mithra. However, some passages ascribe Christian characteristics to them, while other passages mention the Jews as having originated from the Yazuqaeans. Shapira suggests that the Mandaeans later associated the Yazuqaeans with the Christians when Zoroastrian influence began to decline.

== Etymology ==
Shapira (2004) proposes an Iranian etymology for the term, suggesting:

- *Iazwaqaiia (*yaz-wak) 'speech of worship'
- *Iazdwaqaiia (*yazd-wak) 'speech of god[s]'. Possible variants: *Iazdqaiia < *yazd[a]k 'belonging to god' or *Iazzodaiia (*yaz[d]-zad) 'born of god[s]', etc.)

== See also ==
- Kentaeans
- Magi, mentioned in Right Ginza Book 18 as magušaia
