= The Wedding of the Great Shishlam =

Mandaean text

The Wedding of the Great Šišlam Šarḥ ḏ-qabin ḏ-Šišlam Rabbā

Information
- Religion: Mandaeism
- Language: Mandaic language

The Wedding of the Great Shishlam (Classical Mandaic: ࡔࡀࡓࡇ ࡖࡒࡀࡁࡉࡍ ࡖࡔࡉࡔࡋࡀࡌ ࡓࡁࡀ Šarḥ ḏ-qabin ḏ-Šišlam Rba) is a Mandaean text. As a liturgical rather than esoteric text, it contains instructions and hymns for the Mandaean marriage ceremony. Traditionally, Mandaean priests recite the entire book at marriage ceremonies. The hymns in the text often contain the refrain "When the proven, the Pure One Went." Unlike most other Mandaean ritual scrolls, The Wedding of the Great Šišlam is not illustrated.

== Manuscripts and translations ==
Copies of the text include Manuscript 38 of the Drower Collection (DC 38), currently held at the Bodleian Library. A full transliteration, English translation, and commentary were published as a book by E. S. Drower in 1950.

Manuscripts held at the Bibliothèque nationale de France include:

- Code Sabéen 15 (Mark Lidzbarski's F manuscript) (partial copy)
- Code Sabéen 25 (Mark Lidzbarski's E manuscript) (partial copy)

== Contents ==
The DC 38 manuscript has five parts. However, since Part 5 is a duplicate of Part 1, there are only four unique parts.

- Part 1 (about 240 lines): instructions on how to perform each step of the Mandaean wedding ceremony, with ritual and Qulasta prayer sequences
- Part 2 (about 110 lines): Qulasta prayers 179–199
- Part 3 (about 1,320 lines): Qulasta prayers 200–256 (including the kḏ azil bhira dakia prayers from 233–256)
- Part 4 (just over 170 lines): titled "The weekly forecast of hourly fortune" (Šabania Šaia), an astrological treatise dealing with the planets and times of the day and week

Part 2 has 16 hymns, and Part 3 has 55 hymns. They are not numbered in Drower (1950).

== Prayers ==
The qabin prayers in the Qulasta constitute prayers 179–232, all of which are also duplicated in Parts 2 and 3 of The Wedding of the Great Shishlam. There are two sequences, with the latter sequence consisting of two series.

- 180–199 (identical to 285–304): Qabin prayers (1st sequence) (Prayers 1–20 in Part 2 of the Oxford Collection in Mark Lidzbarski's Mandäische Liturgien (1920); also repeated in Part 2 of The Wedding of the Great Shishlam)
  - 181: putting the lbuša (garment) on Manda d-Hayyi
  - 182: putting the himiana (belt) on Manda d-Hayyi
  - 183: putting the ksuia (tunic) on Manda d-Hayyi
  - 184: putting the naṣipa (stole), named Šamašeil, on Manda d-Hayyi
  - 185: putting the taga (crown) on Manda d-Hayyi
  - 186: putting the šarwala (leggings), named Nṣab, on Manda d-Hayyi
  - 187: putting the margna (staff) on Manda d-Hayyi
  - 188: putting the klila (wreath) on Yawar
- 200–214: Qabin prayers (2nd sequence, 1st series) (201–205 correspond to Prayers 21–33 in Part 2 of the Oxford Collection in Mark Lidzbarski's Mandäische Liturgien (1920); also repeated in Part 3 of The Wedding of the Great Shishlam)
  - 208: the bridegroom's various pieces of clothing
  - 210: the Seven bowing down before the bridegroom
- 215–232: Qabin prayers (2nd sequence, 2nd series) (repeated in Part 3 of The Wedding of the Great Shishlam): songs praising the bride and bridegroom

The kḏ azil bhira dakia prayers, which constitute prayers 233–256 of the Qulasta and are repeated in Part 3 of The Wedding of the Great Shishlam, come after qabin prayer 232.

All of the prayers above have been published using typesetted Mandaic by Majid Fandi Al-Mubaraki in Ktaba ḏ-Qabin (Book of Marriage), which makes up Part 2 in Volume 2 of Al-Mubaraki's Qulasta set (initially published in 1999 and subsequently revised in 2010).

== Prayer sequence ==
In Part 1 of The Wedding of the Great Shishlam, the prescribed sequence of Qulasta prayers (numbered below according to Drower's 1959 Canonical Prayerbook) to be recited is as follows.

- 26–28 (1st repetition)
- 26–28 (2nd repetition)
- 179
- 173
- 26–28 (3rd repetition)
- 35, 9
- 15–17
- 180
- 188
- 197–199
- 248
- 179
- 207–215
- 199
- kḏ azil bhira dakia prayers (253 is skipped)

== See also ==
- Qabin, the Mandaean wedding ritual
- Gospel of Philip, which may have been used as a Valentinian wedding ritual text
- Song of Songs
