= Miriai =

Character in Mandaean religious scripture

- Born: c. 1st century AD; Palestine
- Tradition or genre: Mandaeism

Miriai or Meryey (Classical Mandaic: ࡌࡉࡓࡉࡀࡉ) was a Mandaean woman mentioned in Mandaean scriptures. Miriai is one of the most important figures in the Mandaean Book of John, which contains detailed stories and speeches of Miriai in chapters 34 and 35. Miriai lived in a Mandaean village in Judea around the first century CE. According to the Mandaean Book of John, she was a contemporary of Elizabeth, the mother of John the Baptist.

Miriai is also the protagonist in two rahma prayers, numbered 149 and 162 in E. S. Drower's 1959 Canonical Prayerbook (i.e., the Qulasta).

== Story ==
In Mandaean scriptures such as the Mandaean Book of John, Miriai criticizes the Jewish religious tradition from which she had come from while extolling the virtues of Mandaeism. Miriai is considered to have descended from "priest-kings" of Judea, and one of her duties was to clean the Jewish temple. Due to her conversion to Mandaeism and lateness in getting home, Miriai's father condemns her and calls her a prostitute. Ultimately, Miriai is depicted as a Mandaean priest and teacher.

The Mandaean Book of John often mentions Miriai together with Enišbai (Elizabeth), the mother of John the Baptist, as two holy women who lived in the vicinity of Jerusalem.

== In other religions ==
The Mandaic name Miriai is cognate with the Hebrew name Miriam. Miriai may ultimately be linked to Mary, the mother of Jesus, but the Mandaean story of Miriai is not apparently related to any stories in the canonical Christian gospels. However, in the extracanonical Protoevangelion of James, which remained important to Orthodox Christians and had a significant impact on Orthodox and Catholic Mariology, the story is strikingly similar to that of Miriai in the Mandaean Book of John. Both are contemporaries of and associated with Elizabeth, both are young women who stem from important Judean families, and both are placed as young virgins to serve in the Second Temple. Later in the story, both are accused of adultery, and both defend themselves before the priests, with both of them denying they had committed adultery with a man. Moreover, in both the stories, parallels between birds on the one hand and Miriai and Mary on the other are made.

According to Charles G. Häberl, Christians identify Miriai with Mary, the mother of Jesus. Muslims identify Miriai with Miriam, older sister of Moses. Mandaeans do not identify both Mary and Miriam as being Miriai, insisting that she was a different woman bearing the same name. Some identify Miriai with Mary Magdalene.

== See also ==
- Mariamne
- Jesus in Mandaeism
