= Alma Rišaia =

Religious texts of Mandaeism

Information
- Religion: Mandaeism
- Language: Mandaic language

Alma Rišaia or Diwan Alma Rišaia ("The Supreme World" or "The First World") is a series of Mandaean religious texts that serve as esoteric priestly ritual commentaries. The texts make copious references to prayers in the Qulasta by quoting the opening lines of each prayer.

== Texts ==
There are two texts that complement each other in the Alma Rišaia series:

- Alma Rišaia Rba, or "The Great(er) Supreme World"
- Alma Rišaia Zuṭa, or "The Smaller Supreme World"

English translations of the two texts were published by E. S. Drower in 1963. Drower based the translations on manuscripts 41 and 48 of the Drower Collection (abbreviated DC 41 and DC 48).
