= Matthias Norberg =

Swedish orientalist

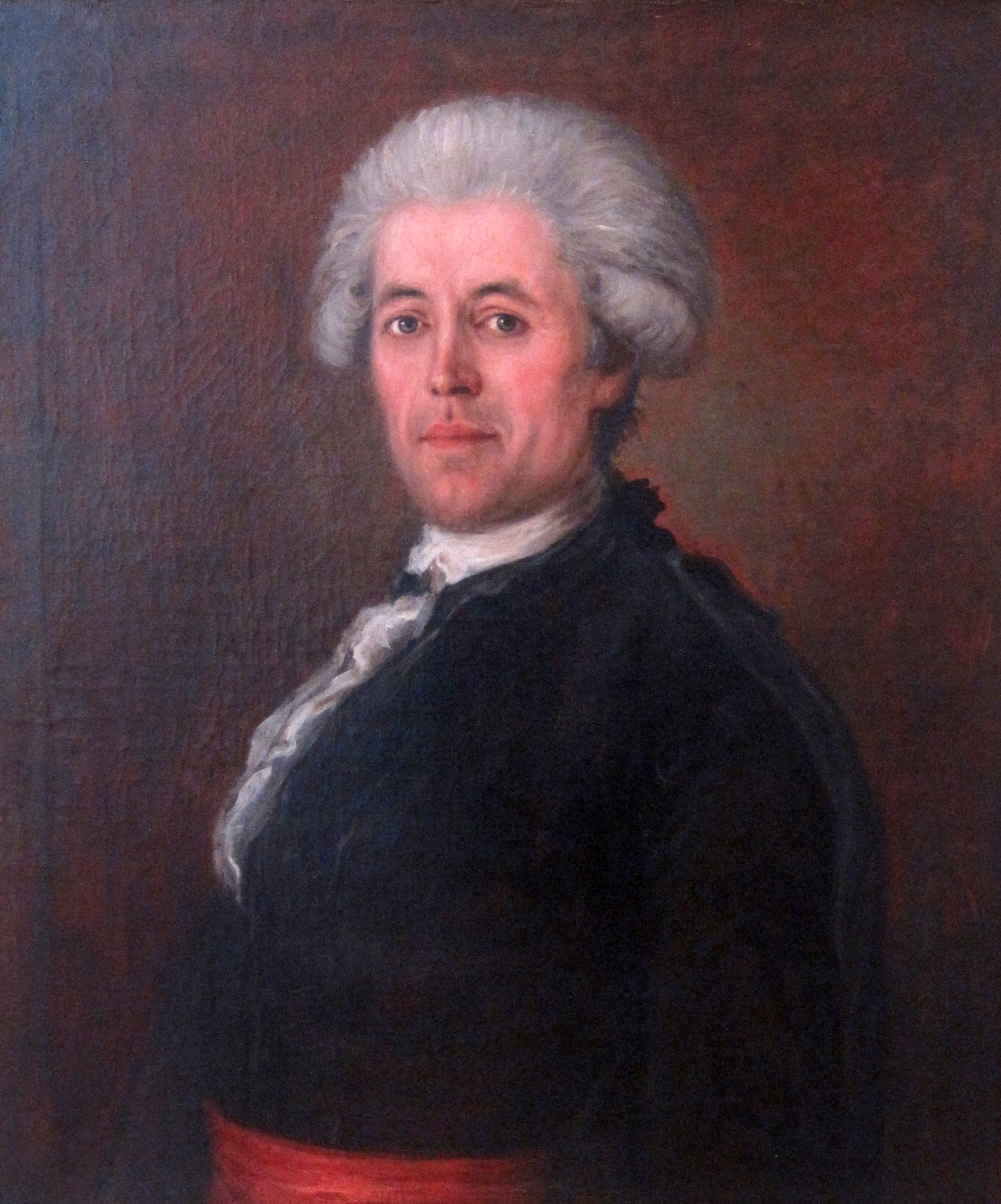
- Matthias Norberg
- Born: 1747; Nätra, Ångermanland, Sweden
- Died: 1826 (aged 78–79); Uppsala, Sweden
- Occupation(s): Swedish professor of Greek and Oriental languages at Lund University

Matthias Norberg (1747–1826) was a Swedish professor of Greek and Oriental languages at Lund University.

== Life ==
He was born in 1747 in Nätra, Ångermanland in northern Sweden.

Matthias Norberg belonged to a very wealthy northern farming family descended from his grandfather Mats Isaksson in Norrtjärn in Nätra parish in Ångermanland. Matthias Norberg's father Matthias Matsson Norberg (1694–1764) was the crown sheriff and director of the linen industry in the East.

He died on 67 January 1826 in Uppsala, Sweden.

== Career ==
Norberg became a student in Uppsala University in 1768, receiving his Master of Arts in 1773 and became an associate professor of the Greek language in 1774. In 1777 he undertook, with royal support, a trip through Denmark, Germany, Netherlands, England, France and Italy.

In Paris, he encountered Mandaean manuscripts, as well as several Syriac manuscripts. This sparked his interest in Oriental studies.

In 1780, he was appointed a professor of Oriental languages and Greek at Lund University.

From 1815 to 1816, Norberg published a Latin translation of the Ginza Rabba, titled Codex Nasaraeus liber Adami appellatus (3 volumes). The original Mandaic text, transcribed in Syriac script, was also printed alongside the Latin translation.

Norberg was elected in 1821 as a member of the Royal Swedish Academy of Sciences.
