= Qulasta =

Collection of Mandaean prayers

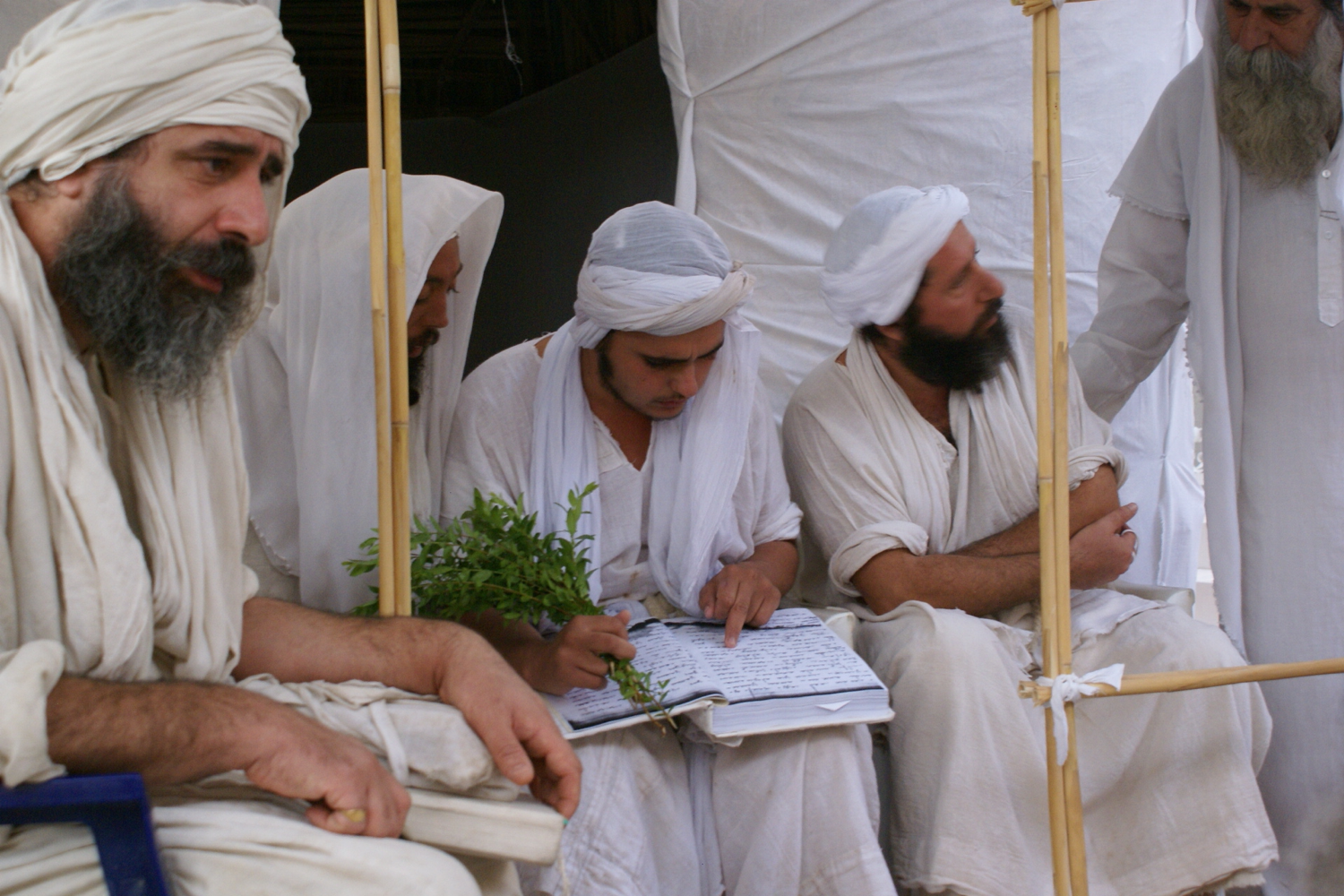
The young man in the middle, who is undergoing the tarmida initiation ceremony, is reading the Sidra ḏ-Nišmata, the first section of the Qulasta, as he sits in front of the andiruna.

The Qulasta, also spelled Qolastā in older sources (Classical Mandaic: ࡒࡅࡋࡀࡎࡕࡀ, romanized: Qulasta; Modern Mandaic: Qōlutā), is a compilation of Mandaean prayers. The Mandaic word qolastā means "collection".

The prayerbook is a collection of Mandaic prayers regarding baptisms (maṣbuta) and other sacred rituals involved in the ascension of the soul (masiqta). In Mandaic, individual prayers are generally called butha (plural form: bawatha), although some prayers also known as qaiamta, šrita (loosing or deconsecration prayers), and other Mandaic designations. There is no standardized version of the Qulasta; different versions can contain varying numbers of prayers, and ordering of the prayers can also vary. The most commonly used Qulasta versions are those of E. S. Drower (1959 English translation) and Mark Lidzbarski (1920 German translation). Excluding duplicates, the most complete versions have approximately 340 prayers, depending on how variants and duplicates are counted.

Eric Segelberg (1958) contains a detailed study of many of the first 90 Qulasta prayers (many of which are known in Mandaic as buta) as used in Mandaean rituals.

== Date ==
The Qulasta, and two other key texts to Mandaic literature, the Mandaean Book of John and the Ginza Rabba, may have been compiled together. However, their date of authorship is heavily debated, some believing it to be during the second and third centuries, and others believing it to be conceived during the first century. A study of the colophons of this text would appear to push back a date to the third century at the latest.

In the first colophon of the Qulasta (directly after prayer 74), Nukraya, son of Šitil, a scribe from the earliest part of the Islamic period, wrote that he copied the text while consulting at least seven manuscripts (ṭupsia). One of them belonged to "a library in a house of 'a People of the Book'" (anašia ḏ-ktiba), while another originated from "a town of Byzantines" (i.e., Byzantine Christians), indicating that Mandaean liturgical texts were being kept in non-Mandaean libraries at the start of the Islamic period.

In 1949, Torgny Säve-Söderbergh argued that at many passages in the Manichaean Psalms of Thomas were paraphrases or even word-by-word translations of Mandaean prayers in the Qulasta. Säve-Söderbergh also argued that the Manichaean psalms had borrowed from Mandaean sources rather than vice versa. As a result, much of the Qulasta can be dated to before the 3rd century, i.e. before Mani's lifetime. However, some scholars such as Kevin van Bladel believe that the material shared with the Psalms of Thomas may only be the use of a common source (perhaps Elkesaite funerary hymns), and that the text as a whole may date considerably later. Van Bladel also argues that the present form of the text must post-date the early Muslim conquests at minimum, given the references made in the Qulasta to the advancement of the Arab armies.

== Translations and manuscripts ==
In 1867, Julius Euting published a printed Mandaic version of the Qolasta.

The Qulasta has been translated into English by E. S. Drower in 1959 and by Mark Lidzbarski into German in 1920. Lidzbarski's translation was based on two manuscripts, including Ms. Syr. F. 2 (R) held at the Bodleian Library, which he called "Roll F."

E. S. Drower's version of the Qulasta contains 414 prayers (just under 340 prayers if excluding duplicated prayers), which was based on manuscript 53 of the Drower Collection (abbreviated DC 53). The fragmentary DC 3, which is an incomplete codex of the Qulasta, was also consulted by Drower. DC 53 was copied in 1802 by the ganzibra Adam Yuhana, the father of Yahya Bihram, in Hoveyzeh in what is now Khuzestan province of Iran. The manuscript was purchased by Drower in 1954.

In 2002, Carlos Gelbert translated the 103 prayers from Lidzbarki's Mandäische Liturgien into Arabic. A typesetted Mandaic version has also been published in 1998 by Majid Fandi Al-Mubaraki.

In 2025, Carlos Gelbert and Mark J. Lofts published a full English translation titled The Qulasta, which includes all of the prayers in Drower (1959).

== Contents ==
=== Mandäische Liturgien (Lidzbarski 1920) ===
Part 1 of Mark Lidzbarski's Liturgien (1920) (commonly abbreviated ML in Mandaic studies), titled the Qolastā, has only 103 prayers. Part 2 includes 4 books from the "Oxford Collection," with 60, 33, 19, and 20 prayers respectively for books 1-4. Part 2 has 132 prayers total; combined, Part 1 and Part 2 have 235 prayers. All of the prayers have the original Mandaic transcribed in Hebrew letters side-by-side with their respective German translations.

Mandäische Liturgien (1920) contents

- Part 1: Qolastā
  - Book 1 (prayers 1–31): Masbuta liturgy
  - Book 2 (prayers 32–74): Masiqta liturgy
  - Book 3 (prayers 75–77): 3 prayers for masbuta and masiqta
  - Book 4 (prayers 78–103): Songs and hymns for masbuta and masiqta
- Part 2: Oxford Collection
  - Book 1: 60 rahma devotional prayers which correspond to CP 106–160, 165–169 in Drower (1959).
  - Book 2: 33 marriage (qabin) prayers. The first 20 prayers correspond to CP 180–199 in Drower (1959), while the remaining correspond to various parts of CP 201–205.
  - Book 3: 19 prayers (kḏ azil bhira dakia series) which correspond to various parts of CP 233–240, 243–246, 250–251, 253, 255 in Drower (1959).
  - Book 4: 20 drabsha (banner) prayers which correspond to CP 329–347 in Drower (1959).

CP 104–105, 161–164, 170–179, 200, 305–328, 348–385, and various other prayers in Drower (1959) are not found in Lidzbarski (1920).

Lidzbarski's Mandäische Liturgien differs substantially from Drower's Canonical Prayerbook, since different manuscripts had been consulted.

A detailed outline of the contents of the Oxford Collection, along with corresponding CP prayer numbers in Drower (1959), is provided in the section below.

==== Oxford Collection ====
The 2nd section of Lidzbarski's 1920 book consists of the Oxford Collection, a 4-part collection of 132 prayers.

- Part 1 (rahmia or devotional prayers, corresponding to CP 106–160, 165–169):
  - Prayers for the times of the day (CP 106–118): 1, 2, 3, 4, 5, 6, 7, 8, 9, 10, 11, 12, 13
  - Sunday prayers (CP 119–124): 14, 15, 16, 17, 18, 19
  - Monday prayers (CP 125–130): 20, 21, 22, 23, 24, 25
  - Tuesday prayers (CP 131–136): 26, 27, 28, 29, 30, 31
  - Wednesday prayers (CP 137–142): 32, 33, 34, 35, 36, 37
  - Thursday prayers (CP 143–148): 38, 39, 40, 41, 42, 43
  - Friday prayers (CP 149–154): 44, 45, 46, 47, 48, 49
  - Saturday prayers (CP 155–160): 50, 51, 52, 53, 54, 55
  - Prayers of the fruit of ether (CP 165–169): 56, 57, 58, 59, 60
- Part 2 (marriage prayers, corresponding to CP 180–199, 201–205):
  - (CP 180–199): 1, 2, 3, 4, 5, 6, 7, 8, 9, 10, 11, 12, 13, 14, 15, 16, 17, 18, 19, 20
  - (CP 201–205):
    - (CP 201): 21, 22, 23
    - (CP 202): 24, 25, 26
    - (CP 203): 27, 28, 29
    - (CP 204): 30, 31
    - (CP 205): 32, 33
- Part 3 (kḏ azil bhira dakia prayers, corresponding to CP 233–240, 243–246, 250–251, 253, 255):
  - (CP 233–236): 1, 2, 3, 4
  - (CP 237): 5, 6
  - (CP 238–240): 7, 8, 9
  - (CP 243): 10
  - (CP 244): 11, 12
  - (CP 245–246): 13, 14
  - (CP 250–251): 15, 16
  - (CP 253): 17, 18
  - (CP 255): 19
- Part 4 (banner prayers, corresponding to CP 330–347 except for prayer 20, which corresponds to CP 329):
  - Prayers for unfurling the drabsha (CP 330–336): 1, 2, 3, 4, 5, 6, 7
  - Prayers for carrying the drabsha (CP 337): 8, 9
  - Prayers for carrying the drabsha (CP 338–341): 10, 11, 12, 13
  - Prayer for holding the drabsha (CP 342): 14
  - Prayer before the baptism (CP 343): 15
  - Prayers after the baptism (CP 344–345): 16, 17
  - Prayers for wrapping the drabsha (CP 346–347): 18, 19
  - Prayer for loosening the crown (taga) (CP 329): 20

=== Canonical Prayerbook (Drower 1959) ===
The 414 prayers in E. S. Drower's 1959 Canonical Prayerbook (commonly abbreviated CP in Mandaic studies) are categorized into the following sections.

Mandaeans typically refer to their canonical prayers as being part of the sections listed below (for example, the Book of Souls), rather than as part of the "Qulasta" (since Qulasta simply means 'Collection').

Prayer numbers	Section
1–31	Book of Souls (Sidra ḏ-Nišmata) (Baptism Liturgy)
32–72	Book of Souls (Sidra ḏ-Nišmata) (Masiqta Liturgy)
73–74	The Letter (ʿngirta) prayers
75–77	Hymns of praise
78–103	The Responses (ʿniania)
104	Rušma (Daily ablution prayer)
105	Salutation of Kings (Asiet malkia)
106–169	Rahmia (Daily devotional prayers)
170	Ṭab ṭaba lṭabia (the full Commemoration prayer for the dead, and living)
171–172	Hymns of praise etc.
173	Šumhata (The "Names")
174–176	Hymns of praise etc.
177	Little New Year's Feast prayer
178	Prayer for "honoring" the crown
179–232	Hymns for marriage (hadaiata)
233–256	Kḏ azil Bhira Dakia (When the proven, pure one went) (prayer series, for a new priest)
257–304	Hymns for marriage and a new priest (repeated)
305–329	Coronation prayers and hymns (including two for myrtle)
330–347	Drabša (Banner) prayers and hymns
348–374	Zidqa Brika (Blessed Oblation) prayers and hymns
375–381	Blessings on the chief celebrant after Blessed Oblation
382–385	Myrtle prayers and hymns
386–409	Repetitions of coronation prayers and hymns
410	Prayer of Yahia
411–414	Miscellaneous hymns

There are 8 colophons in DC 53, which means that the manuscript had originally consisted of at least 8 separate texts. As a result, Buckley (2010) provides the following outline for Drower's Canonical Prayerbook (CP) based on the DC 53 colophons:

- Part 1, the Book of Souls (also called the Book of Gadana): CP 1–74, dates to the 3rd century
  - CP 1–31: the baptismal liturgy
  - CP 32–72: the masiqta prayers
  - CP 73–74: the 2 "Letter" (ʿngirta) prayers
- Part 2: CP 75–77: 3 long prayers of praise
- Part 3: CP 78–103: the "responses" (ʿnianas)
- Part 4: CP 104–169
  - CP 104: a rušuma, i.e., "signing" prayer
  - CP 105: "The Healing of Kings"
  - CP 106–164: the rahmas, "devotions," prayed 3 times a day
  - CP 165–169: "The Fruits of Ether"
- Part 5: CP 170–199
  - CP 170: Ṭabahatan, "Our Ancestors"
  - CP 171–178
  - CP 179: acrostic prayer
  - CP 180–199: prayers for priest initiation and for the marriage ceremony
- Part 6: CP 200–284
  - CP 200–232
  - CP 233–256: priest initiation prayers
  - CP 257–284
- Part 7: CP 285–304 (duplicates of other prayers)
- Part 8: CP 305–329: priest initiation prayers
- Remaining part (no colophon): CP 330–414
  - CP 330–347: drabša prayers
  - CP 348–374: zidqa brikha prayers
  - CP 375–381: prayers after zidqa brikha
  - CP 382–385: myrtle (klila) prayers
  - CP 386–409: duplicates of CP 305–329 (with CP 329 ordered first, then from CP 305 onwards)
  - CP 410: prayer of Yahya
  - CP 411–414: miscellaneous prayers

=== Qulasta (Al-Mubaraki 2010) ===
Majid Fandi Al-Mubaraki has published a two-volume set of Qulasta prayers containing the printed Mandaic text of the prayers. It was originally published in 1998 and 1999, and republished in 2010 as an electronic CD-ROM version. Volume 1 corresponds to Part 1 of Lidzbarski (1920), and Volume 2 partially corresponds to Part 2 (the "Oxford Collection") of Lidzbarski (1920). The contents are as follows, with Drower's CP numbers provided as well. The prayers in Al-Mubaraki's Qulasta correspond to prayers 1–259 and 410 in Drower (1959). Note that a zhara (lit. 'warning') is a name insertion used by the person reciting the prayer.

- Sidra ḏ-Nišmata (Book of Souls) (Volume 1)
  - maṣbuta: 1–31 (with zharia after 18, 30, 31)
  - masiqta: 32–72
  - engirta: 73–74 (with zhara after 74)
  - bauata ḏ-tušbihta (prayers of praise): 75–103 (with zharia after 77 and 103)
- Ktaba ḏ-Eniania (Book of Responses) (Volume 2, Part 1)
  - rušuma: 104
  - asut malkia: 105
  - rahmia: 106–118
  - rahmia ḏ-iumia (daily rahmia prayers): 119–164
    - iuma ḏ-habšaba (Sunday): 119–124
    - iuma ḏ-trin habšaba (Monday): 125–130
    - iuma ḏ-tlata habšaba (Tuesday): 131–136
    - iuma ḏ-arba habšaba (Wednesday): 137–142
    - iuma ḏ-hamša habšaba (Thursday): 143–148
    - iuma ḏ-rhaṭia (Friday): 149–154
    - iuma ḏ-šapta (Saturday): 155–162
    - iuma ḏ-habšaba (Sunday): 163–164
  - abatar bauata ḏ-iumia (after the daily prayers)
    - 165–169
    - zhara
    - 170–174
    - 2, 4, 6 (šrita (loosing or deconscrating) prayers)
    - 178
    - 410
    - 175–177
- Ktaba ḏ-Qabin (Book of Marriage) (Volume 2, Part 2)
  - bauata ḏ-qabin: 179–232
  - kḏ azil bhira dakia: 233–256
  - zharia ḏ-hušbania ḏ-iumia (zharia for reckoning of days)
    - Sunday to Saturday zharia
    - zhara ḏ-nasakia (zhara of scribes)
    - 257–259
    - zhara

=== Qulasta (Gelbert & Lofts 2025) ===
The Qulasta, translated and edited by Carlos Gelbert and Mark J. Lofts (2025), includes a total of 339 prayers (excluding variants) or 342 prayers (including 3 variant prayers: #258, #259, and #412) organized into 8 groups. The Šabania Šaia and Right Ginza hymns are not counted as Qulasta prayers. The prayer numbers below, indicated by pound signs (#), follow the numbering system in Drower (1959). Gelbert & Lofts (2025) includes excerpts of introductions, footnotes, and commentary from Lidzbarski (1920) and Drower (1959), as well as an analysis of passages in the Psalms of Thomas with parallels in Mandaean texts.

- Group 1 (74 prayers): The Book of Gadana, which contains the baptism and commemoration hymns (#1–#74) (74 prayers)
  - Baptism (maṣbuta) (#1–#31)
  - Commemoration of the dead (masiqta) (#32–#74)
  - 1st colophon
- Group 2 (3 prayers): Three prayers (#75–#77)
  - 2nd colophon
- Group 3 (26 prayers): The responses (eniania = maṣbuta and masqita prayers) (#78–#103)
  - 3rd colophon
- Group 4 (66 prayers): The daily hymns (rahmia) (#104–#169)
  - Rušma = Rušuma (3 prayers): The Sign (the daily ablutions) (#104)
  - Asut Malkia (Salute to the Kings) (#105)
  - #106–#118
  - Sunday (#119–#124), Monday (#125–#130), Tuesday (#131–#136), Wednesday (#137–#142), Thursday (#143–#148), Friday (#149–#154), Saturday (#155–#160) hymns
  - Saturday evening and fruits of aether hymns (#161–#169)
  - 4th colophon
- Group 5 (9 prayers excluding variants; 12 prayers including variants): Ungrouped hymns (#170–#178; variants: #258–#259 and #412)
  - Abahatan Qadmaiia (ṭab ṭaba l-ṭabia) (#170 = #411)
  - The Šal Šulta (#171 = #257) (a long prayer invoking various uthras)
  - #172, #258, #259 (three variants of the same prayer asking Hayyi for the forgiveness of sins)
  - The Šumhata (The Names) (#173)
  - #174, #175 and #412 (interrogation of the soul; #175 and #412 are two variants of the same prayer), #176 (kušṭa asiak prayer), #177 = #413 (vines hymn), #178
- Group 6 (78 prayers, excluding the Šabania Šaia and Right Ginza hymns): Wedding (qabin) hymns (#179–#256; #260)
  - 1st sequence (#179 = #206; #180–#199 = #285–#304)
    - 5th colophon
  - 2nd sequence
    - 1st series (#200–#214)
    - 2nd series: the wedding songs (#215–#232)
    - 3rd series: "when/where the chosen pure one went" (kḏ azil bhira dakia) (#260; #233–#256 = #261–#284). These prayers all begin with the line, "When the chosen pure one went" (kḏ azil bhira dakia) "to the place where the Perfected Ones dwell" (l-atra ḏ-iatbia tušlimia).
  - Šabania Šaia (the weekly forecast of hourly fortune): Sunday, Monday, Tuesday, Wednesday, Thursday, Friday, Saturday (including nights for each)
  - 6th colophon (or astrological colophon)
  - 3 Right Ginza hymns: 15.15, 15.16, 15.17 (These hymns also start with the opening line, kḏ azil bhira dakia.)
  - Hymn repetitions (DC 53)
    - #257–#284
      - 7th colophon
    - #285–#304
      - 8th colophon
- Group 7 (44 prayers): Coronation and banner hymns (#305–#347; #414)
  - Coronation (taga) hymns
    - #305–#328 = #387–#409
      - Seven hymns of Šišlam-Rba (#305–#311)
      - Seven responses (Note: Known as pasuk in Mandaic, meaning the part of an antiphonal hymn recited by a priest) to the hymns of Šišlam-Rba (#312–#318)
      - Hymn of the seal-ring (#319)
      - Hymn of distributing the crowns (#320)
      - Hymn of receiving the crowns (#321)
      - Hymn of sewing the crowns (#322)
      - Various other coronation hymns (#323–#328)
    - #414
    - #329 = #386 (hymn for the consecration of the crowns)
  - Banner (drabša) hymns
    - #330–#347
  - 9th colophon
- Group 8 (39 prayers): Zidqa brika prayers (#348–#385; #410)
  - Zidqa brika hymns (#348–#350)
  - Pihta hymns (#351–#357). Prayers #352–#355 begin with the line, "I am the white Pihta" (pihta ana hiuara).
  - Praises to Yawar (#358–#369). These prayers all begin with the line, "When He opened His garment (kḏ pta lbuša), and when radiance was created (u-kḏ ziua ʿṣṭarar)."
  - Prayers to the cult hut (#370–#374)
  - Petitions to the Father of Glory (Mara ḏ-Rabuta) (#375–#385) (#376, #378, and #379 are very long prayers.)
  - Yahya's petition (#410)

== Frequently used prayers ==
One of the most important prayers is prayer 170, called the Ṭabahatan ("Our Ancestors"). As a commemoration prayer with a long list of names, the prayer starts with the line ṭab ṭaba lṭabia ("Good is the Good for the Good"). A different version of this prayer is found in DC 42, Šarḥ ḏ-Ṭabahata ("The Scroll of Ṭabahata" [Parents]), which is used during Parwanaya rituals.

In Mandaean rituals, many prayers are frequently recited in sets. Common sets of prayers listed in ritual texts such as the Scroll of Exalted Kingship, The Coronation of the Great Shishlam, the Alma Rišaia texts, and Zihrun Raza Kasia are given below. Drower's and Lidzbarki's numberings are equivalent for these prayers, since the first 103 prayers are nearly identical in both versions.

- 1, 3, 5, 19 ("four prayers for the crown": masbuta prayers for the turban and baptismal wreath)
- 22–24 (oil prayers)
- 25–28 (sealing prayers, or haṭamta)
- 32–34 (masiqta prayers)
- 9, 35 (prayers of radiance) (sometimes swapped as 35, 9)
- 59–60 (masiqta prayers for the pihta and mambuha)
- 71–72 (masiqta prayers for the souls)
- 75–77 (long praise prayers)
- 91–99 (ʿniania: masiqta response hymns)
- 101–103 (ʿniania: masiqta response hymns)

The "loosening prayers" are known as širiata.

== Recurring formulas ==
Many of the prayers in the Qulasta have recurring formulas such as:

- The bšuma: "In the name of Hayyi Rabbi" (Classical Mandaic: ࡁࡔࡅࡌࡀࡉࡄࡅࡍ ࡖࡄࡉࡉࡀ ࡓࡁࡉࡀ b-šumaihun ḏ-hiia rbia; or sometimes more simply as ࡁࡔࡅࡌࡀ ࡖࡄࡉࡉࡀ b-šuma ḏ-hiia), at the beginnings of prayers
- "And Hayyi is victorious" (Classical Mandaic: ࡅࡄࡉࡉࡀ ࡆࡀࡊࡉࡍ u-hiia zakin), at the ends of prayers
- "And praise be to Hayyi" (Classical Mandaic: ࡅࡌࡔࡀࡁࡉࡍ ࡄࡉࡉࡀ u-mšabin hiia), at the ends of prayers
- "(In the name of) Hibil, Šitil, and Anuš" (Classical Mandaic: ࡁࡔࡅࡌࡀࡉࡄࡅࡍ ࡖࡄࡉࡁࡉࡋ ࡅࡔࡉࡕࡉࡋ ࡅࡀࡍࡅࡔ (b-šumaihun ḏ-)Hibil u-Šitil u-Anuš) (Modern Mandaic pronunciation: [ˈhibɪl wə ˈʃitɪl wə ˈænnʊʃ])

== Correspondences with the Ginza Rabba ==
Several of the prayers in Drower's Canonical Prayerbook of the Mandaeans (CP), mostly ʿniania ("responses") and masiqta prayers, correspond to hymns in Book 3 of the Left Ginza (GL 3):

CP prayer	GL chapter
66	3.43
68	3.20
69	3.5 (many lines)
73	3.27
92	3.4
93	3.10
94	3.3
96	3.2
98	3.7

Prayer 66 also corresponds with Psalms of Thomas 6.

Some marriage hymns (hadaiata) in the Canonical Prayerbook also correspond to some hymns in Book 12 of the Right Ginza (GR 12):

- CP 179 = GR 12.2
- CP 214 = GR 12.4

== Use with other texts ==
Various esoteric texts used in priestly initiation ceremonies frequently refer to prayers in the Qulasta. These include:

- The Thousand and Twelve Questions
- Scroll of Exalted Kingship
- The Coronation of the Great Shishlam
- Alma Rišaia Rba
- Alma Rišaia Zuṭa
- Zihrun Raza Kasia
- Scroll of the Ancestors
- The Wedding of the Great Shishlam (for wedding ceremonies)

Many passages in these texts are essentially priestly commentaries on both the practical ritual applications and esoteric symbolism of specific prayers in the Qulasta.

== See also ==
- List of Qulasta prayers
- Asut Malkia
- Brakha
- Codex Marshall 691
- Gatha (Zoroaster)
- Haran Gawaita
- Psalms
- Tarmida § Prayer sequence
- Sidra d-Nishmata
