= Julius Heinrich Petermann =

German Orientalist (1801–1876)

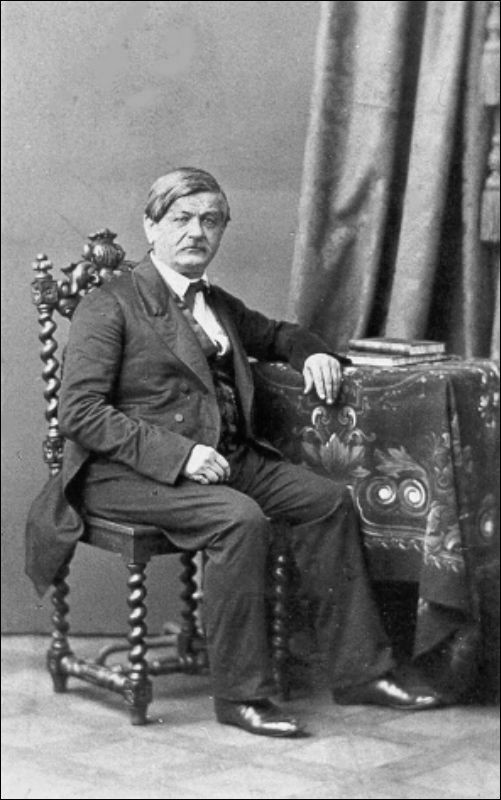
- Julius Heinrich Petermann
- Born: August 12, 1801; Glauchau
- Died: June 10, 1876 (aged 74); Bad Nauheim
- Occupation: Orientalist

Julius Heinrich Petermann (August 12, 1801, in Glauchau – June 10, 1876, in Bad Nauheim) was a German Orientalist.

== Biography ==
In 1829, Petermann received his PhD in Berlin for a dissertation on the Targum Jonathan of the Pentateuch. Between 1830 and 1837, he was first a lecturer, then from 1837 an associate professor of Oriental philology at the University of Berlin. Between 1852 and 1855, Johann Gottfried Wetzstein, the German consul in Damascus, and the Prussian king sponsored his travel to Syria, Mesopotamia and Persia. From 1868 to 1869, he was consul in Jerusalem. He learned Armenian from the Mekhitarist Father Eduard Hurmuz on the island of San Lazzaro, which is part of Venice. In his Grammatica Linguae Armeniacae he offers proof that Armenian is an Indo-European language. In 1851, he wrote about the Armenian culture and music and in 1866 about their history. Petermann was interested in religious minorities such as the Samaritans, Druze, Mandaean, Yazidis, Parsees and Ahl-i Haqq. Information on these groups is found in his two-volume travelogue Journeys in the Orient. His research on the Samaritans and the Mandaeans was pioneering. He learned the Samaritan pronunciation from a Samaritan priest of Hebrew tradition in Nablus. He began his writings on these ethnic groups with a critical edition of the Samaritan Pentateuch, which comprised the first two volumes. Volumes 3 to 5 were released by Karl Vollers. Petermann published the first edition and Latin translation of two Mandaean writings, the Ginza and Sidra Rabba respectively, ("The Treasure", "The Great Directory") in his Thesaurus sive liber magnus. He obtained a total of two collections of oriental manuscripts from 1532 for the Royal Library in Berlin. In 1840, he founded a series of concise textbooks, Porta linguarum Orientalium, on oriental languages, each with an anthology. In this series he published books on Arabic, Syriac, Armenian, Hebrew and Samaritan. Petermann was a member of the Berlin Masonic Lodge, Friedrich Wilhelm zur gekrönten Gerechtigkeit.

== Works ==
- Grammatica linguae armenicae (1837), Berlin
- De Ostikanis, Arabicis Armeniae gubernatoribus, Berlin, 1840
- Contributions to a history of the latest reforms of the Ottoman Empire, German and Turkish (with Ramiz Efendi), Berlin, 1842
- Epistola ad Philemonem speciminis loco ad fidem versionum Orientalium veterum, Berlin, 1844
- Pater Ignatii Patris Apostolici quae feruntur Epistolae, Leipzig, 1849
- Pistis Sophia: opus gnosticum (1851)
- Contributions to the history of the Crusades from Armenian sources, Berlin, 1860
- Journeys in the Orient, 1st edition. 2 vols. Leipzig, 1860 and 1861
- Journeys in the Orient, 2nd edition. Leipzig, 1865
- Thesaurus sive liber magnus liber vulgo Adami appellatus, 2 parts, Leipzig, 1867 (Mandaic and Latin versions of the Ginza Rabba)
- Attempt at a Hebraic morphology based on the Speech of Present-day Samaritans, 1868
- Pentateuchus Samaritanus, 5 vols. Berlin, 1872–91.
- Porta linguarum Orientalium (Editor) Vol. 1–4, 6, Berlin
  - Brevis linguae hebraicae, 1864
  - Brevis linguae arabicae, 1867
  - Brevis linguae armenicae, 1872
  - Brevis linguae chaldaicae, 1872
