= Sauma =

Fasting in Mandaeism

In Mandaeism, ṣauma (Classical Mandaic: ࡑࡀࡅࡌࡀ) is a term that means fasting. Although ṣauma can refer to physical fasting, it is more often used in Mandaeism to refer to spiritual piety and abstaining from sin.

On some days of the Mandaean calendar, Mandaeans perform light fasting. Unlike the Muslim fasting during Ramadan, Mandaeans do not completely forgo food and water for long periods. Instead, Mandaeans typically perform light fasting, such as abstaining from meat during certain mbaṭṭal (inauspicious) days.

== Spiritual fasting ==
The Mandaic term Ṣauma Rabba (Classical Mandaic: ࡑࡀࡅࡌࡀ ࡓࡁࡀ, romanized: Ṣauma Rba, lit. 'Great Fast') refers to a kind of "spiritual fasting" in which devout Mandaeans do not partake in the vices of the world and abstain from performing sinful activities.

The precepts of the Ṣauma Rabba, which exemplify the Mandaean tenets of pacificism, are mentioned in Book 1 and Book 2, Chapter 1 of the Right Ginza. Both have eight precepts that are identified with different parts of the body.

=== Right Ginza Book 1 ===
Book 1 of the Right Ginza explains that the Great Fast is not about food and drink but about moral and spiritual discipline. (Note that the following text is not directly quoted from any translated versions of the Ginza Rabba.)

1. Fast with your eyes by avoiding deceptive glances and ill intentions.
2. Fast with your ears by not listening to things that do not concern you.
3. Fast with your mouth by speaking truthfully and avoiding lies.
4. Fast with your heart by rejecting hatred, jealousy, and conflict.
5. Fast with your hands by refraining from violence and theft.
6. Fast with your body by staying away from forbidden relationships.
7. Fast with your knees by refusing to worship Satan or false idols.
8. Fast with your feet by not pursuing things gained through deceit.

The Great Fast must be kept until one’s departure from this world.

=== Right Ginza Book 2 ===
Book 2, Chapter 1 of the Right Ginza presents a similar set of instructions (not text directly from the translated ginza):

1. Fast with your head by staying firm in faith and praising the Lord.
2. Fast with your eyes by avoiding deceptive glances.
3. Fast with your mouth by rejecting false and harmful speech.
4. Fast with your ears by not listening to slander or deception.
5. Fast with your heart by staying pure in thought and faithful in action.
6. Fast with your body by keeping away from forbidden relationships.
7. Fast with your hands by not harming others.
8. Fast with your knees by refusing to kneel before false gods and perishable things.

The Fast was given for your benefit—remain steadfast until the end of your life.

== See also ==
- Ta'anit, or fasting in Judaism
- Fasting in Christianity
- Fasting in Islam, or sawm
- Ten Commandments
- Noble Eightfold Path in Buddhism
