= Shamish =

Sun in Mandaeism

- Member of the Seven Planets
- Affiliation: Yawar Ziwa, Simat Hayyi, Yurba
- Abode: World of Darkness
- Planet: Sun
- Parents: Ruha and Ur

Equivalents
- Akkadian: Shamash (Utu)

In Mandaeism, Shamish or Šamiš (Classical Mandaic: ࡔࡀࡌࡉࡔ, Modern Mandaic pronunciation: [ˈʃamɪʃ]) is the Mandaic name for the Sun. Shamish is one of the seven classical planets (Classical Mandaic: ࡔࡅࡁࡀ, romanized: šuba, lit. 'The Seven'), who are part of the entourage of Ruha in the World of Darkness.

== Etymology ==
Shamish's name is derived from š-m-š, the Semitic root for 'sun'. Shamish is also cognate with the Akkadian Šamaš.

== Associations and comparisons ==
Shamish is associated with the uthras Yawar-Ziwa (Dazzling Light) and Simat-Hiia (Treasure of Life). He is also identified with the uthra Yurba, who is described in detail in chapter 52 of the Mandaean Book of John.

In the Right Ginza, the Yazuqaeans (i.e., Zoroastrians) are associated with Shamish, an allusion to Mithra.

According to Iraqi-American poet Lamia Abbas Amara, "[Mandaean] priests have long beards and never cut their hair because they wish to look like Šamiš, the sun. Power resides in hair, like the sun’s rays."

Shamish is also associated with the false deity Adunai (derived from Hebrew Adonai). As a result, Mandaean scriptures contain exhortations for Mandaeans not to worship Shamish.
