= Mandaean Book of John =

Mandaean holy book ascribed to John the Baptist

Book of John Drāšā ḏ-Yaḥyā

Information
- Religion: Mandaeism
- Language: Mandaic language
- Period: compiled c. 7th century

In Mandaeism, the Book of John (Classical Mandaic: ࡃࡓࡀࡔࡀ ࡖࡉࡀࡄࡉࡀ, romanized: Drāšā ḏ-Yaḥyā) is a Mandaean holy book in Mandaic Aramaic which Mandaeans attribute to their prophet John the Baptist.

The book contains accounts of John's life and miracles, as well as a number of polemical conversations with Jesus and tractates where Anush Uthra (Enosh) performs miracles in the style of Jesus's deeds in Jerusalem. It was compiled around the 7th century A.D. shortly after the Muslim conquest of Persia from various texts, many of which were composed several centuries earlier. It was translated into English in its entirety for the first time by Gelbert & Lofts (2017). Häberl & McGrath (2020) was the first English-language critical edition from an academic publisher.

== Translations ==
A German translation, Das Johannesbuch der Mandäer, was published by Mark Lidzbarski in 1915. Another German translation of chapters 18–33 (the "Yahya–Yuhana" chapters) was published by Gabriele Mayer in 2021.

Charles G. Häberl and James F. McGrath published a full English translation of the Mandaean Book of John in 2020, which was printed alongside Mandaic text typesetted by Ardwan Al-Sabti. Another English translation was published by Carlos Gelbert and Mark J. Lofts in 2017.

== Manuscripts ==
Archived manuscripts of the Mandaean Book of John known to Western scholars include:

- Three Bibliothèque nationale de France manuscripts, also known as the Code Sabéen Mss. 8–10
  - Paris Ms. A
  - Paris Ms. B
  - Paris Ms. C
- Huntington MS 71 (abbreviated Hunt. 71, held in the Bodleian Library; Lidzbarski's D manuscript)
- DC 30 (Manuscript 30 of E. S. Drower's collection, held in the Bodleian Library). Purchased by E. S. Drower from Shaikh Nejm (also spelled "Negm") and Shaikh Yahya in November 1937. Dates to 1166 A.H. (c. 1753 A.D.). Copied in Shushtar by Ram Yuhana, son of Ram, Dihdaria.
- RRC 4G, copied at Qurna by Yahya Bihram in 1832–1833

Several folia (pages) in two manuscripts held at the British Library contain parts of the Mandaean Book of John:

- Folia 76–98 of Add. 23,602a
- Folia 99–101 of Add. 23,602a and 15–18 of Add. 23,602b

Buckley has also analyzed three manuscripts that are privately held by Mandaeans in the United States, including:

- Ms. Flushing, an original manuscript belonging to Nasser Sobbi. Copied by Sheikh Mhatam bar Yahya Bihram on April 9, 1910.
- Ms. Colonie (originally held at Niskayuna), photocopy of a manuscript belonging to Dr. Sinan A. J. Abdullah from Ahvaz. Copied by Bayan, son of Sharat (Salem Choheili) on April 12, 1989.
- Ms. San Diego, an original manuscript that belonged to Lamea Abbas Amara, who brought it to San Diego, United States from Nasiriyah, Iraq. Copied by Mhatam Zihrun bar Adam on May 13, 1922.

In Ahvaz, Iran, there is a copy of the Book of John with Mandaic text inscribed on lead plates (see also Mandaic lead rolls). Originally belonging to Abdullah Khaffagi, it was seen by Jorunn Jacobsen Buckley in 1973.

In 2004, Salah Choheili finished a copy of the Book of John. The colophon has been translated into English by Gelbert & Lofts (2017).

In the early 1900s, E. S. Drower had also transcribed the "Soul Fisher" chapters (36–39) from Sheikh Negm bar Zihrun.

== Dating ==
The chapters of the text are arranged according to their content, as opposed to their date, and the book as a whole may reflect five stages of redaction, which means that different chapters may date to different periods of time. The present form of the Mandaean Book of John dates no earlier than the Islamic conquests. Linguistically, the Islamic-era material can be found to date to the later stages of the composition and redaction of the Book of John.

The name "John" appears in the text as Yohannā or Yahyā. The former is pre-Islamic, whereas Yahyā is the form of the name known in the Quran. However, besides the name Yahyā, as well as a few other Arabic names, no Arabic-language influence on the Book of John is detectable. It is possible that the book capitalizes, at least in part, on John and his prophethood in order to secure their status as a "People of the Book" in the Islamic era. More recently, the elevated importance of John the Baptist and polemics against Jesus found across the Mandaean Book of John have been contextualized into Islamic-era inter-religious interactions.

The eleventh chapter (which also contains the latest stage of the language in the book) refers to the "end of the Age of Mars,” which corresponds to June 4, 678 in the Mandaean calendar and indicates that this chapter in particular should date to 678 or later. Chapters 18 and 27 refer to qombā d-kāhni, "Dome of the Priests," which may be a reference to a Muslim dome (qubba), in particular the Dome of the Rock constructed in 691, but also might refer to a Zoroastrian dome (gumbad).

Other clues exist to help date other chapters. For example, one argument holds that chapter 30 is likely post-4th century due the presence of loanwords like follis, crux, and other oblique references to Latin Christianity that better fit when it became the sole religion of the Roman Empire, as well as its criticism to institutionalized celibacy. However, it is also likely pre-Islamic given the absence of Arabic influence or references to Islamic material. A more recent analysis has identified an Arabic loanword in chapter 30, rumaia ("Roman") from Arabic rūmī, pushing back the date of this chapter to the Islamic era. Chapter 43 contains material about the Second Temple and its priests which only fit a first-century environment and so must stem from this era, although it is unclear how this material entered the Book of John.

== Contents ==
There are 76 chapters (or tractates) in the Book of John. Chapter titles from Gelbert & Lofts (2017) (based on the titles in Lidzbarski 1915) are given by default, with alternative titles from Häberl and McGrath (2020) given in square brackets. The contents are:

- Truth's Questions (1–2)
  - 1. Truth Stands by the Worlds' Entrance
  - 2. Truth Stands by the Worlds' Entrance
- Yushamin (3–10)
  - 3. Splendor Has Come to Me in Plenty
  - 4. By My Own Authority
  - 5. As My Father Yushamin Plotted
  - 6. On the Day the Intellect Taught Yushamin
  - 7. When I, Yushamin, Thought
  - 8. A Voice Came to Me in the Jordan
  - 9. Whom Shall I Call, Who Would Answer Me
  - 10. I Said That I Would Be Great
- The Good Shepherd (11–12)
  - 11. I Am a Shepherd Who Loves His Sheep
  - 12. An Excellency Calls from Beyond
- The Creation (13 and 60)
- Truth's Shem (Šum Kušṭa) (14–17)
  - 14. Truth's Shem Begins Teaching
  - 15. Truth's Shem Begins Teaching (cf. Psalms of Thomas 18)
  - 16. Truth's Shem Begins Teaching
  - 17. Truth's Shem Begins Teaching (cf. Psalms of Thomas 17)
- John-Johannes (Yahya Yuhana) (18–33)
  - 18. A Child was Transplanted from on High
  - 19. I Shine in the Name of My Father
  - 20. The Sun Sat in its Seclusion
  - 21. Did I Not Go Away Alone and Return?
  - 22. He Called Out a Proclamation to the World
  - 23. Beware for Me, My Brothers
  - 24. I Was in the House of My Seclusion
  - 25. Noble Men, Who Are Sleeping
  - 26. The Ages Took No Pleasure in Me
  - 27. Is There Anyone Greater Than I?
  - 28. Lofty Strongholds Will Fall
  - 29. I Shine Forth in My Father's Name
  - 30. Who Told Jesus?
  - 31. The Spheres and the Chariot Trembled
  - 32. The Spheres and the Chariot Trembled
  - 33. At My Voice, Spheres Shake
- Miriai (34–35)
  - 34. I am Miriai, the Daughter of Babylon's Kings
  - 35. I am Miriai, a Vine
- The Soul Fisher (36–39)
  - 36. A Fisher am I
  - 37. A Fisher Am I, of the Great Life
  - 38. The Fisher Put on Bright Garments
  - 39. It Is the Voice of the Pure Fisher
- The Iron Shoe (40–41)
  - 40. An Excellency Preaches Forth from Beyond
  - 41. The Man Preaches from Beyond
- Admonitions from Manda d-Hayyi (42–47)
  - 42. It is the Voice of Manda d-Hayyi
  - Warnings (43–45)
    - 43. It is the Voice of Manda d-Hayyi
    - 44. Life's Herald Calls Forth (also in Right Ginza 15.18 according to the numbering in Lidzbarski 1915)
    - 45. Life's Herald Calls Forth
  - Three Wishes (46) [From Light's Place, I Left] (also in Right Ginza 15.19 according to the numbering in Lidzbarski 1915)
  - Warnings (47) [From Light's Place, I Left] (cf. Psalms of Thomas 12)
- Truth (48–51)
  - A Second Prayer (48) [Truth! I Testify to You] (also in Right Ginza 16.9)
  - The Plough (49) [Way Beyond, Beside the Barrier of Truth]
  - Warnings (50) [He Who Deals in Gifts and Rewards]
  - The River Kšaš (51) [Among Those Lying upon the Shore]
- The Planets (52–56)
  - Yōrabba (52) [He Shook and Disturbed Yurba]
  - Sén [the Moon] (53) [When the Shining was Planted] (also in Right Ginza 15.4)
  - The Alien Man in Jerusalem (54) [I Did Not and Do Not Want]
  - Hibil's Lament (55) [How Can I Rejoice?]
  - The Immaculate (56) [Whoever Keeps Perfect Within It]
- Life's Treasure (57–59)
- The Creation (60–62)
  - 60. To You I Speak and Teach
  - 61. Who Will Come Forth, and Who Will Tell Me?
  - 62. When the Earth Did Not Yet Exist
- The Aftermath (63–67)
  - 63. A Voice from on High Cried Out to Us
  - 64. I Have Come to This World
  - 65. In a Bright Cloud I Sit
  - 66. Way Out Beyond
  - 67. From Beyond, an Excellency Cries Out
- Manda d-Hayyi's Visits (68–69)
  - 68. When Manda d-Hayyi Went
  - 69. The Light was Planted
- Abatur's Lament (70–72)
  - 70. When the Scales Did Not Want
  - 71. When They Went Forth and Came to Abatur
  - 72. When He Came to Abatur
- Three Laments (73–75)
  - 73. A White Eagle Am I
  - 74. Excellent Enosh Spoke
  - 75. Over Yonder, by the Seashore
- Excellent Enosh in Jerusalem (76) [I Come with Sandals of Precious Stones]

Chapters 19–33 begin with the formula:

Yahya teaches in the nights,
and Yuhana [teaches] in the evenings of the night.

In Mandaic:

Iahia dariš b-liluia
Iuhana b-ramšia ḏ-lilia

== See also ==
- Ginza Rabba
