= Ginza Rabba =

Central religious text of Mandaeism

- 2011 English translation of the Ginza Rba by Carlos Gelbert

Information
- Religion: Mandaeism
- Language: Mandaic language

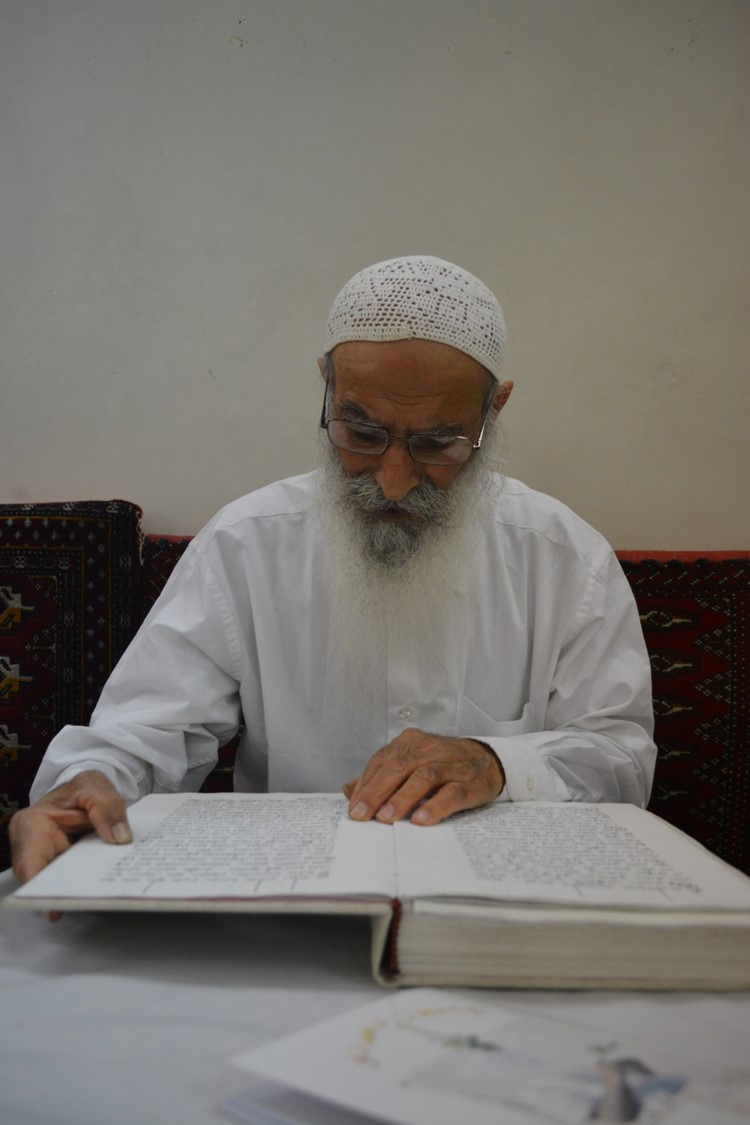
Salem Choheili reading the Left Ginza in Ahvaz, Iran

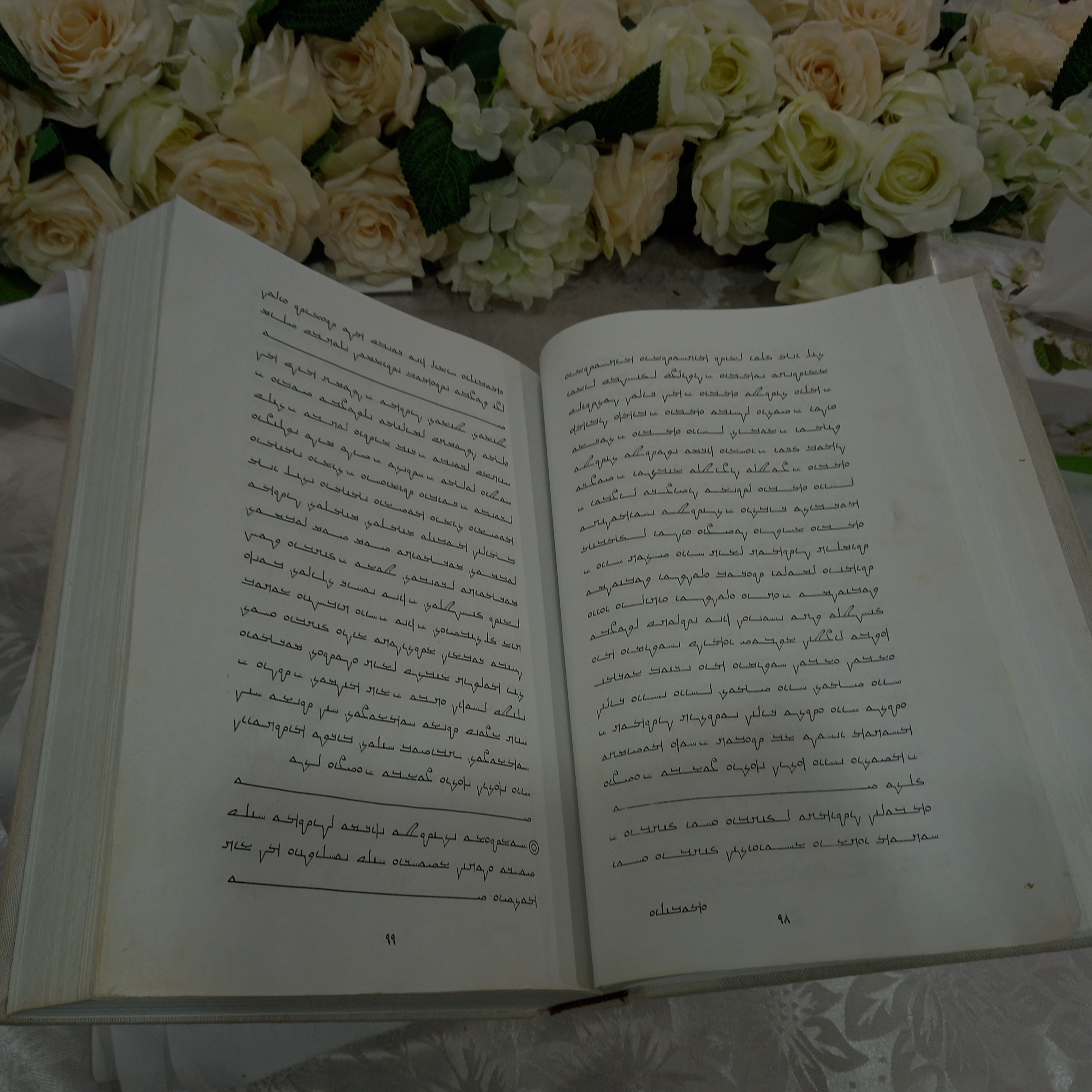
The Ginza Rabba (Mubaraki version) on the pulpit of a mandi

The Ginza Rabba (Classical Mandaic: ࡂࡉࡍࡆࡀ ࡓࡁࡀ, romanized: Ginzā Rbā, lit. 'Great Treasury', Modern Mandaic pronunciation: [ˈgɪnza ˈrɑbbɑ]), Ginza Rba, or Sidra Rabba (Classical Mandaic: ࡎࡉࡃࡓࡀ ࡓࡁࡀ, romanized: Sidrā Rbā, lit. 'Great Book'), and formerly the Codex Nasaraeus, is the longest and the most important holy scripture of Mandaeism.

The Ginza Rabba is composed of two parts: the Right Ginza (GR) and the Left Ginza (GL). The Right Ginza is composed of eighteen tractates and covers a variety of themes and topics, whereas the three tractates that make up the Left Ginza are unified in their focus on the fate of the soul after death. The Left Ginza is also occasionally referred to as the Book of Adam.

== Language and authorship ==
The language used is Classical Mandaic, a variant of Eastern Aramaic written in the Mandaic script (Parthian chancellory script), similar to the Syriac script. The authorship is unknown, and dating is a matter of debate, with estimates ranging from the first to third centuries. Determining date and authorship is complicated by the late date of the earliest manuscripts, the potentially lengthy oral transmission of Mandaean religious texts prior to their being written, and that conclusions about the dating of some tractates or either GR (Right Ginza) or GL (Left Ginza) may not carry over for material elsewhere in the Ginza.

== Dating ==
The date of Mandaean texts remains heavily contested. Even within the scope of the Ginza Rabba, the GL and GR are separate compositions with separate dates, making the Ginza Rabba a composite text of diverse origins. Furthermore, the individual tractates within these collections appear to have separate origins by virtue of their distinct genre, grammar, and according to their colophon evidence. The GL has its own colophon, as do the first thirteen tractates of the GR. Each from the fourteenth through eighteenth subsequent tractates have their own colophons. The current form and final compilation of the Ginza as a whole must come from Islamic times as it contains numerous references to the Arabs and the Islamic conquest.

=== Left Ginza ===
In 1949, Torgny Säve-Söderbergh argued that the third-century Coptic Manichaean Psalms of Thomas depended on the Left Ginza, A 2017 study by Kevin van Bladel instead suggests that both sources derived their shared material from a common source, perhaps Elcesaite funerary hymns.

In 1965, Rudolf Macúch argued for a third-century date on the basis of a colophon note saying that Zazai of Gawazta copied important Mandaean texts 368 years prior to the Arab conquest of Iraq c. 640, resulting in the date of 272. However, this note, extant from one manuscript, only refers to an unspecified year of the hijri calendar and not the point in time before 640. This means that 272 is the earliest possible date if the very first hijri year is being referenced, though later dates are not excluded. The number 368 itself may be invented.

=== Right Ginza ===
==== Book of Kings (GR 18) ====
GR 18, also known as the Book of Kings, says that "after the Persian kings there will be Arabian kings. They will reign seventy-one years." Starting with Theodor Nöldeke, historians have widely interpreted this as a reference to the Islamic-era Arab rulers, and so have dated GR 18 to the Islamic era. Recently, Häberl has argued from the colophons and external references that GR 18s dates to the rule of Lakhmid Arab kings in the pre-Islamic period. The latter is argued to place GR 18, separately from the rest of the Ginza Rabba, in the hands of a copyist at one point named Ennoš b. Danqā, who appears to have worked in the mid-7th century, implying the text is no later than ~650. The Arab kings reigning for 71 years are identified to be the Lakhmid kings starting with Al-Mundhir III ibn al-Nu'man, installed into power in 531 by Khosrow I (r. 531–579), to Khosrow II who deposed Al-Nu'man III ibn al-Mundhir in 602. To supplement this observation, Häberl points to the absence of Arabic language on or explicit references to Islam in GR 18 unlike later Mandaean texts. The final Sassanid ruler mentioned by the text is interpreted to be Kavad II, who ruled until 628, roughly giving the date soon after which the text entered its current form. Häberl offers the following chronology for the events mentioned in GR 18, alongside the earlier chronology implied by Nöldeke's work.

Event	Internal chronology	Nöldeke	Häberl
Destruction of Jerusalem	AP 1	214 BC	321/322 BC
Yazdiger, son of King Bahrān	AP 594	~380 AD	271/272 AD
Arab uprisings	AP 792	~578 AD	469/470 AD
King of the Arabs dies	AP 793	~579	470/471
Arabs become lords	AP 795	~581	472/473
False Messiah triumphs	>AP 803	>589	>480/481
Beginning of Arab rule	>AP 850	>636	>527/528
End of Arab rule	>AP 921	>707	>598/599
End of the world	AP 1001	~786	678/679

==== Other tractates ====
Book 7 of the Right Ginza uses the name Yahyā for John, which is the form of the name John that appears in the Quran. However, Häberl has argued that the use of this name is known in pre-Islamic Arabic text, and so its presence does not conclusively argue for an Islamic-era dating.

The Ginza may have been composed, at least partially, as a response to the Arab conquests, along with other pieces of Mandaean literature such as the Mandaean Book of John, and a study of the colophons of the Ginza date the emergence of the text to the second half of the seventh century.

== Structure ==
The Ginza Rabba is divided into two parts – the Right Ginza, containing 18 books, and the Left Ginza, containing 3 books. In Mandaic studies, the Right Ginza is commonly abbreviated as GR, while the Left Ginza is commonly abbreviated as GL. Alternatively, sometimes the Right Ginza is abbreviated as GY or Gy after the Mandaic Ginza Yamina, while the Left Ginza is commonly abbreviated as GS or Gs after the Mandaic Ginza Smala.

Ginza Rabba codices traditionally contain the Right Ginza on one side, and, when turned upside-down and back to front, contain the Left Ginza (the Left Ginza is also called "The Book of the Dead"). The Right Ginza part of the Ginza Rabba contains sections dealing with theology, creation, ethics, historical, and mythical narratives; its six colophons reveal that it was last redacted in the early Islamic Era. The Left Ginza section of Ginza Rabba deals with man's soul in the afterlife; its colophon reveals that it was redacted for the last time hundreds of years before the Islamic Era.

There are various manuscript versions that differ from each other. The versions order chapters differently from each other, and textual content also differs.

== Contents ==
The Ginza Rabba is a compilation of various oral teachings and written texts, most predating their editing into the two volumes. It includes literature on a wide variety of topics, including liturgy and hymns, theological texts, didactic texts, as well as both religious and secular poetry.

For a comprehensive listing of summaries of each chapter in the Ginza Rabba, see the articles Right Ginza and Left Ginza.

== Manuscript versions ==
Manuscript versions of the Ginza include the following. Two are held in the Bodleian Library at Oxford, three in the British Library in London, four in the Bibliothèque nationale de France in Paris, and others are in private ownership. All extant manuscripts of the Ginza appear to derive from a few copies that were produced around 1500.

- Bodleian Library manuscripts
  - DC 22 (copied by Ram Zihrun in 1831)
  - Huntington Ms. 6 (copied by Adam Paraš in 1615)
- British Library manuscripts catalogued under the same title, Liber Adami Mendaice
  - Add. 23,599 (copied by female priests during the 1700s)
  - Add. 23,600 (copied by Yahya Bihram bar Adam, of the Manduia and ‛Kuma clans, in 1735–36, who also copied Paris Ms. D)
  - Add. 23,601 (copied by Adam Yuhana bar Sam in 1824)
- Paris manuscripts, Bibliothèque nationale de France (consulted by Lidzbarski for his 1925 German translation)
  - Paris Ms. A (copied by Ram Baktiar in 1560)
  - Paris Ms. B (copied by Baktiar Bulbul in 1632; also called the "Norberg version," since it was used by Norberg during the early 1800s)
  - Paris Ms. C (copied by Yahya Adam in 1680)
  - Paris Ms. D (copied by Yahya Bihram in the early 1700s)
- Rbai Rafid Collection (RRC) manuscripts
  - RRC 5J (copied at the Margab quarter of Suq eš-Šuyūḵ in AH 1277 (1860–1861 AD))
  - RRC 5L (copied at the Margab quarter of Suq eš-Šuyūḵ in AH 1256 (1840–1841 AD))

For his 1925 German translation of the Ginza, Lidzbarski also consulted other Ginza manuscripts that were held at Leiden (complete) and Munich (fragmentary).

Jorunn Jacobsen Buckley has also found Ginza manuscripts that are privately held by Mandaeans in the United States. Two are in San Diego, California, which belong to Lamea Abbas Amara; they were originally copied by Mhatam Zihrun (Sheikh Dakhil Aidan) in 1935, and by a copyist named Adam (Sheikh Aidan, father of Dakhil) in 1886, respectively. One is in Flushing, New York, which belonged to Nasser Sobbi (1924–2018) and was originally copied by Adam Zihrun in 1928. Another one is in Lake Grove, New York, and belongs to Mamoon Aldulaimi, which was originally given to him by Sheikh Abdullah, son of Sheikh Negm and was copied by Yahya Ram Zihrun in 1940. A version of the Ginza by Mhatam Yuhana was also used by Carlos Gelbert in his 2011 English translation of the Ginza. Another manuscript known to Gelbert is a privately owned Ginza manuscript in Ahvaz belonging to Shaikh Abdullah Khaffaji, the grandson of Ram Zihrun.

Printed versions of the Ginza in Mandaic include:

- Norberg version (Mandaic, in Syriac script): A printed Ginza in Mandaic (printed using the Syriac alphabet) was published by Matthias Norberg in 1816. Based on Code Sabéen 2 (Paris Ms. B). It was republished by Gorgias Press in 2007.
- Petermann version (Mandaic): In 1867, Julius Heinrich Petermann published Mandaic and Syriac transcriptions of the Ginza Rabba. His work was based on four different Ginza manuscripts held at Paris, and relied most heavily on MS Paris A (also known as Code Sabéen 1). Only 100 copies were printed, 13 of which Petermann kept himself. A three-volume set of Petermann's work was republished by Gorgias Press in 2007.
- Mubaraki version (Mandaic, in both Mandaic and Roman scripts): The full Ginza Rba in printed Mandaic script, compiled primarily from the Mhatam Zihrun br rbai Adam manuscript from Iraq (copied in 1898 and dated 6 July 1899), was first published by Majid Fandi Al-Mubaraki, Haitham Mahdi Saed (also known as Brikha Nasoraia), and Brian Mubaraki in Sydney, Australia in March 1998 during Parwanaya. Two other Ginza versions were also consulted, including one copied by Ram Zihrun in Šuštar in 1843, and another one by Sam bar Zihrun, from the Manduia and ‛Kuma clans. A Roman transliteration of the entire Ginza Rba was also published in 1998 by Majid Fandi Al-Mubaraki and Brian Mubaraki. At present, there are two published Mandaic-language editions of the Ginza published by Mandaeans themselves. The Concordance of the Mandaean Ginza Rba was published by Brian Mubaraki and Majid Fandi Al-Mubaraki in 2004.
- Gelbert version (Mandaic, in Arabic script; derived from the Mhatam Yuhana version): The full Mhatam Yuhana Ginza manuscript from Ahvaz, Iran was transcribed in Arabic script by Carlos Gelbert in 2021. As the fourth edition of the Gelbert's Arabic Ginza, Gelbert (2021) contains an Arabic translation side by side with the Mandaic transcription.
- Al-Sabti version (Mandaic): In 2022, Rbai Rafid al-Sabti published a printed Mandaic version of the Ginza Rabba based on a comparison of 22 manuscripts. The Al-Sabti Ginza contains 157 chapters, 602 pages, 111,684 words, and 560,825 letters.

== Translations ==
Notable translations and printed versions of the Ginza Rabba include:

- Norberg version (Latin, 1816): From 1815 to 1816, Matthias Norberg published a Latin translation of the Ginza Rabba, titled Codex Nasaraeus liber Adami appellatus (3 volumes). The original Mandaic text, based on MS Paris B, was also printed in Syriac script alongside the Latin translation. There are also additional Onomasticon (glossary of names) and Lexidion (dictionary) volumes. Norberg's Codex Nasaraeus is known for influencing Helena Blavatsky, the 19th-century founder of the Theosophy movement, by way of Samuel Fales Dunlap's works.
- Lidzbarski version (German, 1925): In 1925, Mark Lidzbarski published the German translation Ginzā: Der Schatz, oder das grosse Buch der Mandäer. Lidzbarski translated an edition of the Ginza by Julius Heinrich Petermann from the 1860s, which in turn relied upon four different Ginza manuscripts held at Paris. Lidzbarski was also able to include some material from a fifth Ginza which was held at Leiden. In 2022, an unproofed English translation of Lidzbarski (1925) was published online by Ram Al Sabiry.
- Baghdad version (Arabic, abridged, 2000): An Arabic version of the Ginza Rabba, similar to that of the Al-Saadi (Drabsha) version, was first published in Baghdad in 2000. A Persian translation based on the 2000 Arabic Ginza was completed by Salem Choheili in 2021.
- Al-Saadi (Drabsha) version (English, abridged, 2012): Under the official auspices of the Mandaean spiritual leadership, Drs. Qais Al-Saadi and Hamed Al-Saadi published an English translation of the Ginza Rabba: The Great Treasure in 2012. In 2019, the second edition was published by Drabsha in Germany. The translation, endorsed by the Mandaean rishamas Salah Choheili (Salah Jabbar Tawos) and Sattar Jabbar Hilo, is designed for contemporary use by the Mandaean community and is based on an Arabic translation of the Ginza Rabba that was published in Baghdad. However, it has been criticized for being overly abridged and paraphrased.
- Gelbert version (English translation in 2011; Arabic translation in 2000, revised 2021): The first full English translation of the Ginza Rba was published by Carlos Gelbert in 2011, with the collaboration of Mark J. Lofts and other editors. The Mandaic transcription is mostly based on the Mhatam Yuhana Ginza Rba from Iran (transcribed in the late 1990s and published in 2004 under the supervision of Mhatam Yuhana, the ganzibra or head-priest of the Mandaean Council of Ahvaz in Iran). Most of the English translation was based on Mark Lidzbarski's 1925 German translation of the Ginza, along with additional English translations of passages from the Mubaraki and Mhatam Yuhana Ginzas that are not found in Lidzbarski (1925). Gelbert's 2011 edition is currently the only full-length English translation of the Ginza that contains detailed commentary, with extensive footnotes and many original Mandaic phrases transcribed in the text. An Arabic translation of the Ginza was also published by Gelbert in 2000, with the fourth edition published in 2021. The Arabic edition also contains the original Mandaic text transcribed in Arabic script.
- Häberl (2022): An English translation and analysis of the Book of Kings, the final book of the Right Ginza.

== See also ==
- Right Ginza
- Left Ginza
- Qulasta
- Mandaean Book of John
- List of Mandaic manuscripts
