= Qabin =

Mandaean wedding

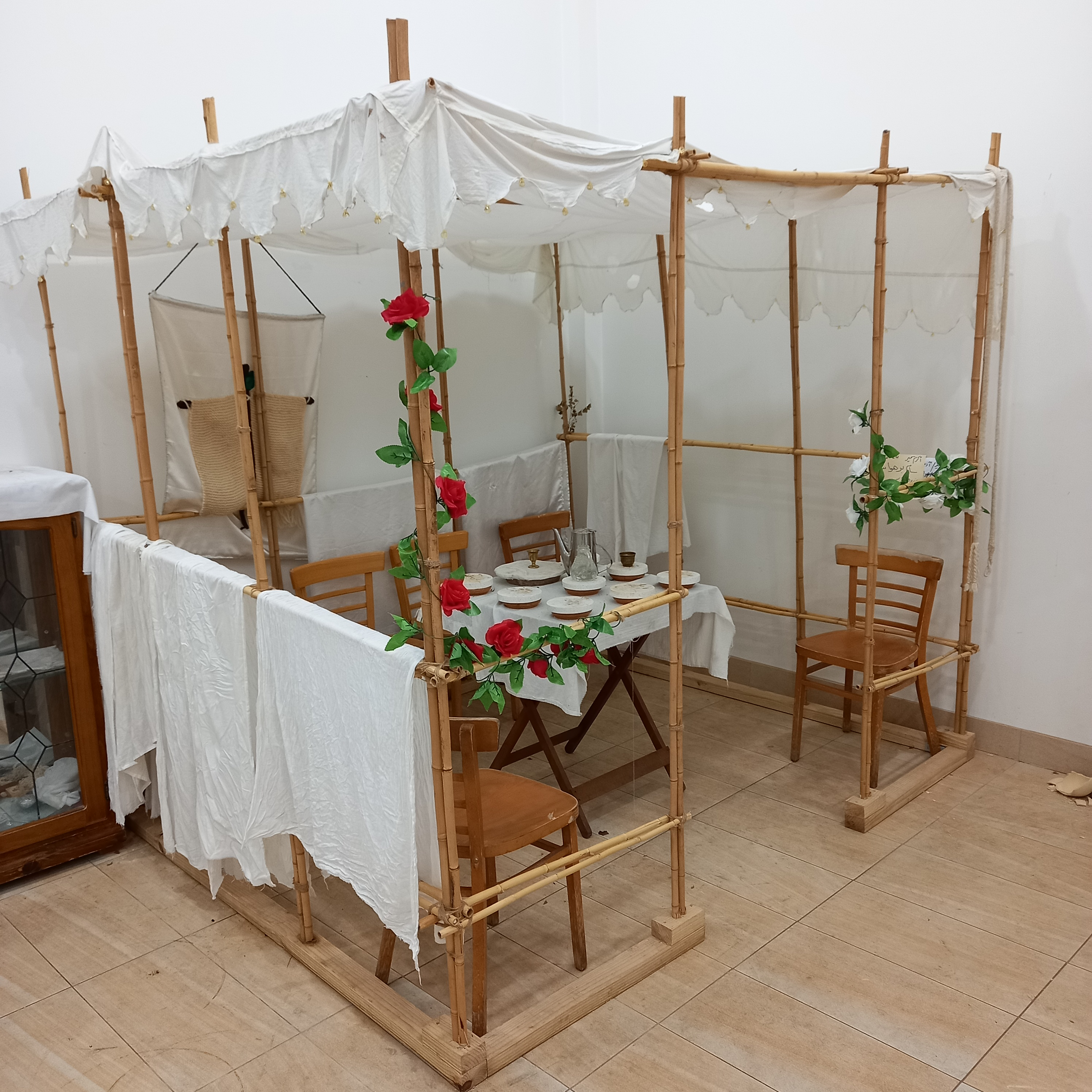
Wedding canopy (gnana) at Yahya Yuhana Mandi in Sydney, Australia

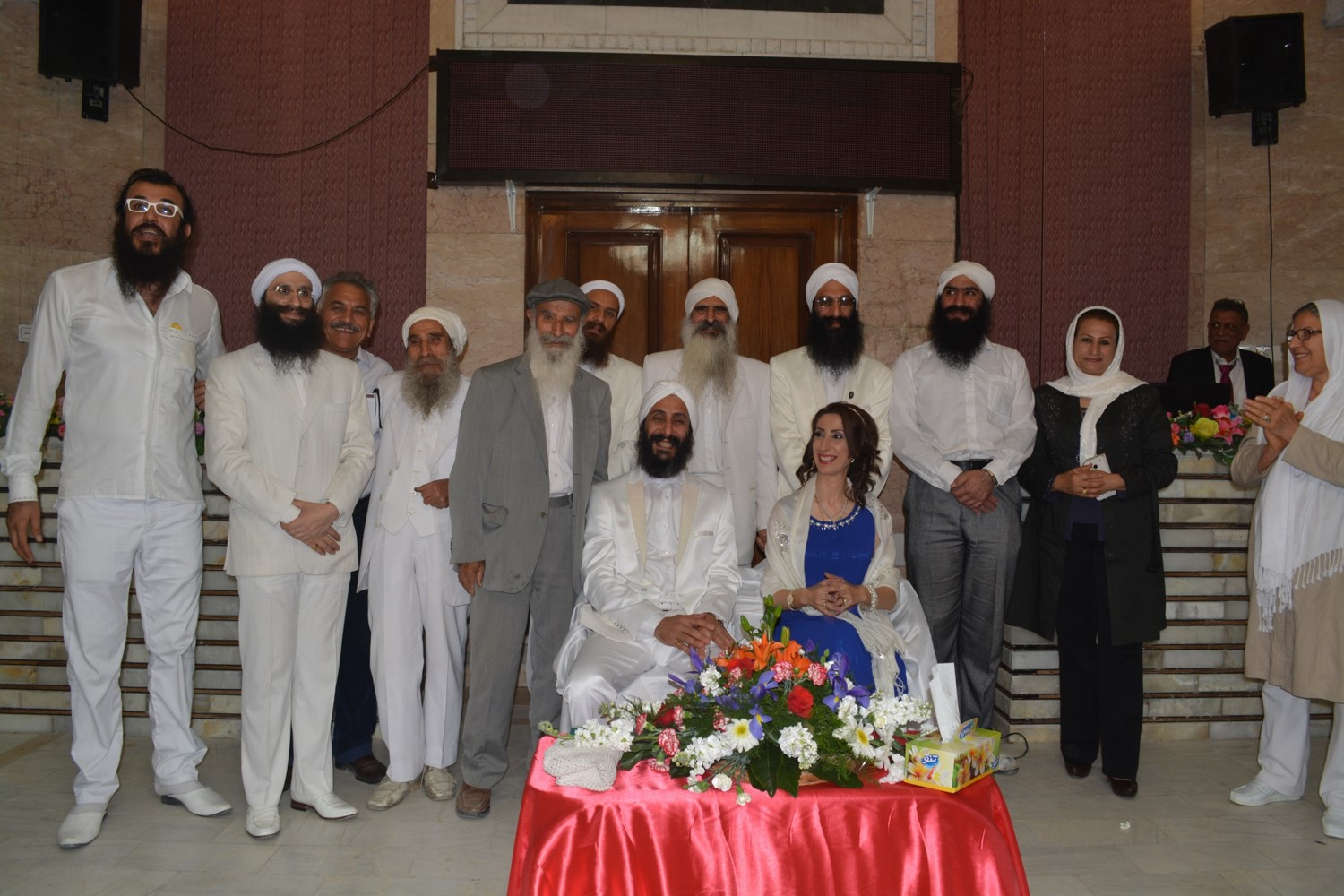
An engagement ceremony for Ganzibra Salwan Alkhamas and his fiancée in Ahvaz. The actual marriage ceremony (qabin) was performed in October 2015.

The qabin (Classical Mandaic: ࡒࡀࡁࡉࡍ) is the Mandaean wedding ritual. Mandaean weddings are typically held for several days. Traditionally, weddings must be officiated by a Mandaean priest and can only be performed for ethnic Mandaeans, although this has proved to be challenging for the contemporary Mandaean diaspora.

During the qabin wedding ceremony, a Mandaean priest reads prayers from The Wedding of the Great Šišlam. Zidqa brikha, which includes hamra and various dried fruits and nuts, is also offered and consumed. A bridal chamber called the gnana, consisting of a canopy and white cloth, is set up for the bride and groom.

Drower (1937: 59–71) contains a detailed account of a traditional Mandaean village wedding.

A wedding chamber or canopy used during Mandaean wedding ceremonies is called an andiruna, a term which is also used to refer to temporary reed huts used during priest initiation ceremonies.

== See also ==
- Jewish wedding
- Islamic marital practices
- Bridal Chamber in Valentinianism
- Qulasta
- List of Qulasta prayers
