= Carlos Gelbert =

Australian writer and translator

- کارلوس کلبرت
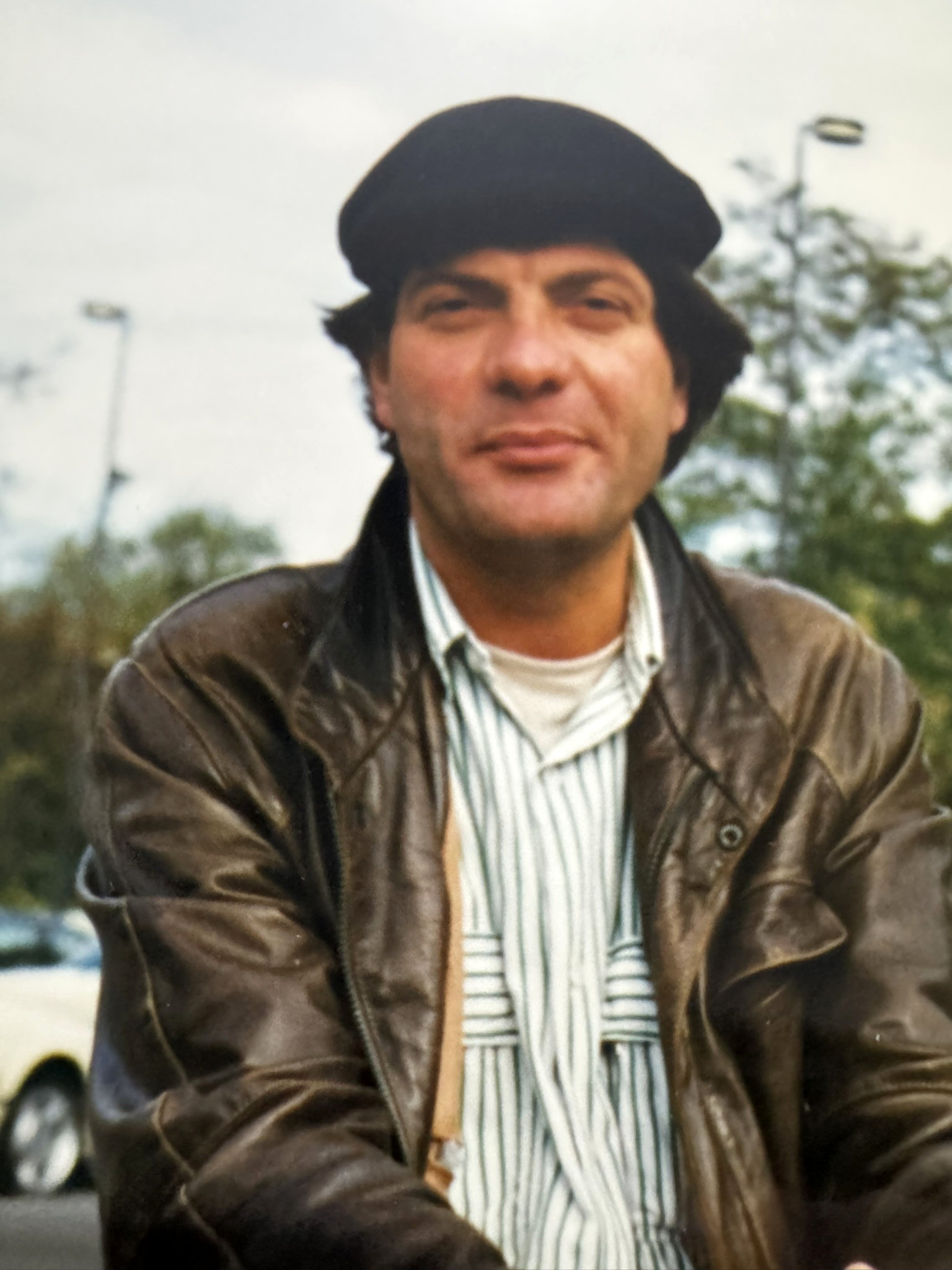
- Photograph of Carlos Gelbert in 1998, taken during his last holiday in the Netherlands before moving to Australia
- Born: 1948 (age 77–78); Basra, Iraq
- Citizenship: Australian
- Occupation: Writer
- Spouse: Sue Aran
- Writing career
- Language: English, Arabic, Mandaic, German
- Genres: Non-fiction; Fiction

Carlos Gelbert (born 1948) is an Australian writer and translator. He is best known for publishing the first full-length English translations of the Ginza Rba (2011) and Mandaean Book of John (2017) together with Mark J. Lofts. Gelbert has also translated the Ginza Rba (2021) into Arabic, as well as Mandaean Prayers and Hymns, a 2002 Arabic translation of the first 103 prayers of the Qulasta along with the original Mandaic text. In 2025, Gelbert published a full English translation of the Qulasta with Mark J. Lofts.

== Biography ==
Gelbert was born in 1948 in Basra, Iraq. During the Saddam Hussein era, he moved to Germany, where he worked as a teacher and occupational therapist. Gelbert immigrated to Australia in the 1990s and currently resides in the Sydney metropolitan area.

== Books authored ==
Below is a list of books authored by Gelbert.

=== Mandaean texts ===
- 2002. Mandaean Prayers and Hymns. ISBN 9780958034609. (Arabic; Mandaic in original script)
- 2011. Ginza Rba. ISBN 9780958034630. (English; co-edited with Mark J. Lofts)
- 2017. The Teachings of the Mandaean John the Baptist. ISBN 9780958034678. (English; co-edited with Mark J. Lofts)
- 2021. Ginza Rba. ISBN 9780648795407. (Arabic; Mandaic transliterated in Arabic script)
- 2025. The Qulasta. ISBN 9780648795438. (English; co-edited with Mark J. Lofts)

=== Mandaeism ===
- 2003. A Letter to My Son. ISBN 9780958034616.
- 2005. The Mandaeans and the Jews. ISBN 9780958034623.
- 2009. Jesus whose other name was Joash. Austin Macauley Publishers. ISBN 9781905609826.
- 2013. The Mandaeans (Last Gnostics) and the Christians in the time of Jesus Christ. ISBN 9780958034647. (discusses the history of the Mandaeans in Edessa during Late Antiquity)
- 2018. An Authentic Collection of Mandaean Stories and Fairy Tales. ISBN 9780958034685.
- 2023. The Key to All the Mysteries of Ginza Rba. ISBN 9780648795414. (glossary of more than 144 alphabetically arranged subjects)
- 2026. The Gnostic Parallels & Elements of the Nag Hammadi Codices in the Ginza Rba. ISBN 9780648795452.

=== Novels ===
English

- 2001. Stories of Marriage and Love. ISBN 9780646416601.
- 2014. The Daughter of The God Jupiter. ISBN 9780958034654.
- 2016. Those Who Love and Those Who Die. ISBN 9780958034661.
- 2025. Darion: The Blue Hare. London: Europe Books. ISBN 9791256972029.

German

- 1995. Ruth und Sarah. Aulendorf: Verlag Eppe GmbH. ISBN 9783890893594.
- 1996. Amadeus oder Ich liebe Gott. Aulendorf: Verlag Eppe GmbH. ISBN 9783890893617.
- 1996. Zeit der Lieblosigkeit. Aulendorf: Verlag Eppe GmbH. ISBN 9783890893600.

=== Others ===
- 2020. My Unordinary Sex Book. ISBN 9780958034692.
- 2024. Why On Earth Him? ISBN 9780648795421.
- 2026. Adolf Hitler & the Golden Shower of Sex. London: Europe Books. ISBN 9791256973507.
