= Mark Lidzbarski =

Polish philologist (1868–1928)

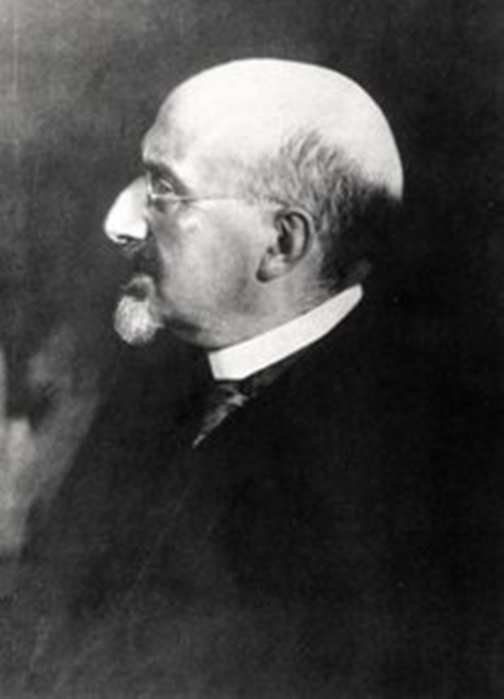
- Mark Lidzbarski
- Born: January 7, 1868; Płock, Russian Empire
- Died: November 13, 1928 (aged 60); Göttingen

Mark Lidzbarski (born Abraham Mordechai Lidzbarski, Płock, Russian Empire, 7 January 1868 – Göttingen, 13 November 1928) was a Polish philologist, Semiticist and translator of Mandaean texts.

== Early life and education ==
Lidzbarski was born in Russian Poland to a Hasidic Eastern Jewish family, and from 1889 to 1892 studied Semitic philology in Berlin. There he converted to evangelical Christianity and changed his first name to "Mark". In February 1896, he received his doctorate in Middle Eastern Studies at the University of Kiel.

== Career ==
In 1907, he succeeded William Ahlwardt as professor at the University of Greifswald, and in 1917, became professor in Göttingen as successor to Enno Littmann. From 1912, he was a corresponding member, and in 1918, a full member of the Göttingen Academy of Sciences.

== Lidzbarski Prize ==
The Lidzbarski Gold Medal for Semitic Philology is awarded annually by the German Oriental Society for work in Semitic studies and named after Mark Lidzbarski.

== Works ==
- Wer ist Chadhir?, in: Zeitschrift für Assyriologie 7 (1892), 104-116
- Einige Bemerkungen zu Stumme´s Tunisischen Märchen, in: ZDMG 48 (1894), 666-670
- Zum weisen Achikar, in: ZDMG 48 (1894), 671-675
- Geschichten und Lieder aus den neu-aramäischen Handschriften der Königlichen Bibliothek zu Berlin, Weimar: Emil Felber 1896 (= Beiträge zur Volks- und Völkerkunde IV)
- Eine angeblich neuentdeckte Rezension von 1001 Nacht, in: ZDMG 50 (1896), 152
- Ein Exposé der Jesiden, in: ZDMG 51 (1897), 592-604
- Handbuch der Nordsemitischen Epigraphik (2 vols)
  - Ephemeris für semitische Epigraphik (vol 1 1900-1902, vol 2 1903-1907, vol 3 1909-15)
  - Altsemitische Texte, erstes Heft: Kanaanäische Inschriften (Moabitisch, Althebräisch, Phönizisch, Punisch), Gießen: Alfred Töpelmann 1907
- Lidzbarski, Mark (1906). Uthra und Malakha. A. Töpelmann (vormals J. Ricker). (Internet Archive)
- Das mandäische Seelenbuch, in: ZDMG 61 (1907), 689-698
- Sabäisch „Orakel“, in: ZDMG 67 (1913), 182
- Das Johannesbuch der Mandäer. Einleitung, Übersetzung, Kommentar, Gießen: Alfred Töpelmann 1915
- Ubi sunt qui ante nos in mundo fuere, in: Der Islam 8 (1918), 300
- Ein Desideratum, in: Der Islam 8 (1918), 300-301
- Zu arabisch fahhar, in: ZDMG 72 (1918), 189-192
- Mandäische Liturgien. Mitgeteilt, übersetzt und erklärt, Berlín 1920 (= Abhandlungen d. königl. Ges. d. Wiss. zu Göttingen, phil.-hist. Kl. NF XVII, 1) (archive.org)
- Altaramäische Urkunden aus Assur, Leipzig: J.C. Hinrichs'sche Buchhandlung 1921 (Ausgrabungen der Deutschen Orient-Gesellschaft in Assur, E: Inschriften V) (ND Osnabrück: Otto Zeller 1970)
- Salam und Islam, in: Zeitschrift für Semitistik und verwandte Gebiete 1 (1922), 85-96
- Ginza. Der Schatz oder Das große Buch der Mandäer, Göttingen: Vandenhoek & Ruprecht/Leipzig: J.C. Hinrichs'sche Buchhandlung 1925
