= Micheus, Michar, and Mnesinous =

Baptismal figures in Sethian Gnosticism

In Sethian Gnostic texts, Micheus, Michar, and Mnesinous are the three heavenly spirits that preside over the rite of baptism, performed in the wellspring of Living Water. They are mentioned in the Nag Hammadi tractates of the Holy Book of the Great Invisible Spirit, Trimorphic Protennoia, Zostrianos, and Apocalypse of Adam. In the texts, the trio is frequently mentioned along with Yesseus Mazareus Yessedekeus, the name of the Living Water.

Occasionally in some of the Nag Hammadi texts, only Micheus and Michar are mentioned, without Mnesinous.

== Parallels ==
In Mandaeism, Bihram is the uthra (celestial spirit) presiding over the masbuta (baptism).

== See also ==
- Shilmai and Nidbai
- Adathan and Yadathan
- Xroshtag and Padvaxtag in Manichaeism
