= Zihrun Raza Kasia =

Mandaean text

Zihrun Raza Kasia Zihrun, the Hidden Mystery
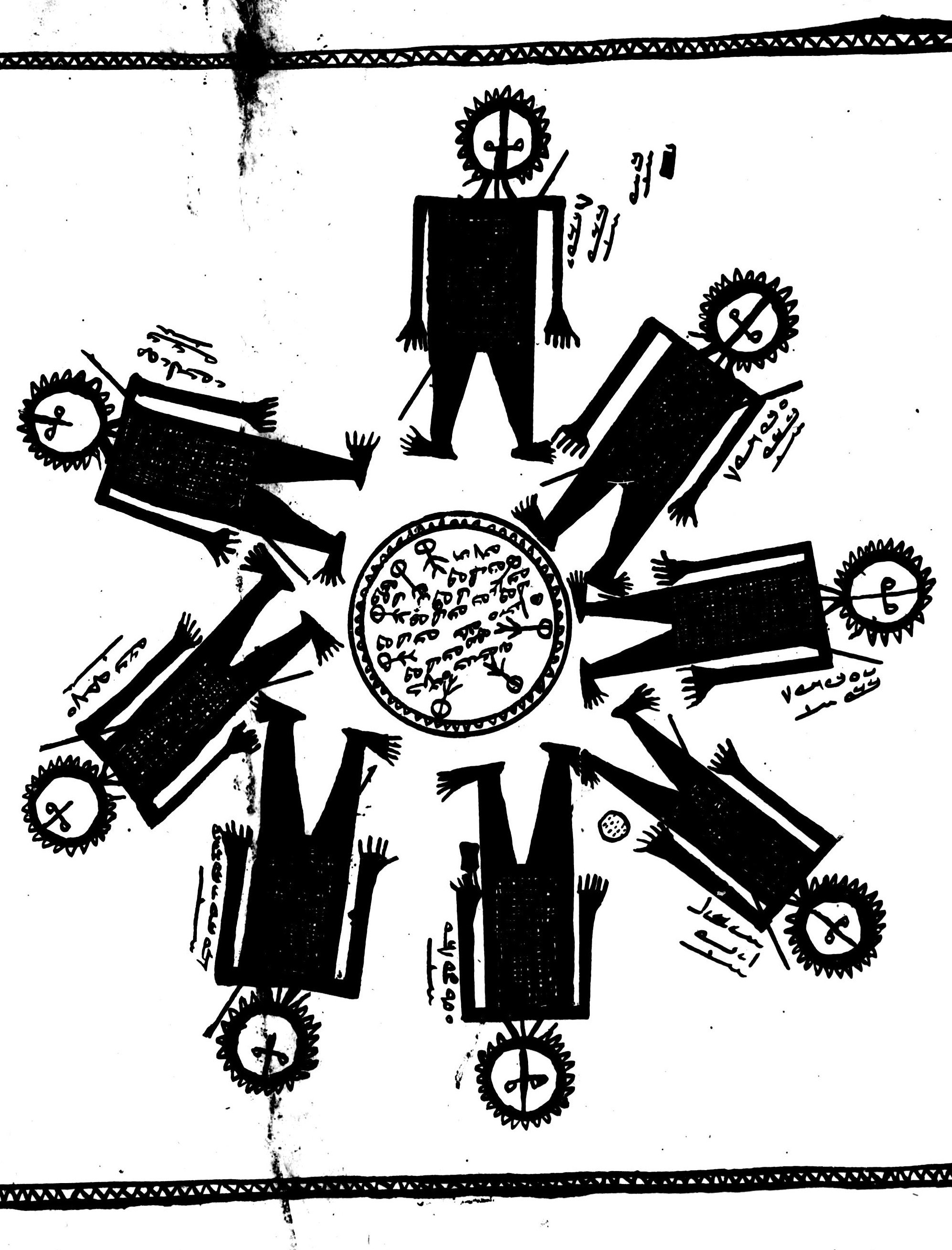
- An illustration of several uthria in Zihrun Raza Kasia (Ms. DC 27)

Information
- Religion: Mandaeism
- Language: Mandaic language

The Šarḥ ḏ-Zihrun Raza Kasia (Classical Mandaic: ࡔࡀࡓࡇ ࡖࡆࡉࡄࡓࡅࡍ ࡓࡀࡆࡀ ࡊࡀࡎࡉࡀ, Modern Mandaic pronunciation: [ˈzɪhrʊn ˈrɑzɑ ˈkæsjæ]; "The Scroll of Zihrun, the Hidden Mystery") is a Mandaean religious text that describes rituals such as the masbuta, masiqta, and other related topics. It is an illustrated scroll.

Zihrun (referred to as Zihrun Raza Kasia or "Zihrun the Hidden Mystery" in full) is the name of an uthra.

The name Zihrun Raza Kasia is also mentioned in the Mandaean prayer Asut Malkia.

== Manuscripts and translations ==
An illustrated scroll was purchased by E. S. Drower from Shaikh Yahia at Qal'at Saleh, southern Iraq in May 1937. Today, it is held as manuscript 27 in the Drower Collection of the Bodleian Library at Oxford University, and is commonly abbreviated DC 27.

Bogdan Burtea translated the DC 27 manuscript into German in 2008, and also provided a detailed commentary as part of the published translation.

The scroll consists of pieces of paper that have been glued together and is approximately 691 cm long, of which 660 cm contain writing and illustrations. The scroll is about 30 cm wide, with 26 cm used for writing. There are 559 lines of writing. A scribal note in the manuscript says that the text was copied in 1088 A.H. (1677 A.D.).

== Contents ==
The contents of the DC 27 scroll are:

- Lines 1–22: Introduction
- Lines 23–190: The baptism (masbuta) of Zihrun Raza Kasia
- Lines 231–232: Illustrations, with explanations
- Lines 191–231: Esoteric content
- Lines 232–523: The masiqta of Zihrun Raza Kasia
- Lines 524–559: Colophon

The masiqta of Zihrun Razia Kasia is performed for people who have died from unclean deaths, such as during one of the minor mbaṭṭal days (inauspicious days during which all rituals are forbidden), or from snakebite, attacks by wild animals, or insect bites.

== Ritual and prayer sequences ==
Below is the ritual and prayer sequence for both the Masiqta and Masbuta of Zihrun Raza Kasia in the Šarḥ ḏ-Zihrun Raza Kasia, as summarized in Burtea (2008). All prayer numbers, originally in Roman numerals, are from Part 1 (the Qolastā) of Mark Lidzbarski's Mandäische Liturgien (ML) unless otherwise specified (e.g., the Oxford Collection, which is Part 2 of Lidzbarski's Mandäische Liturgien, or CP, which is Drower's 1959 Canonical Prayerbook).

=== Masiqta of Zihrun Raza Kasia ===
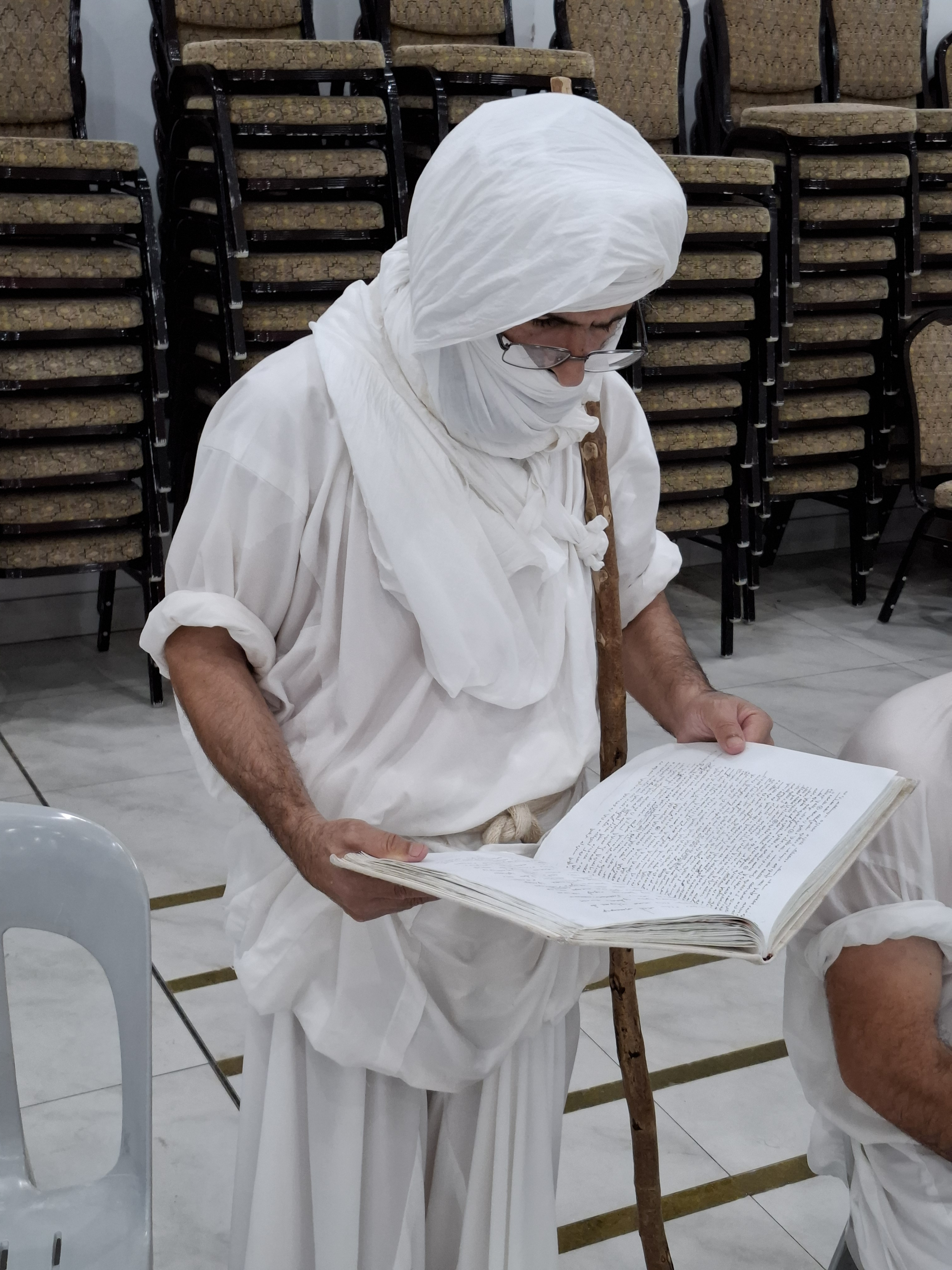
The pandama (mouth veil): Tarmida Sahi Bashikh wearing a pandama as he reads Mandaean prayers at Yahya Yuhana Mandi during Parwanaya 2025

Below is the ritual and prayer sequence for the Masiqta of Zihrun Raza Kasia as given in the text:

Ritual/Action	Prayers recited
rising	
raising the crown	1, 3, 5, 19
wrapping mouth-covering cloth (pandama)	32
hold bottle	33
incense into the fire	34
recitation	75–77, 9, 35
holding the wreath	46–47
oil	48
brushing with oil 3 times	49
3 strokes	50
3 strokes	51
pause drawing	52
3 strokes	53
separate the pihta from the wreath	
break off a piece of pihta	
mixing water with hamra	
recitation	54
remove the pandama	55–56
eat the pihta	
drinking mambuha (sacramental water)	
drinking halalta (rinsing water)	
rising	56
giving a bowl	57
recitation	58–71
putting hands on the bread	72
performing kušṭa	
recitation	75–77
wrapping pandama	32
holding bottle	33
putting incense into the fire	34
recitation	75–77, 9, 35
recitation for the hamra	44–45
recitation for the myrtle wreath	46–47
drawing with oil	48–49
holding the bottle	91
taking the qina	91
prepare 9 pihta	masiqta of the ancestors (dabahata)
wrapping the pandama	32
holding water	33
holding incense	34
incense into the fire	75
recitation	75–77, 9, 35
taking the pihta	36
recitation	36–43
taking the hamra	44
recitation	45
recitation for the myrtle wreath	46–47
taking the oil	48
spread with oil	49
recitation	50
holding back the hands	51
spreading	51
holding back the hands	52
drawing	
recitation	53
3 strokes	
remove the pihta from the wreath	
break a piece of the pihta	
mix water with hamra	
dip the pihta in hamra	
recitation	54
remove the pandama	55
eat pihta and drink hamra	
put incense into the fire	56
recitation	57–58
setting the table (patura)	59–60
recitation	61–69, 91–99, 70, 100
recitation	71–72
recitation	sinner, rahmia
performing kušṭa	30f. (ML 50, 10f.)
recitation	101–103, 63, 3
not honoring the crown	
recitation	108 (Oxford book 1, prayer 3)
bringing the ritual table and the patura	
eating and drinking water	
blessing the alms container	
sealing with the great seal	

Summary of the prayer sequence listed above:

- 1, 3, 5, 19
- 32–34
- 75–77, 9, 35
- 46–72
- 75–77
- 32–34
- 75–77, 9, 35
- 44–49
- 91
- dabahata
- 32–34
- 75
- 75–77, 9, 35
- 36
- 36–69, 91–99, 70, 100
- 71–72
- sinner, rahmia; 30f.
- 101–103, 63, 3
- 3

=== Masbuta of Zihrun Raza Kasia ===
Below is the ritual and prayer sequence for the Masbuta of Zihrun Raza Kasia as given in the text:

==== Ritual preliminaries ====
Ritual/Action	Prayers recited
recitation	Oxford book 1, prayer 1
raising of the crown	3, 5, 19
incense into the fire	8
honoring the crowns	quote from 71
preparation of the myrtle wreath	79
going to the river bank	80, 81
recitation	quote from 18
taking pandama	7
reciting for the incense	8
recitation	85–87, 35

==== Baptism in the river ====
Ritual/Action	Prayers recited
recitation	9–11
reciting for the turban	12
entry of the priest	13
preparation of the olive staff	14
recitation of the exorcism prayers	15–18
entrance of the baptized	
immersion, 3 times	
drawing, 3 times	76
3 times immersion with river water
erection of the myrtle wreath	9, 5
pronouncing the names	
rising of the baptized	
performing kušṭa	kušṭa heal you, and strengthen you
recitation	82
deconsecration of the river	20
ascension of the priest	21

==== Oil drawing ====
Ritual/Action	Prayers recited
recitation of the oil	22–24
performing kušṭa	kušṭa heal you, my wreath

==== The meal for the baptized ====
Ritual/Action	Prayers recited
recitation	8 prayers of the pihta
recitation for mambuha	44–45
eating pihta	
drinking mambuha	
performing kušṭa	kušṭa heal you
recitation of the sealing prayers	25–28
rising	29
recitation of the hymn of baptism	30
recitation of the baptismal prayers	82–90
drinking water 3 times	71
recitation	72
performing kušṭa	kušṭa heal you

==== Priestly meal ====
Ritual/Action	Prayers recited
eating pihta	
drinking mambuha	
recitation	59–60

==== Conclusion ====
Ritual/Action	Prayers recited
recitation	57, 72, CP 171
performing kušṭa with the ašganda
recitation	63
baptism of the banner (drabša)	
recitation of names (zharia)	

Summary of the entire masbuta prayer sequence listed above:

- 1, 3, 5, 19
- 8
- 71
- 79–81
- 18
- 7–8
- 85–87, 35
- 9–18
- 76
- 9, 5
- 82
- 20–24
- 8 pihta prayers
- 44–45
- 25–30
- 82–90
- 71–72
- 59–60
- 57, 72, 171
- 63

== Illustrations ==
Zihrun Raza Kasia (DC 27) contains two large illustrations: one depicting uthras, and another one depicting plants.

=== Uthras ===
Below is an illustration of uthras in the World of Light in Zihrun Raza Kasia (DC 27). Clockwise starting from the top-center figure (standing upright): Nidbai Rba, riha ("incense"; small rectangular block to the right of Nidbai Rba), Adatan Rba, [u-]Iadatan Rba, Hibil Ziua, ašganda (priest's assistant, the only figure without a margna), Mara ḏ-Rabuta ("Father of Greatness"), Anuš Rba, Šilmai Rba.

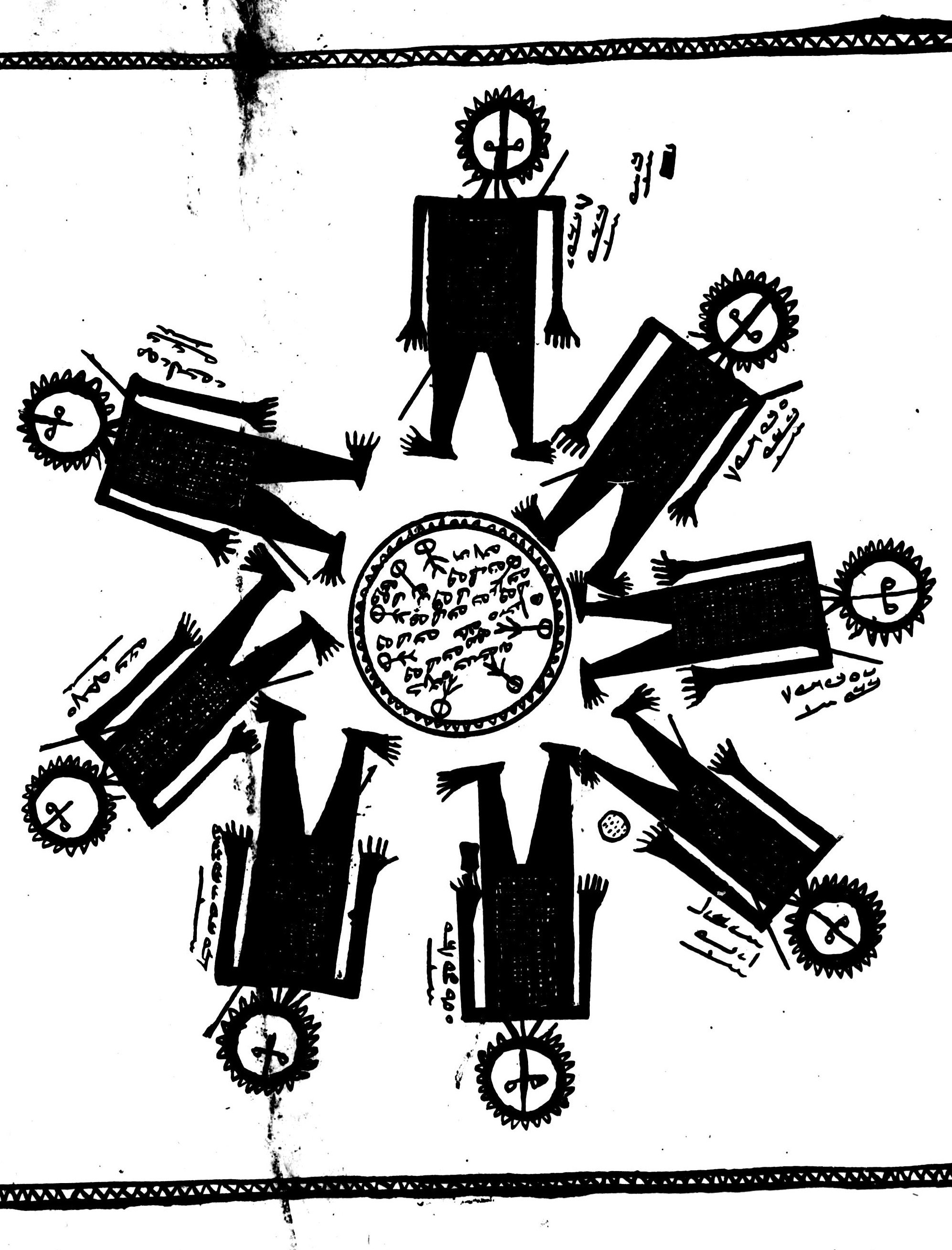

=== Plants ===
Below is an illustration of heavenly garden with trees and plants in Zihrun Raza Kasia (DC 27). All plant names are masculine except for šušmia (sesame) and hiṭia (wheat), which are feminine [fem.]. Various kinds of plants are depicted: the date palm, fig, grape, myrtle, olive, pomegranate, quince, sesame, walnut, and wheat, along with incense.

- Left column – plants from top to bottom: šušmia [fem.] (sesame), guṭaipa (grape), amuza (walnut), rmana (pomegranate), spargla (quince)
- Middle column – sindirka (date palm tree, label at the bottom); riha (incense, label at the top)
- Right column – plants from top to bottom: ʿlana (tree), hiṭia [fem.] (wheat), zaita (olive), tinta (fig), asa (myrtle)

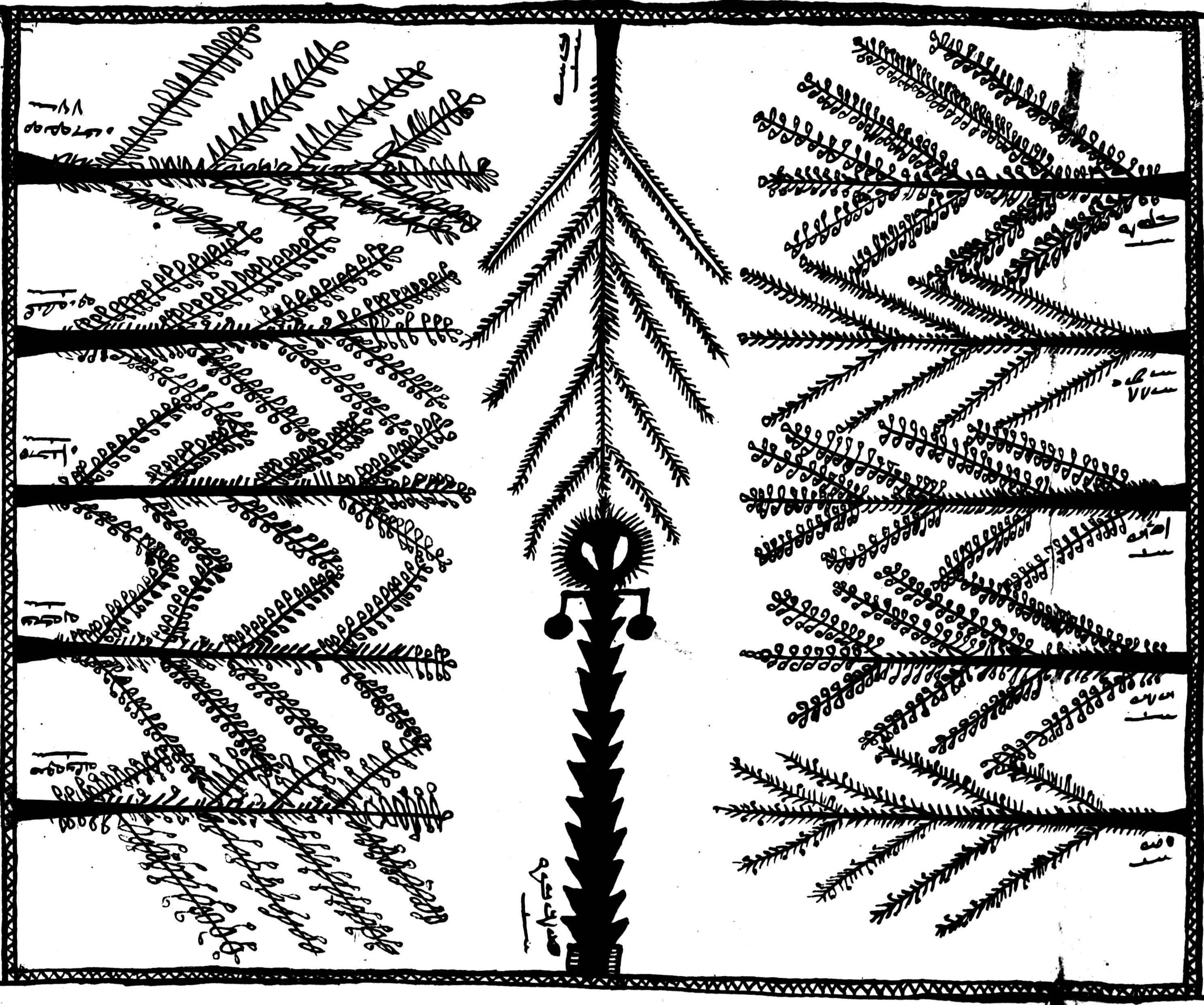

== See also ==
- Scroll of Exalted Kingship
- The Thousand and Twelve Questions
- The Baptism of Hibil Ziwa
