= Rasta (Mandaeism) =

Mandaean ceremonial garment

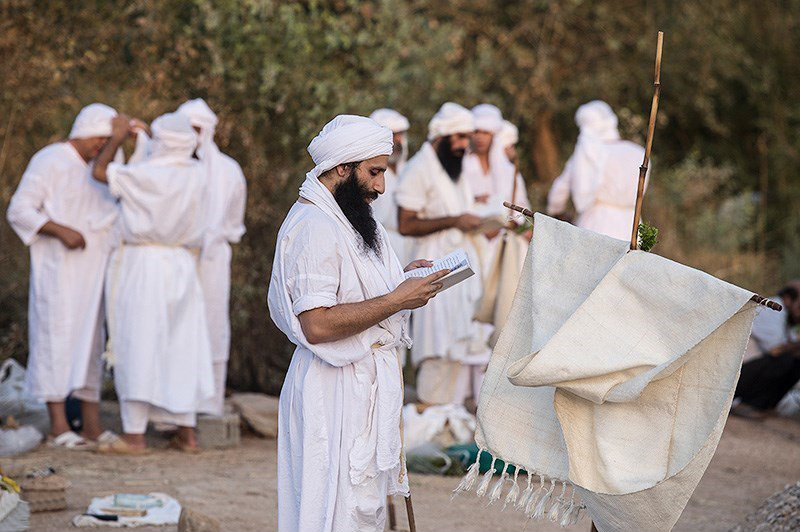
Mandaean men wearing rasta performing masbuta in Ahvaz, Iran

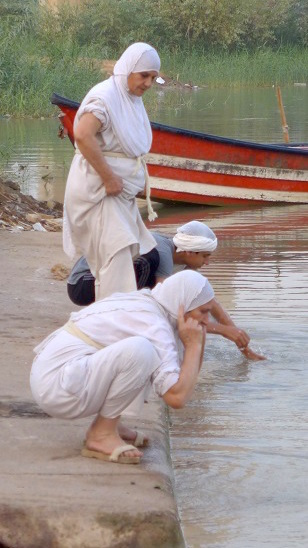
Mandaean women wearing rasta performing Rishama in Ahvaz, Iran in 2013

A rasta (Classical Mandaic: ࡓࡀࡎࡕࡀ) is a white ceremonial garment that Mandaeans wear during most baptismal rites, religious ceremonies, and during periods of uncleanliness. It signifies the purity of the World of Light. The rasta is worn equally by the laypersons and the priests. If a Mandaean dies in clothes other than a rasta, it is believed that they will not reenter the World of Light, unless the rite "Ahaba ḏ-Mania" ('Giving of Garments') can be performed "for those who have died not wearing the ritual garment."

A rasta also has a stitched-on pocket called the daša.

Women also wear a robe (ʿabā) over the rasta during masbuta.

Traditionally, a new rasta is worn for Dehwa Daimana (Dihba ḏ-Iamana ࡃࡉࡄࡁࡀ ࡖࡉࡀࡌࡀࡍࡀ).

== Symbolism ==
The rasta is expected to be transmuted after death into a "garment of glory" for the soul (Qulasta prayer 76: "the Perfecter of Souls ... will come out toward you and clothe your soul in a garment of radiance") – this is equivalent to the perispirit.

A Mandaic hymn, Left Ginza 3.11, states:

"He created me and clothed me with radiance, like that which the chosen men put on.
That which the chosen men put on, the true and faithful people.
I put my head therein, I was filled like the world.
I opened my eyes in it, my eyes became filled with light."

== Related clothing ==
The rasta for Mandaean laypeople consists of the following seven pieces of clothing. It is usually made of cotton or sometimes muslin.

- ksuia or sadra (ࡎࡀࡃࡓࡀ) – long-sleeved tunic with V-neck opening, may extend to the knees
- daša (ࡃࡀࡔࡀ) – two cloth pieces that are stitched on the upper right side of the sadra to make a pocket
- šarwala (ࡔࡀࡓࡅࡀࡋࡀ) – loose trousers, consists of four pieces
- tikta (ࡕࡉࡊࡕࡀ) – drawstring
- burzinqa – turban that is wrapped three times around the head. The loose end is called the rugza (ࡓࡅࡂࡆࡀ). For priests, the rugza can be used to veil the lower face to form a pandama. It is made from a cloth that is 10 cm × 3 m long, and can be cut lengthwise as needed.
- naṣifa (ࡍࡀࡑࡉࡐࡀ) – stole or narrow strip of cloth worn across the neck that is sewn (doubled over) from three sides; one of the long sides is unsewn. It is made from a cloth that is 8 cm × 1.95 m long.
- himiana – belt made of wool that has a sewn and unsewn end. The sewn end, in the form of a loop, is called the arwa (ࡀࡓࡅࡀ). The unsewn end, resembling a tassel, is called the karkuša (ࡊࡀࡓࡊࡅࡔࡀ).

In addition, priests also wear:

- taga – silk crown
- šum Yawar Ziwa (ࡎࡅࡌ ࡉࡀࡅࡀࡓ ࡆࡉࡅࡀ) – sacred gold ring
- margna – staff made from an olive branch

Special prayers in the Qulasta are also recited when putting on the burzinqa and pandama.

The šiala is a burzinqa that is draped over women's heads.

== See also ==
- Baptismal clothing
- Burzinqa
- Pandama
- Himiana
- Drabsha
- Mandaean cosmology
- Masbuta
- Masiqta
- Parwanaya
