= SA =

Sa, SA, S.A. or s.a. may refer to:

== Arts, media and entertainment ==
=== Music ===
- Initialism for "soprano and alto", voice types for which a piece of music is written
- SA (Samurai Attack), a Japanese punk rock band
- SA Martinez, a vocalist and DJ for the band 311
- Soziedad Alkoholika, a Spanish punk rock band
- SA, a 2018 album by Jonathan Richman
- Strike Anywhere, a hardcore punk band from Richmond, Virginia

=== Other media ===
- Sa (film), a 2016 Indian film
- S.A (manga), a manga series by Maki Minami
- Something Awful, a comedy website
- Star Awards, an annual Singaporean television award ceremony
- Subterranean Animism, a video game from the Touhou series by ZUN
- Siragadikka Aasai (TV series), an Indian TV series

== Language and writing ==
=== Characters and glyphs ===
- Sa (cuneiform), a cuneiform sign
- Sa (hieroglyph), an Egyptian hieroglyph meaning "protection"
- Sa (Javanese) (ꦱ), a character in the Javanese script
- Sa (kana) (さ and サ), characters (kana) in the two Japanese syllabaries

=== Languages ===
- Saa language, spoken in Vanuatu
- Sanskrit (ISO 639-1 code: sa), an Indo-Aryan language, and the liturgical language of Hinduism

== Businesses and organizations ==
=== Types of corporation ===
- S.A. (corporation) (French: Société Anonyme) a type of joint-stock company in civil law countries
  - Spółka Aukcyjna ("Joint-stock company" in Polish)

=== Military and paramilitary organizations ===
- Soviet Army, army of the Soviet Union
- Sturmabteilung (SA), a paramilitary wing of the German Nazi Party (NSDAP), also known as the Brownshirts

=== Political organisations ===
- Socialist Action (disambiguation), several organisations
- Socialist Alliance (Australia), a Socialist political party
- Socialist Alternative (Australia), a Marxist political organisation

=== Other businesses and organizations ===
- System Architect, an enterprise architecture product
- San Antonio Spurs, a basketball team in the U.S. National Basketball Association
- The Salvation Army, an international church and charity
- Sexaholics Anonymous, a sex-addiction recovery group based on the 12 steps of Alcoholics Anonymous
- Scouting America, main scouting movement in the US, formerly Boy Scouts of America
- Shooting Australia, governing body for target shooting sports in Australia
- Smokers Anonymous
- South African Airways (IATA airline designator: SA)
- Sports Authority, a defunct U.S. sporting goods retailer
- Success Academy Charter Schools, term commonly abbreviated to 'Success Academy'

== Job titles ==
- Seaman apprentice, a U.S. Navy and Coast Guard rank
- Software architect
- Special agent, a position usually held by investigative officers within certain law enforcement agencies in the US
- System administrator, in information technology
- Systems analyst, in information technology

== Places ==
- SA postcode area, a group of postal districts near Swansea, Wales, UK
- Province of Salerno, Italy, by vehicle registration plate code
- Sakha Republic, a federal Russian republic
- Saline County, Kansas, U.S.
- San Antonio, Texas, U.S.
- Sarajevo (official city abbreviation)
- Saudi Arabia (two-letter country code)
- South Asia
- South Africa
- South America
- South Australia

== Science, technology, and mathematics ==
=== Biology and medicine ===
- Salicylic acid, a plant hormone
- Spontaneous abortion
- Sustained action, a longer-acting form of a medication
- Sense of agency

=== Computing and telecommunications ===
- .sa, the country code top level domain (ccTLD) for Saudi Arabia
- Security association, in the IPsec networking protocol
- Selective availability, a mechanism for degrading the precision of the civilian GPS network
- Simulated annealing, an optimisation technique
- Software architecture
- Microsoft Software Assurance
- Something Awful, American comedy website founded in 1999
- Spatial architecture, a computer architecture parallelizing kernels across many processing elements
- Standalone mode, in 5G cellular telecoms; see 5G NR § Standalone mode
- Structured analysis, a software engineering technique
- Suffix array, a sorted array of all suffixes of a string
- System architecture
- Systems analysis
- System agent

=== Other uses in science, technology, and mathematics ===
- Sa (Islamic measure), Arabic measure of volume
- Samarium (former chemical symbol: Sa), a rare earth metal
- Single action, a type of firearm trigger
- Situation awareness, a component of aviation safety and other socio-technical systems
- Spectral acceleration, in seismology and earthquake engineering
- Superabundant number, a type of number (mathematical concept)
- Surface area
- Unbarred spiral galaxy
- Short axis, in single-photon emission computed tomography

== Other uses ==
- Sa (Mandaeism), a type of Mandaean sacramental bread that is rolled up
- Sine anno, Latin term for 'without year' used in bibliographies to indicate items which do not record the year of publication
- Sub anno (s.a. or sa), Latin term for 'under the year' in annals which record by year
- Simple asphyxiant, encoded on NFPA 704 as SA
- Secrecy agreement, a legal contract for confidentiality
- Sex appeal, attraction on the basis of sexual desire
- Sexual assault, the intentional act of sexually touching another person without their consent
- Sexual abuse, act of abusing someone sexually
- The ShareAlike condition of Creative Commons licenses
- Second Amendment (disambiguation) to the constitutions of several sovereign states and subnational entities
  - Second Amendment to the United States Constitution, the most common meaning of "Second Amendment"
- Single adult (LDS Church), a designation in The Church of Jesus Christ of Latter-day Saints for unmarried individuals 18 and older; sometimes used specifically to refer to unmarried individuals over 30
- San Andreas (disambiguation)
- MG SA, a sporting saloon
- Saturday

== See also ==
- S+A, defunct Philippine TV network
- Sá, a Portuguese surname
- Sa (萨), a rare Chinese surname of Semu origin (see 雁门萨氏)
- Semi-automatic (disambiguation)
