= Ṣa =

Ṣa may refer to:

- Ṣa (Indic), a consonantal letter in Indic scripts
- Sa (Mandaeism), a type of Mandaean sacramental bread that is rolled up

== See also ==
- SA (disambiguation)
