= Yesseus Mazareus Yessedekeus =

Personification of the Living Water in Sethian Gnosticism

In Sethian Gnostic texts, Yesseus Mazareus Yessedekeus is the personification of the Living Water. He is mentioned in the Nag Hammadi tractates of the Holy Book of the Great Invisible Spirit, Zostrianos, and Apocalypse of Adam.

== Etymology ==
Meyer (2007) gives the etymology of the Yesseus Mazareus Yessedekeus as follows.

- Yesseus from Jesus
- Mazareus from Nazarene (Greek: nazōraios)
- Yessedekeus from "the righteous" (Greek: ho dikaios)

In contrast, Lofts (2010) connects Mazareus with Mazzaroth and considers Yessedekeus to be cognate with Sadducee, in turn derived from Yu/Yu (an epithet for the divine) and the root צָדַק, ṣāḏaq (to be right, just). Lofts also propose that the name Yessedekeus is also found in Mandaeism in the form of Yuzaṭaq, an epithet for Manda d-Hayyi.

== Parallels in Mandaeism ==
In Mandaeism, the uthra (celestial spirit) Piriawis Ziwa is the personification of the heavenly river of living water. Qulasta prayers 13 and 17 mention Piriawis Ziwa and Piriafil Malaka together as uthras.

In Mandaean scriptures such as the Ginza Rabba, Praš Ziwa (pronounced Fraš Ziwa) is mentioned as the personification of the Euphrates, which is considered to be the earthly manifestation of the heavenly yardna or flowing river (similar to the Yazidi concept of Lalish being the earthly manifestation of its heavenly counterpart).

== See also ==
- Five Seals
- Micheus, Michar, and Mnesinous
- Piriawis
- Jesus in Manichaeism
- Mandaean priests, who are referred to as Nasoraeans (Nazarenes)
- Water of Life (Christianity)
- Living Water
