= Hamra (Mandaeism) =

Sacramental raisin water in the Mandaean religion

In Mandaeism, hamra (Classical Mandaic: ࡄࡀࡌࡓࡀ) is sacramental water mixed with raisins that have been macerated (i.e., softened via soaking). Although it is often translated as "wine" (its Semitic etymological source) or "grape juice," hamra used in Mandaean rituals is non-alcoholic, and it is also not freshly pressed grape juice. It is used during wedding and masiqta rituals.

The hamra can be served in a kapta, a shallow brass drinking bowl that is 11 inches or less in perimeter, or in a qanina (small glass bottle).

== Symbolism ==
Jorunn Jacobsen Buckley notes that the bowl of hamra is symbolic of the womb, with the hamra itself representing blood. Near the start of the masiqta ritual, the hamra is prepared by kneading the raisins until the water darkens. During the process of the ritual, fragments of faṭira (representing the substance of the ancestors which the deceased aims to join) and a piece of pigeon meat are folded in unbaked pihta (representing the soul). Water is mingled with the hamra, symbolising fertilisation, prior to the priest dipping the pihta and fragments and placing them in his mouth, representing the incubation of the lightworld body of the deceased.

== See also ==
- Eucharist
- Mambuha
- Halalta
- Holy water
