= Siniawis =

River in the underworld of Mandaeism

In Mandaean cosmology, Siniawis (Classical Mandaic: ࡎࡉࡍࡉࡀࡅࡉࡎ) is a region in the World of Darkness (alma ḏ-hšuka) or underworld. It is described as "the lower earth of the darkness" (arqa titaita ḏ-hšuka) in Chapter 1 of Book 5 in the Right Ginza.

== See also ==
- Piriawis, its corresponding opposite in the World of Light
