= Himiana =

Mandaean ritual girdle

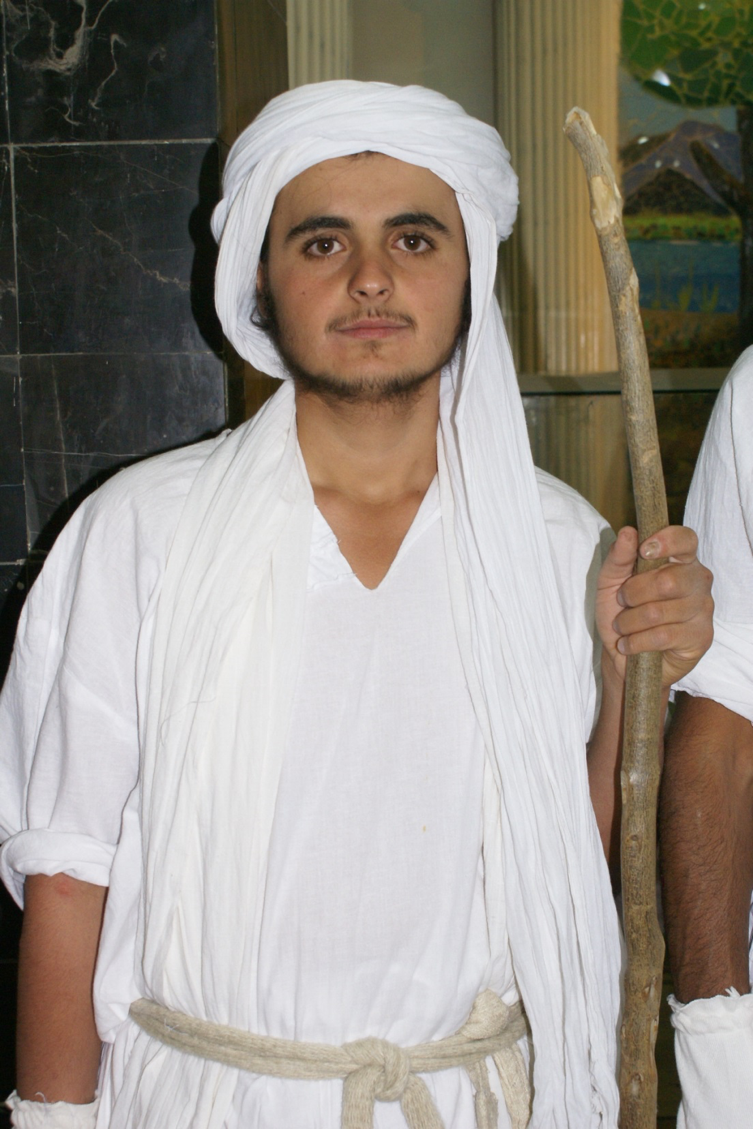
- A Mandaean priestly initiate wearing the himiana (bottom)
- Type: girdle or belt
- Material: wool
- Place of origin: southern Iraq and southwestern Iran

The himiana (Classical Mandaic: ࡄࡉࡌࡉࡀࡍࡀ; modern Mandaic pronunciation: hemyanā) is a sacred ritual girdle or belt used by the Mandaeans. Traditionally, it is white, tubular, and made of wool.

== Etymology ==
Himiana is a Persian loanword, like burzinqa (turban) and margna (staff).

== Description ==
Unlike the Zoroastrian kushti, which is made of 72 threads, the Mandaean himiana is made of 60 woolen threads.

The himiana has a sewn end and an unsewn end. The sewn end, in the form of a loop, is called the arwa (ࡀࡓࡅࡀ). The unsewn end, resembling a tassel, is called the karkuša (ࡊࡀࡓࡊࡅࡔࡀ).

== Prayer ==
According to Drower (1937), the following prayer is recited when a lay Mandaean puts on the himiana.

Mandaic transliteration

himiana ʿtriṣ
b-trin ṭabia
b-trin gaṭria

English translation

I consecrate the girdle
With two virtues
With two knots.

== See also ==
- Kushti
- Zunnar
- Girdle
- Zone (vestment)
