= Piriawis =

Heavenly river in Mandaeism

In Mandaean cosmology, Piriawis (Classical Mandaic: ࡐࡉࡓࡉࡀࡅࡉࡎ, Modern Mandaic pronunciation: [piriˈawis]; sometimes also spelled Biriawiš ࡁࡉࡓࡉࡀࡅࡉࡔ), also known as the Yardena Rabba (Classical Mandaic: ࡉࡀࡓࡃࡍࡀ ࡓࡁࡀ, romanized: Yardna Rba "Great Jordan"), is the sacred life-giving river (yardna) of the World of Light. It is the heavenly counterpart of rivers on Earth (Tibil), which are considered by Mandaeans to be manifestations of the heavenly Piriawis.

Shilmai and Nidbai are the two guardian uthras (celestial beings) watching over Piriawis.

Qulasta prayers 13 and 17 mention Piriawis-Ziwa and Piriafil-Malaka together as uthras.

== Etymology ==
Drower & Macúch (1963) consider the name Piriawis to be of Iranian origin, literally meaning 'full of water' (cf. modern Persian پر آب).

== Other names ==
In Book 4 of the Right Ginza, Sindiriawis is mentioned as "the great yardna of the Life" (sindiriauis, iardna rba ḏ-hiia).

== See also ==
- Yardna
- Ganga (goddess) in Hinduism
- Siniawis, its corresponding opposite in the World of Darkness
- Jordan River
- Yesseus Mazareus Yessedekeus, the name of the Living Water in Sethianism
