= Sacramental bread =

Bread used in the Christian Eucharist ritual

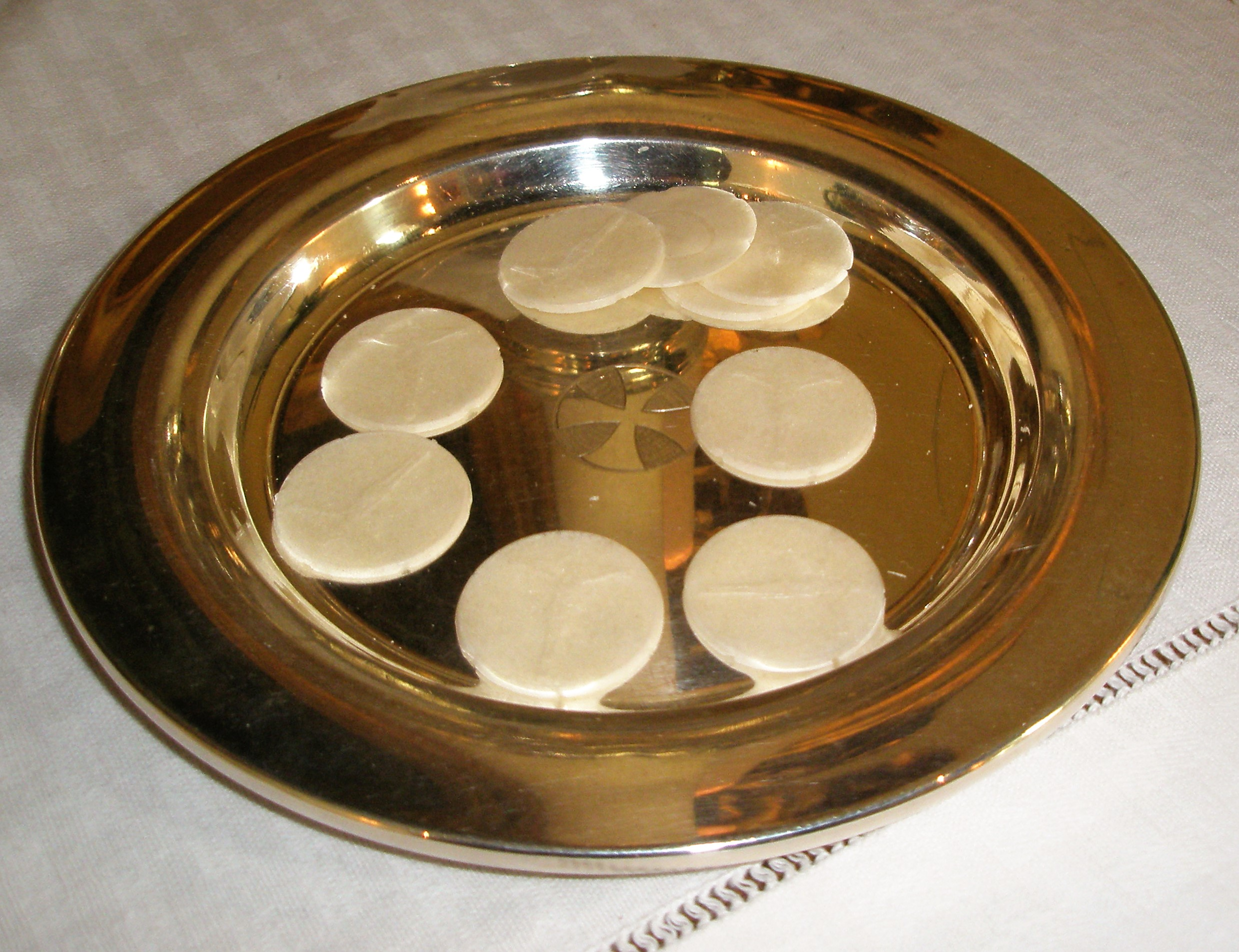
Unleavened hosts on a paten

Sacramental bread, also called Communion bread, Communion wafer, Sacred host, Eucharistic bread, the Lamb or simply the host (Latin: hostia, lit. 'sacrificial victim'), is the bread used in the Christian ritual of the Eucharist and the body of Christ. Along with sacramental wine, it is one of two elements of the Eucharist. The bread may be either leavened or unleavened, depending on tradition.

Catholic theology generally teaches that at the Words of Institution the bread's substance is changed into the Body of Christ, a process known as transubstantiation. Conversely, Eastern Christian theology generally views the epiclesis as the point at which the change occurs.

== Christianity ==
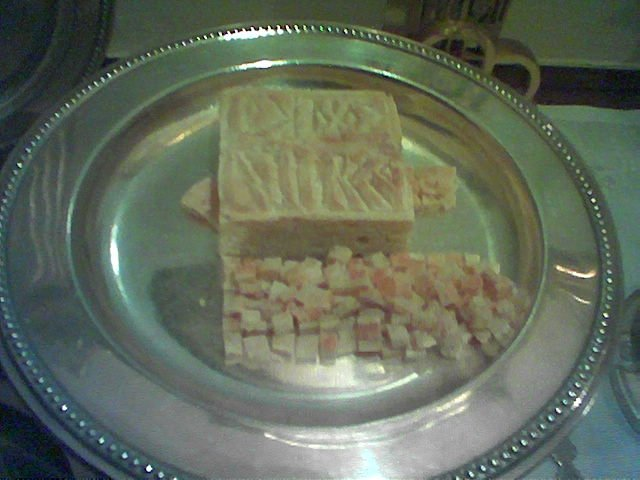
The Lamb and particles placed on the diskos during the Liturgy of Preparation for the Divine Liturgy

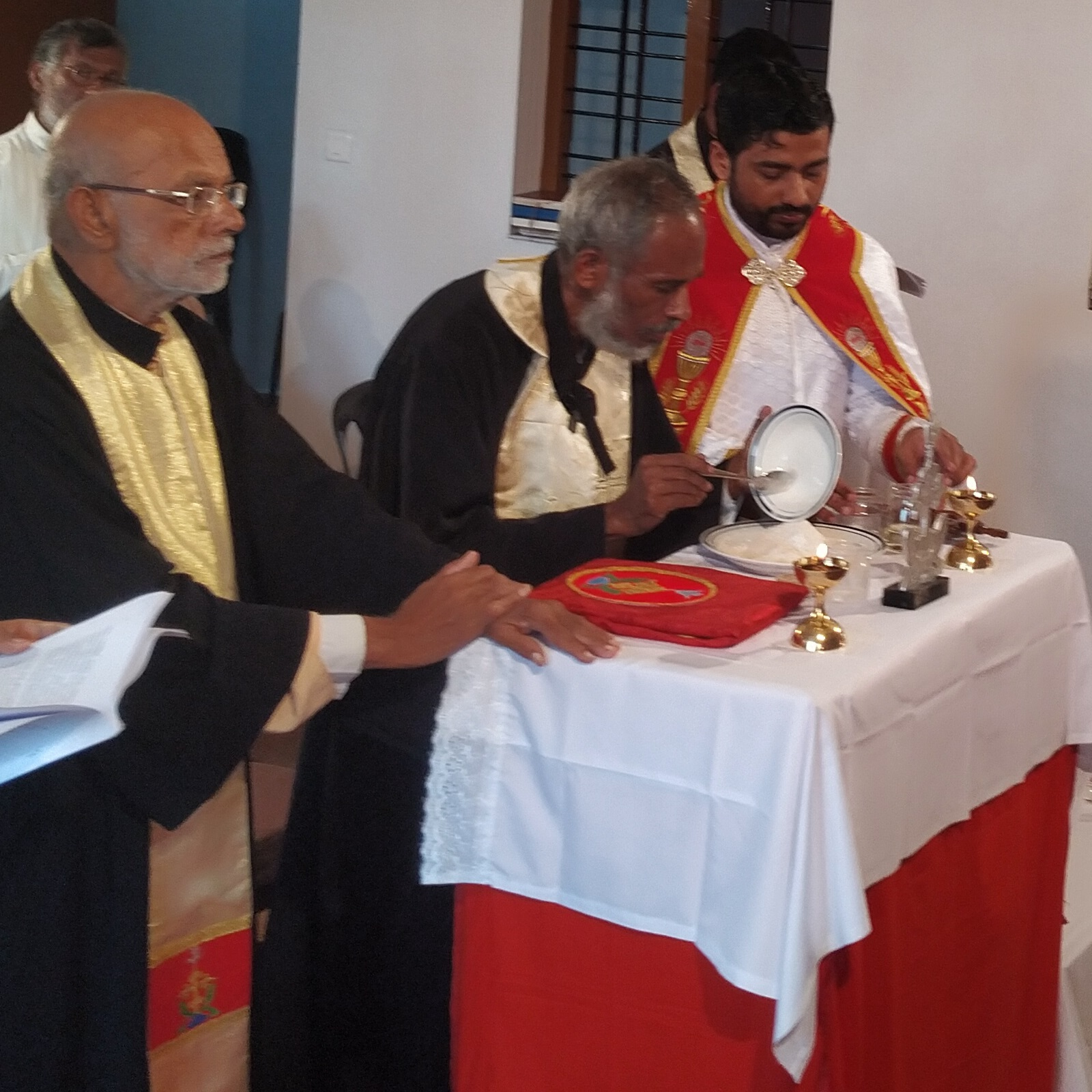
Rite of Renewal of Holy Leaven in the Syro-Malabar Church

=== Etymology of host ===
The word host is derived from the Latin hostia, which means 'sacrificial victim'. The term can be used to describe the bread both before and after consecration, although it is more correct to use it after consecration.

=== Eastern traditions ===
Many Eastern-rite churches use leavened bread for the Eucharist. Thus, the sacramental bread is the Resurrected Christ. The host, known as prosphorá or a πρόσφορον (prósphoron, 'offering') may be made out of only four ingredients: fine (white) wheat flour, pure water, yeast, and salt. Sometimes holy water will be either sprinkled into the dough or on the kneading trough at the beginning of the process.

==== Armenian rite ====
Because leaven is symbolic of sin, the Armenian Catholic Church and the Armenian Apostolic Orthodox Church traditionally offer unleavened bread (although it is distinctively different from the kind used by the Catholic Church) to symbolize the sinlessness of Christ.

==== Eastern Orthodox Churches ====
The baking may only be performed by a believing Orthodox Christian in good standing, having preferably been recently to Confession, and is accompanied by prayer and fasting. Before baking, each loaf is formed by placing two disks of dough, one on top of the other, and stamping it with a special liturgical seal. The prosphora should be fresh and not stale or moldy when presented at the altar for use in the Divine Liturgy.

Often several prosphora will be baked and offered by the faithful, and the priest chooses the best one for the Lamb (Host) that will be consecrated. The remaining loaves are blessed and offered back to the congregation after the end of the Divine Liturgy (Eucharist); this bread is called the antidoron (αντίδωρον, antídōron), i.e. a 'gift returned', or 'in place of the gifts'.

=== Western traditions ===
A host is a portion of bread used for Holy Communion in many Christian churches. In Western Christianity the host is often thin, round, unleavened hosts.

==== Catholic Church ====
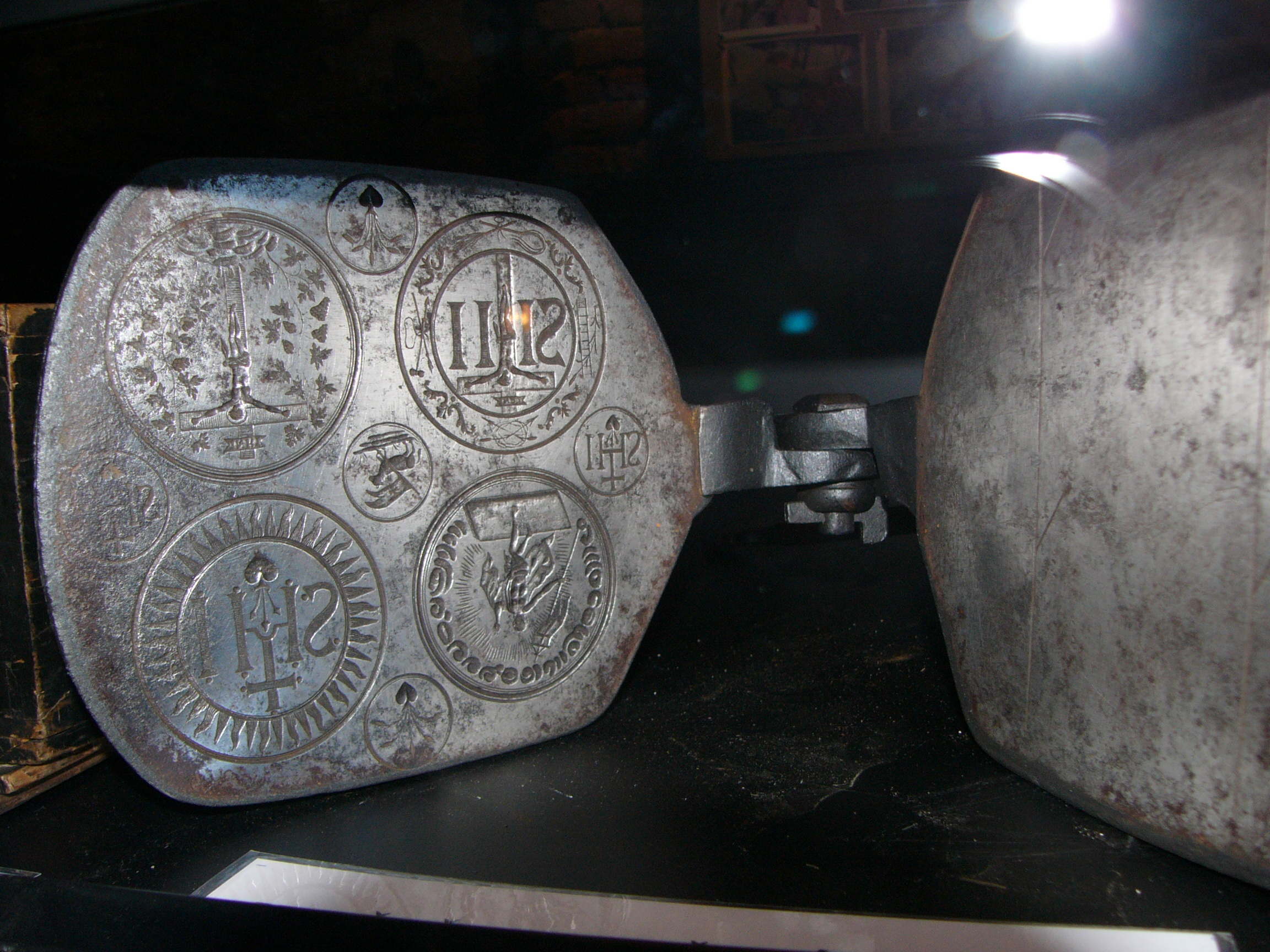
Detail of tongs for baking hosts

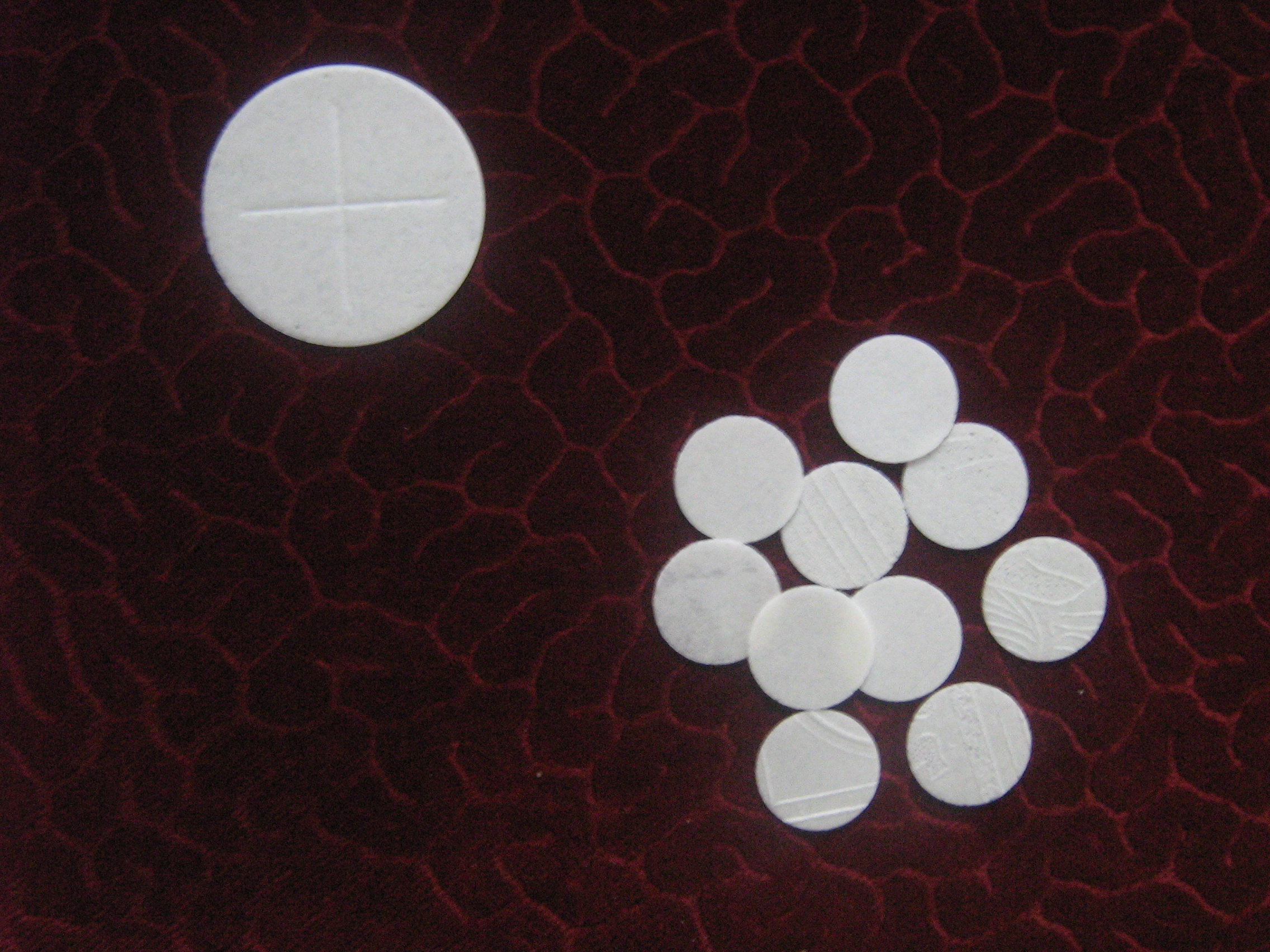
Catholic unleavened hosts of differing sizes

In the Roman Rite, unleavened bread is used as in the Jewish Passover or Feast of Unleavened Bread. The Code of Canon Law for the Latin Church requires that the hosts be made from wheat flour and water only, and recently made so that there is no danger of spoiling.

Hosts are often made by nuns as a means of supporting their religious communities. However, in New Zealand, the St Vincent de Paul Society hires individuals with intellectual disabilities to bake, cut out, and sort the bread, thereby offering paid employment to those who would not otherwise have that option.

The General Instruction of the Roman Missal §321 recommends that "the eucharistic bread [...] be made in such a way that the priest at Mass with a congregation is able in practice to break it into parts for distribution to at least some of the faithful. [...] The action of the fraction (breaking of bread), which gave its name to the Eucharist in apostolic times, will bring out more clearly the force and importance of the sign of unity of all in the one bread, and of the sign of charity by the fact that the one bread is distributed among the brothers and sisters."

In 1995 Cardinal Joseph Ratzinger (the future Pope Benedict XVI), then Prefect of the Congregation for the Doctrine of the Faith, wrote a letter to the Episcopal Conferences in which he expanded the Code of Canon Law, stating that low-gluten bread would be considered "valid matter" for hosts as long as no additional substances "alter[ed] the nature of the substance of the bread". Since the 2000s, hosts with low gluten content have been manufactured in the United States, especially in parts of Missouri and New York. People with celiac disease must follow a strict gluten-free diet and maintain it for life to allow the recovery of the intestinal mucosa and reduce the risk of developing severe health complications.

In the Catholic Church the Tree of Life in Book of Revelation verse 2:7 is the Eucharist.

===== Eastern Catholic Churches =====
The Byzantine Rite Eastern Catholic Churches (like the Eastern Orthodox Church) use leavened bread for the prosphora.

The Maronite Church has adopted the use of unleavened bread due to liturgical Latinisation. The Syro-Malabar Church uses both unleavened bread as well as leavened bread to which Holy Malka is added.

==== Lutheran churches ====
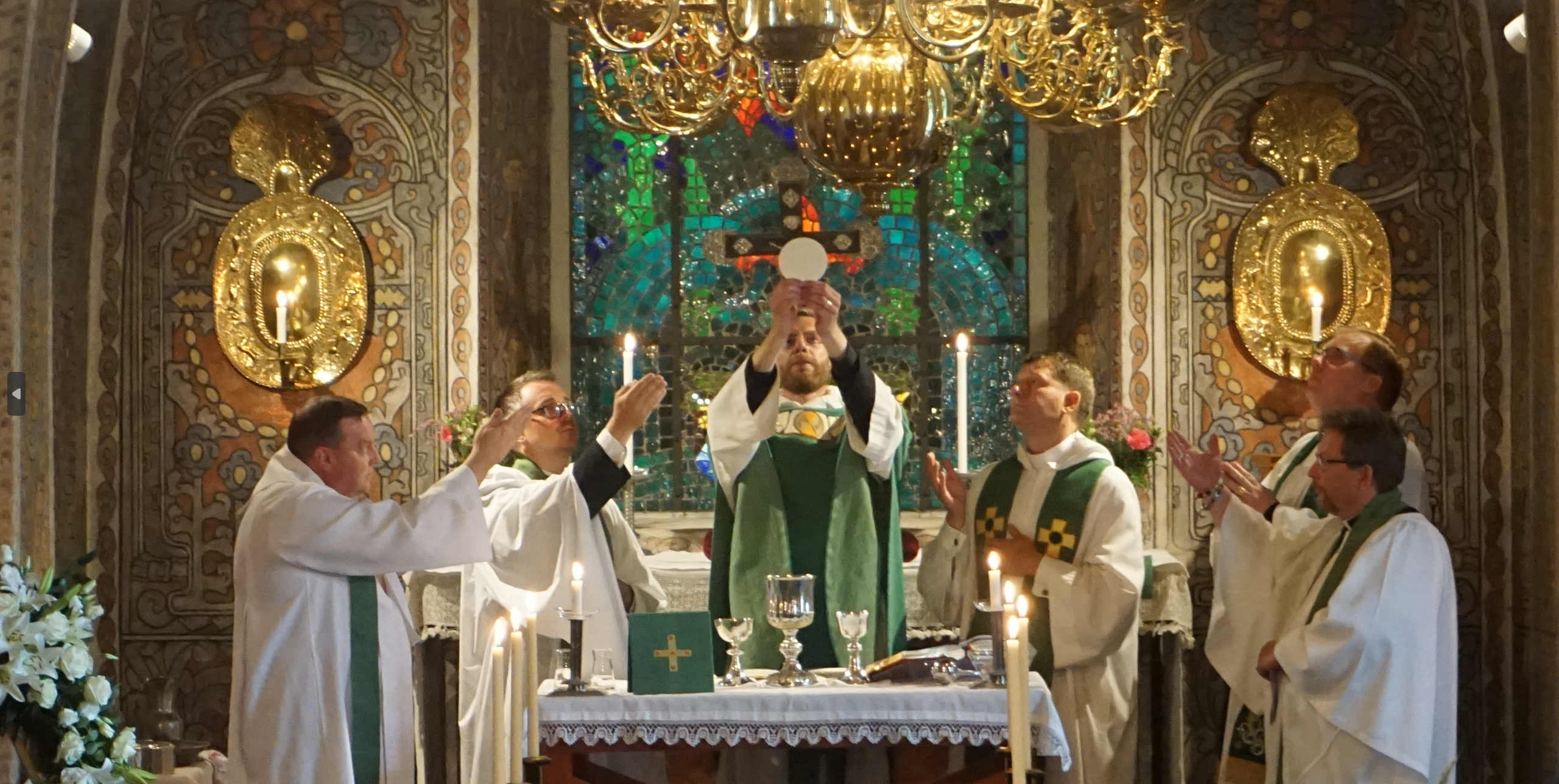
Lutheran priest elevating the host during the Mass at Alsike Church, Sweden

In the Lutheran churches that use the Western Rite, unleavened bread is typically used (as in the Jewish Passover); these are called hosts. Hosts are made by a number of Lutheran religious orders, as well as monks and nuns, to support their religious communities. Lutheran seminaries and religious goods stores, such as the Concordia Publishing House, make hosts as well. Hosts often contain a cross, crucifix or IHS Christogram on them.

===== Eastern Lutheran churches =====
The Eastern Lutheran churches, which employ the Byzantine Rite, use leavened bread for the prosphora (the Greek word for Eucharistic altar bread).

==== Other ====
In the varying Protestant denominations, there is a wide variety of practices concerning the sacramental bread used. Anglicans vary by the churchmanship of the congregation where many will use leavened breads while others—much like Roman Catholics and Lutherans—use unleavened bread. Reformed Christians use rolls which are broken and distributed to the faithful.

The Christian Congregation, a Pentecostal denomination, uses leavened loaves of bread. Among those who use the unleavened hosts, there is a great deal of variation: some are square or triangular rather than round, and may even be made out of whole wheat flour.

Some, such as the Churches of Christ, use matzo.

== Latter-day Saints ==
The Church of Jesus Christ of Latter-day Saints has no strict rules on the type of bread used for sacramental purposes. Latter-day Saint scriptures state: "For, behold, I say unto you, that it mattereth not what ye shall eat or what ye shall drink when ye partake of the sacrament, if it so be that ye do it with an eye single to my glory—remembering unto the Father my body which was laid down for you, and my blood which was shed for the remission of your sins." (Doctrine and Covenants 27:2) Different congregations may use either commercial bread or homemade bread prepared by members of the congregation. It is permissible to substitute rice cakes or other gluten-free breads for members who suffer from food allergies. The bread is broken into fragments just prior to being blessed by one of the officiating priests.

== Mandaeism ==
In Mandaeism, the pihta (Classical Mandaic: ࡐࡉࡄࡕࡀ, lit. 'opened; something broken apart or into pieces') is a type of sacramental bread used with rituals performed by Mandaean priests. It is a small, round, biscuit-sized flatbread that can either be salted or saltless, depending on whether the ritual use of the pihta is for living or dead people.

The pihta is not to be confused with the faṭira, a small, round, saltless, half-baked biscuit also used in Mandaean rituals.

Every Sunday, Mandaeans participate in a baptismal mass (maṣbuta) involving immersion in flowing water (yardna) by ordained priests. The baptized then consume pieces of salted pihta blessed by a priest in order to restore their connections (laufa) with the World of Light (see Mandaean cosmology).

== See also ==
- Eucharistic miracle
- Host desecration
- Prosphora
