= Living Water =

Biblical term

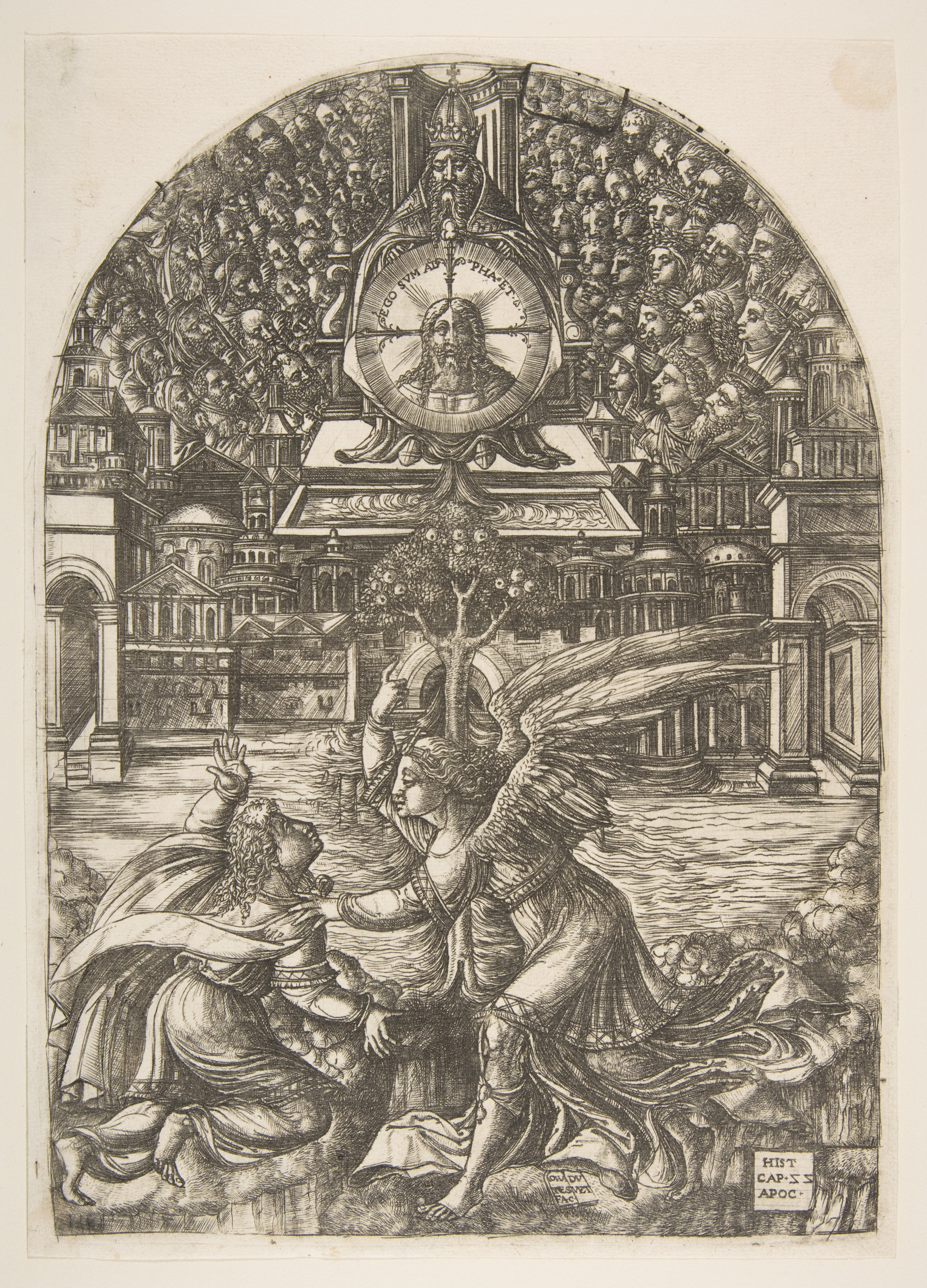
The Angel shows Saint John the Fountain of Living Water, from the Apocalypse (Jean Duvet, 16th century)

Living water (Hebrew: מַֽיִם־חַיִּ֖ים, romanized: mayim-ḥayyim; Greek: ὕδωρ ζῶν, romanized: hydōr zōn) is a biblical term which appears in both the Old and New Testaments.

== Old Testament ==
In Jeremiah 2:13 and 17:13, the prophet describes God as "the spring of living water", who has been forsaken by his chosen people Israel. Later, the prophet Zechariah described Jerusalem as a source of "living water", "half [flowing] east to the Dead Sea and half of it west to the Mediterranean Sea, in summer and in winter" (Zechariah 14:8). The Pulpit Commentary notes that the city of Jerusalem "was, as we know, abundantly supplied with water by many conduits and subterranean channels; but standing, as it does, surrounded by hills higher than itself, it is physically impossible that the waters could literally flow as stated. The description is symbolical …" However, this does not take into the account the various topological changes prophesied in the previous verses, such as Zechariah 14:4: "On that day His feet shall stand on the Mount of Olives that lies before Jerusalem on the east, and the Mount of Olives shall be split in two from east to west by a very wide valley, so that one half of the Mount shall move northward, and the other half southward."

== New Testament ==
In John's Gospel, the phrase is attributed to Jesus speaking with the Samaritan woman whom he meets at Jacob's Well in Sychar:

"If you knew the gift of God and who it is that asks you for a drink, you would have asked him and he would have given you living water".

The woman asks where she can find this living water, and Jesus answers that he is its spring.

== In Gnosticism ==
In the Sethian Gnostic text Zostrianos, the Living Water is personified with the name Yesseus Mazareus Yessedekeus.

== In Mandaeism ==
In Mandaeism, living water (fresh, natural, flowing water; Classical Mandaic: ࡌࡉࡀ ࡄࡉࡉࡀ, romanized: mia hiia; pronounced meyyā heyyī in Modern Mandaic) is a requirement for baptism (maṣbuta), and therefore can only take place in rivers called yardna.

== See also ==
- Water of Life (Christianity)
- Living Waters (disambiguation)
- Yardna in Mandaeism
- Masbuta in Mandaeism
- Five Seals in Sethianism, in which five baptisms are performed in living water
