= Xroshtag and Padvaxtag =

Pair of Manichaean divinities

- Call and Answer
- Other names: Syriac qāryā (call) and ʿanyā (answer); Middle Persian xwandag, mizdagtāzyazad (call) and azdegar yazad (answer); Arabic al-ṣawt (call)

Xrôshtag and Padvâxtag (Parthian: Xrōštag and Padvāxtag) are a pair of Manichaean divinities, always depicted together, who serve as the personifications of the words "call" and "answer". The call is uttered from above by the Living Spirit (Parth. wād žīwandag, Mid. Pers. wāxš zīndag, Syr. rūḥā ḥayyā, Lat. spiritus vivens, Ar. rūḥ al-ḥayāt), and is answered from below by the man who wishes to be saved.

== Theology ==
In Manichaean cosmology, The "Call" issued by Xrōštag represents the salvific initiative of the Living Spirit—a divine entity sent to rescue the trapped light in the material world—reaching out to the soul with an invitation toward redemption. This divine act reflects a core dualistic principle in Manichaean doctrine: the divine Light actively seeks to awaken the imprisoned soul in Darkness through spiritual messaging. Xrōštag in this nature is a hypostatic figure, indicating that the divine intention to save is a constant presence in the cosmological structure.

The "Answer" in this dynamic thus symbolizes the awakening of gnosis in the believer—the recognition of divine origin and the will to return to it. This reciprocal structure elevates the salvific process to the culimation of a dialogical exchange: salvation here, in Manichaeism, is not imposed but offered and chosen, reinforcing the faith's emphasis on individual enlightenment and self-realization. The mutual presence of these two divinities in iconography and texts emphasizes the necessary synergy of divine outreach and human assent for liberation from material bondage.

== See also ==
- Shilmai and Nidbai in Mandaeism
- Adathan and Yadathan in Mandaeism
- Shuqamuna and Shumaliya
- List of angels in theology
