= Fatira =

Small sacramental biscuit in Mandaeism

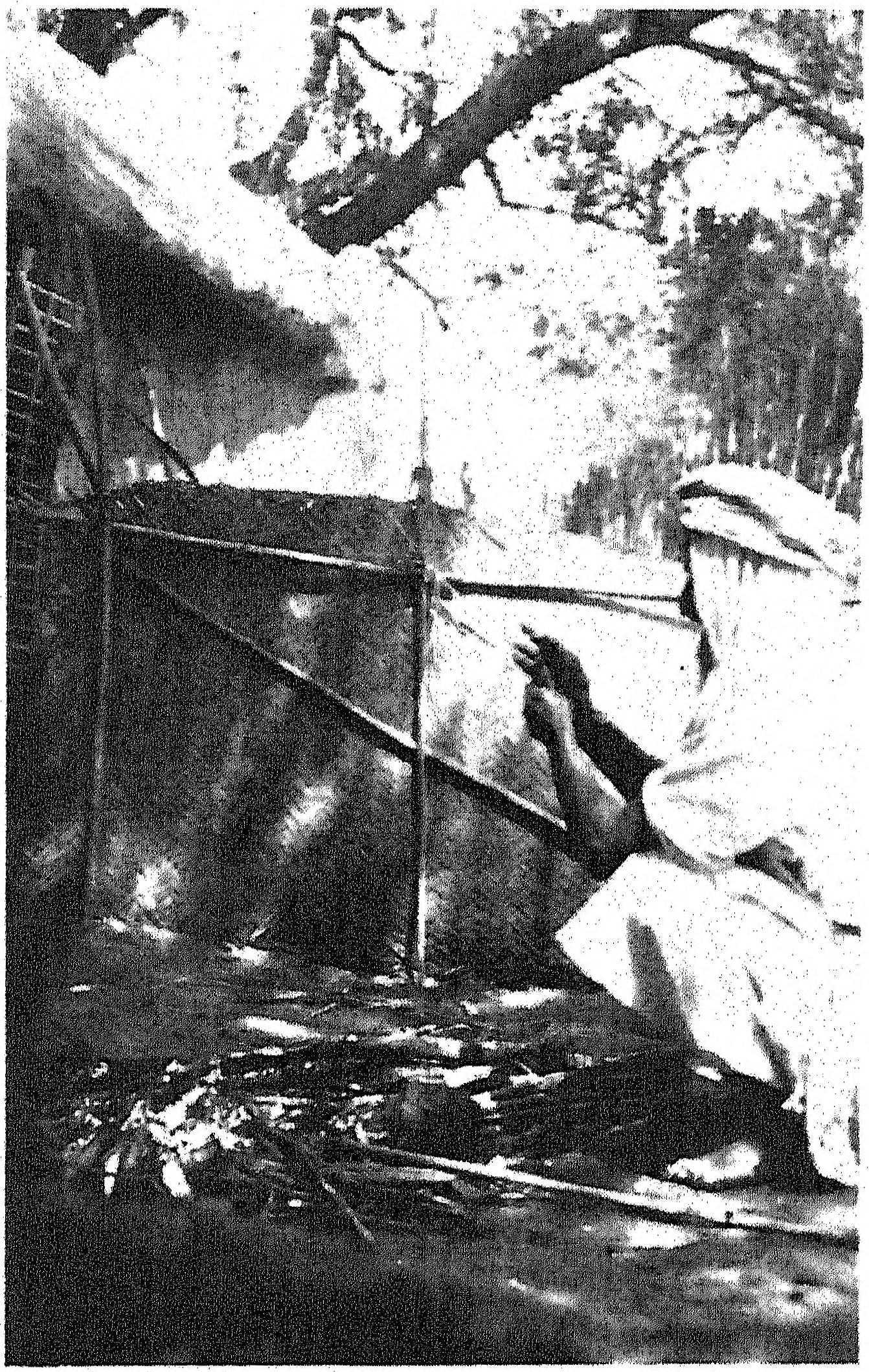
Kneading the dough to make faṭiras during the 1930s in southern Iraq

In Mandaeism, faṭira (Classical Mandaic: ࡐࡀࡈࡉࡓࡀ; plural form: faṭiri[a]) is a small, round, saltless, half-baked biscuit. Faṭiras are used in rituals such as the Ṭabahata Masiqta, or the "masiqta of the Parents," during which they are served in ritual clay trays called ṭariana. The faṭira, which is saltless, is distinct from another type of sacramental bread known as the pihta, which contains salt to symbolize the souls of living people when used for living celebrants, but is saltless like the faṭira when used during masiqta (death mass) rituals.

The qina is a pile of faṭiras where ritual food morsels are placed for use in masiqta rituals.

The ṣa (Classical Mandaic: ࡑࡀ), a rolled-up piece of sacramental flatbread that contains nuts and raisins, is also used in ritual meals for the dead and has a phallic symbolism. It is rolled up like a scroll.

== See also ==
- Sacramental bread
- Pihta
