= Adathan and Yadathan =

Pair of uthras in Mandaeism

- Guardians of the Gate of Life
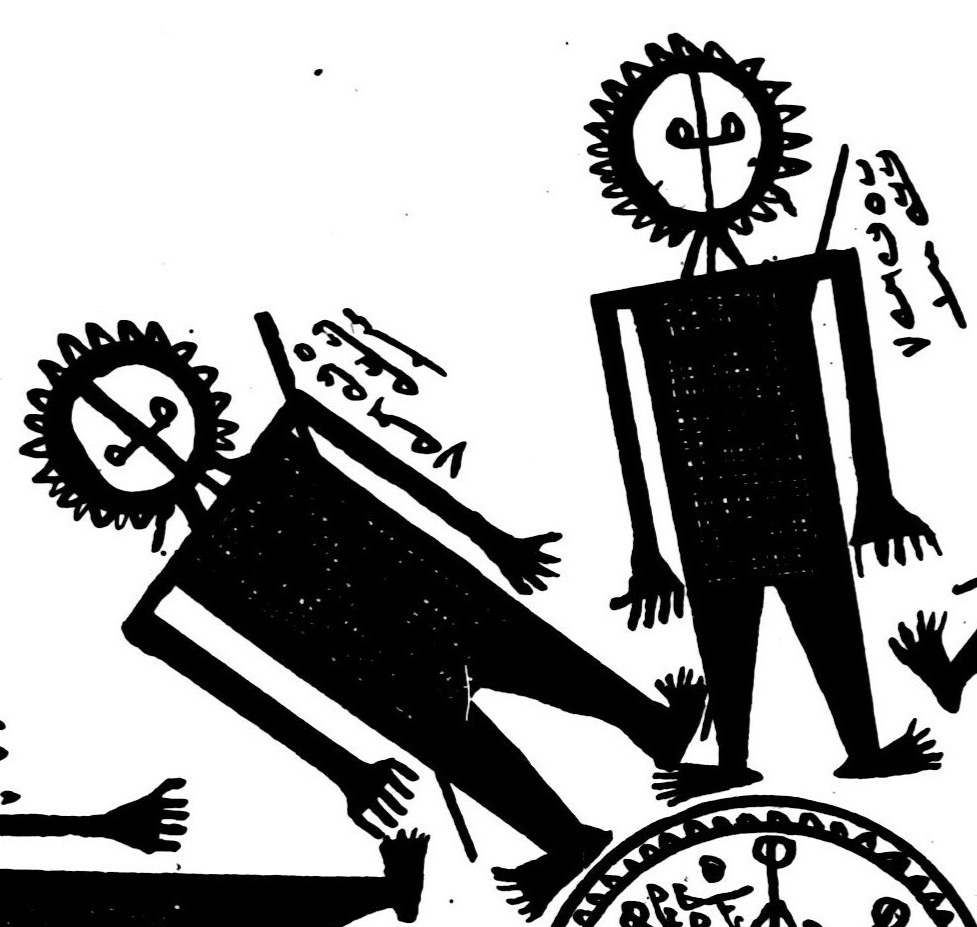
- Adathan and Yadathan (left and right, respectively) in Zihrun Raza Kasia (DC 27)
- Other names: Adatan u-Iadatan
- Abode: World of Light

In Mandaeism, Adathan (Classical Mandaic: ࡀࡃࡀࡕࡀࡍ) and Yadathan (Classical Mandaic: ࡅࡀࡃࡀࡕࡀࡍ) (Modern Mandaic pronunciation: [ɑdɑˈθɑn u jɑdɑˈθɑn]) are a pair of uthras (angel or guardian) who stand at the Gate of Life in the World of Light (Right Ginza 15.8), praising and worshipping Hayyi Rabbi (Qulasta prayer 77). In the Ginza Rabba and Qulasta, they are always mentioned together. Book 14 of the Right Ginza mentions Adathan and Yadathan as the guardians of the "first river" (yardna qadmayya).

Along with Shilmai and Nidbai, Adathan and Yadathan are among the most frequently invoked uthras in Mandaean prayers, such as in the Asut Malkia. In Mandaean texts and prayers, Adathan and Yadathan are always mentioned together.

== See also ==
- Shilmai and Nidbai
- Xroshtag and Padvaxtag in Manichaeism
- Shuqamuna and Shumaliya
- List of angels in theology
