= Pihta =

Mandaean sacramental bread

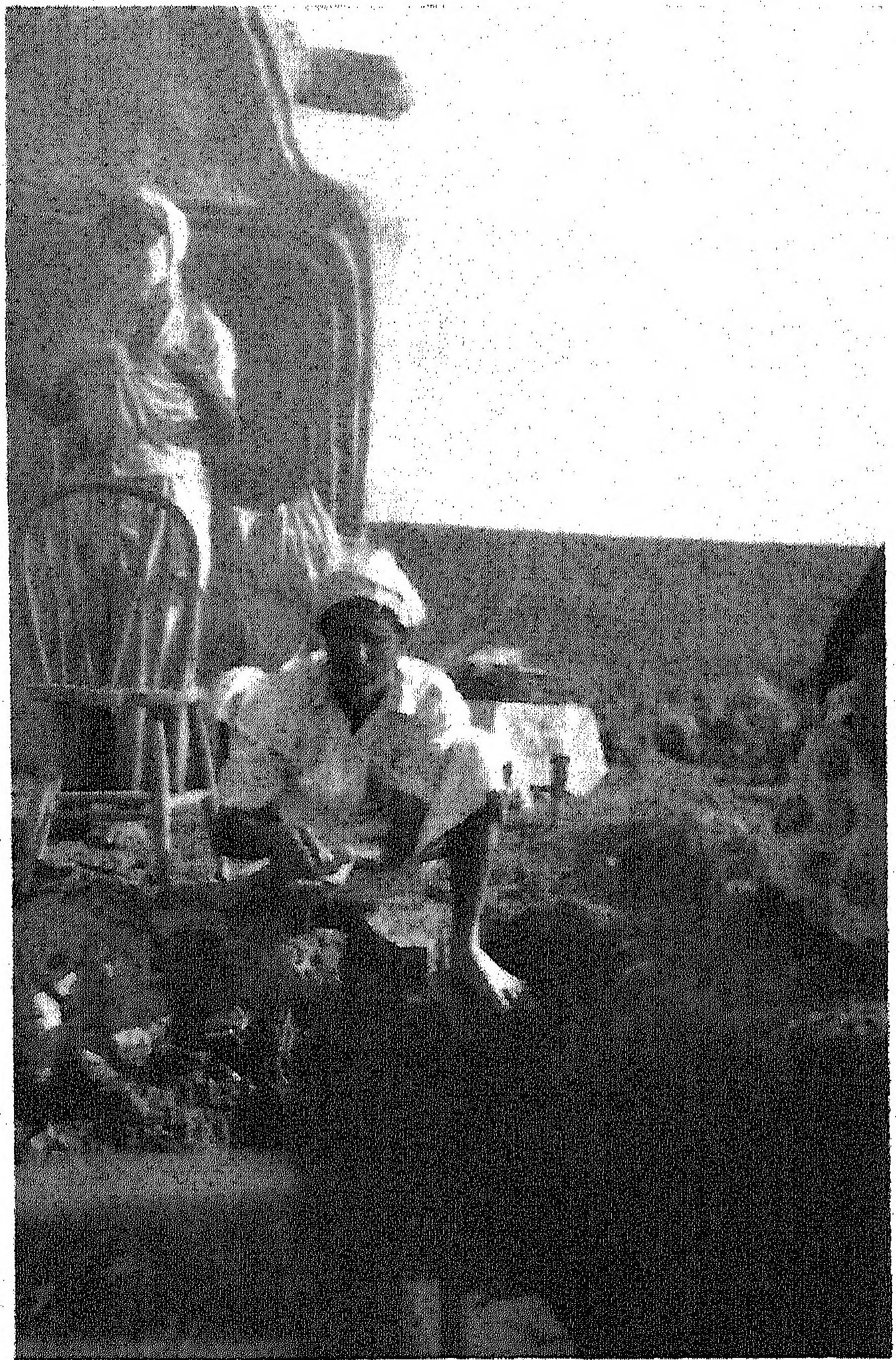
Kneading dough for pihta during the 1930s in southern Iraq

In Mandaeism, the pihta (Classical Mandaic: ࡐࡉࡄࡕࡀ, lit. 'opened; something broken apart or into pieces') is a type of sacramental bread used with rituals performed by Mandaean priests. It is a small, round, biscuit-sized flatbread that can either be salted or saltless, depending on whether the ritual use of the pihta is for living or dead people.

The pihta is not to be confused with the faṭira, a small, round, saltless, half-baked biscuit also used in Mandaean rituals.

== Description ==
The pihta, as used in rituals for living people such as the masbuta, is a small, round, salted, biscuit-sized flatbread made by mixing flour and salt with water, followed by baking. It can only be made by Mandaean priests, and the flour is also ground by priests. Unlike the faṭira, which is saltless sacramental bread used for the masiqta, the pihta (as used in masbuta rituals) is salted (with salt mixed into the dough before baking), since salt (mihla) represents symbolizes the soul according to the Alma Rišaia Rba. However, pihta is also used during masiqta rituals. In this case, the pihta is not salted, since the lack of salt symbolizes the departure of the soul from the body. (See also: blessed salt)

== Ritual usage ==
Every Sunday, Mandaeans participate in a baptismal mass (maṣbuta) involving immersion in flowing water (yardna) by ordained priests. The baptized then consume pieces of salted pihta blessed by a priest in order to restore their connections (laufa) with the World of Light (see Mandaean cosmology).

Saltless pihta is also used in masiqta rituals.

== Associated ritual objects ==
The brihi is a ritual clay fire saucer. Its narrow end faces north. The brihi is used for the pihta and riha.

The gišar is a stone flour mill that can only be used by priests for grinding sacramental flour.

== Prayers ==
Various prayers in the Qulasta, including prayers 36–45 and 59, are recited during the sacrament of the pihta.

== See also ==
- Sacramental bread
- Fatira
- Sa (Mandaeism)
