= Ṣa (Mandaeism) =

Sacramental flatbread in Mandaeism

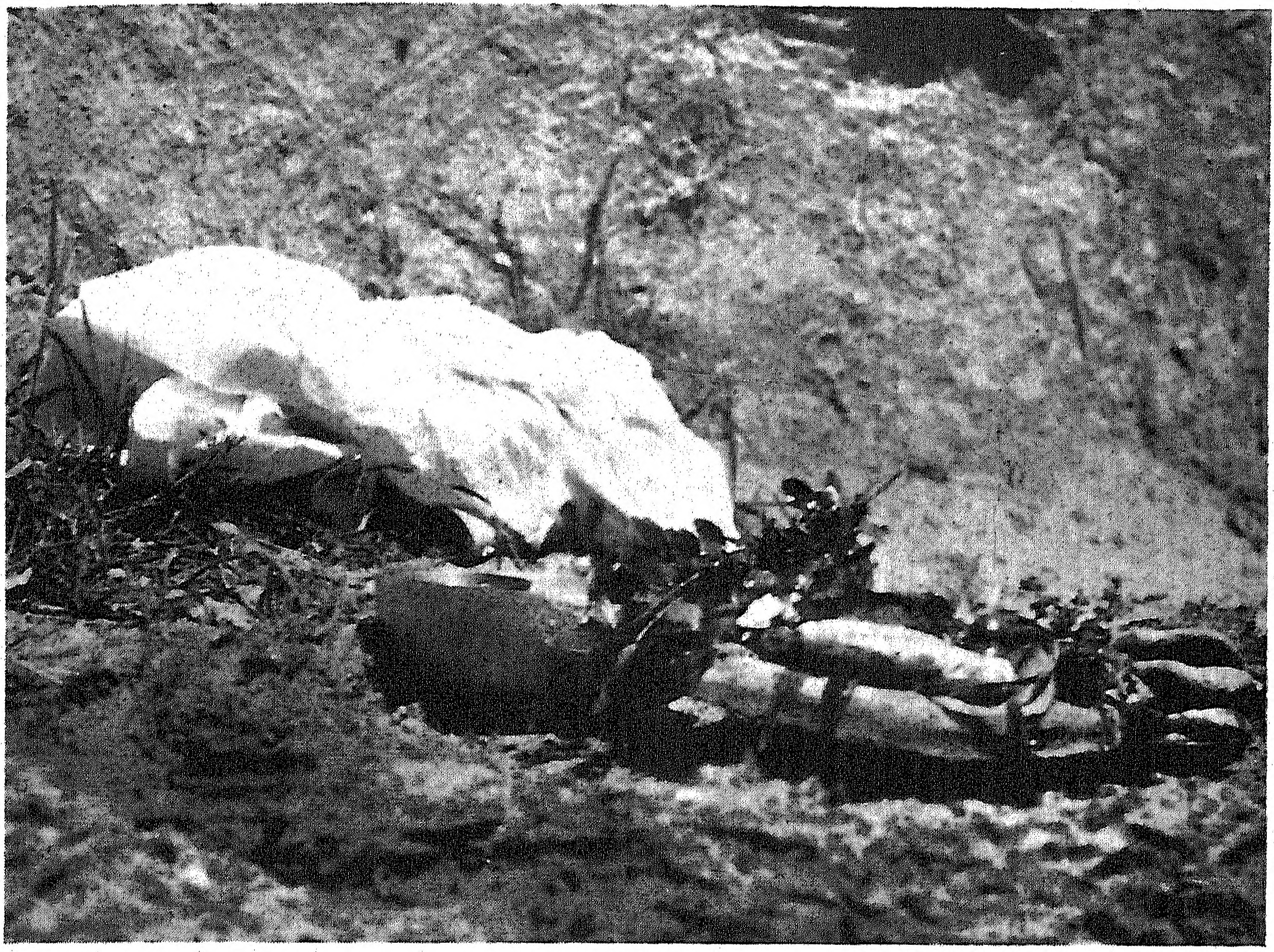
Ṣa placed on a ṭariana (clay tray) during the 1930s in southern Iraq

In Mandaeism, the ṣa (Classical Mandaic: ࡑࡀ) is a rolled-up piece of sacramental flatbread that contains nuts and raisins, is also used in ritual meals for the dead and has a phallic symbolism. It is a small round flap of unleavened bread that is rolled up like a scroll.

It is distinct from the pihta and faṭira, which are flatbreads that are not rolled up.

The ṣa is also mentioned as the 'great first sindirka (male date-palm)' in the Scroll of the Great Baptism (line 139 f.).

== See also ==
- Sacramental bread
- Pihta
- Fatira
