= Nidbai =

Uthra in Mandaeism

- Guardian of Piriawis
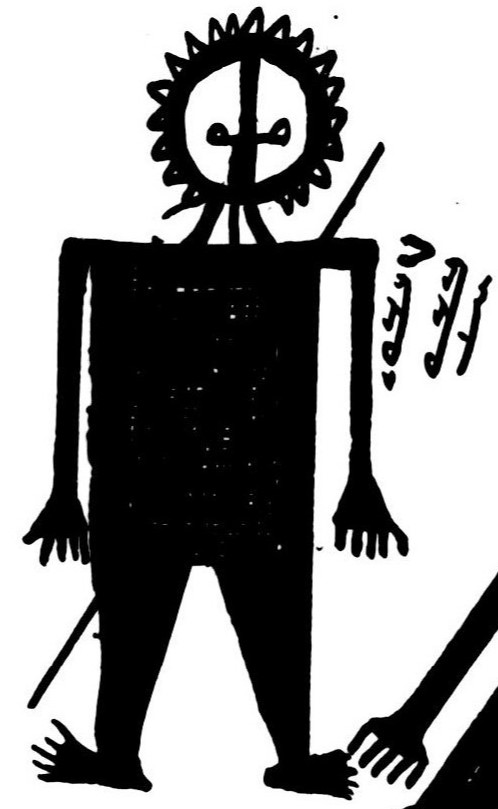
- Nidbai in Zihrun Raza Kasia (DC 27)
- Abode: World of Light

In Mandaeism, Nidbai (Classical Mandaic: ࡍࡉࡃࡁࡀࡉ, Modern Mandaic pronunciation: [ˈnɪdβej], sometimes also [ˈnudβej]) is an uthra (angel or guardian) who serves as one of the two guardian spirits (ʿutria naṭria) of Piriawis, the heavenly yardna (river) in the World of Light. In the Ginza Rabba and Qulasta, he is usually mentioned together with Shilmai.

== See also ==
- List of angels in theology
- Adathan and Yadathan
- Xroshtag and Padvaxtag in Manichaeism
