= Semi-automatic =

Semi-automatic - Noun: "Partially automatic and partially manual in operation (i.e., operated both automatically and manually, by hand); not fully-automatic." This may refer to:

- A semi-automatic firearm, a firearm which automatically loads the next round, but will only fire one round per trigger pull
  - Semi-automatic rifle
  - Semi-automatic pistol
  - Semi-automatic shotgun
- Semiautomatic switching system, a term used in telecommunication
- Semi-automatic transmission: a manual transmission with an automated clutch (i.e., no physical clutch pedal), but the driver is still required to shift gears manually. Also called: clutchless manual transmission or automated manual transmission.
- "Semi-Automatic", a song from Twenty One Pilots' 2013 album Vessel
