= Shilmai =

Uthra in Mandaeism

- Guardian of Piriawis
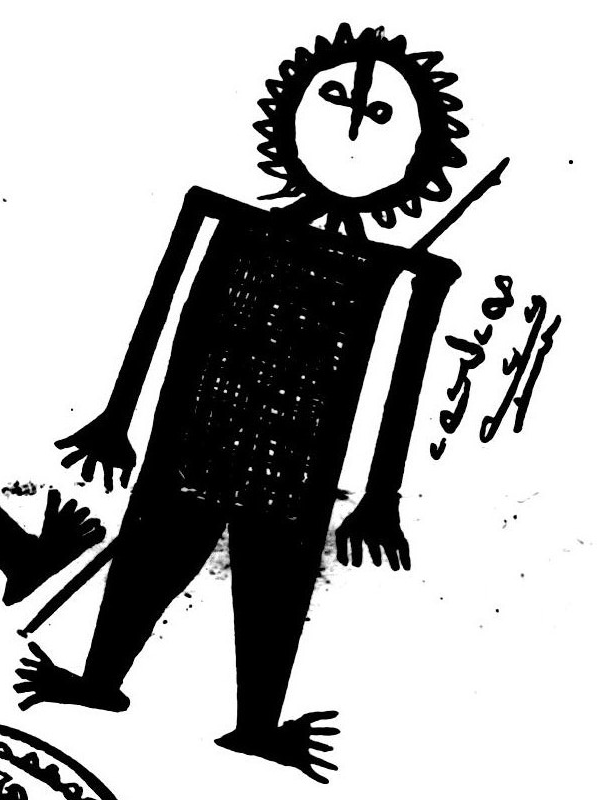
- Shilmai in Zihrun Raza Kasia (DC 27)
- Other names: Shalmai
- Abode: World of Light
- Texts: The Book of Šilmai, Lord of the House (Right Ginza 5.5)
- Parents: Yathrun

In Mandaeism, Shilmai (Šilmai; Classical Mandaic: ࡔࡉࡋࡌࡀࡉ, Modern Mandaic pronunciation: [ˈʃɪlmej], sometimes also [ˈʃulmej]) or Shalmai (Šalmai) is an uthra (angel or guardian) who serves as one of the two guardian spirits of Piriawis, the heavenly yardna (river) in the World of Light. In the Ginza Rabba and Qulasta, he is usually mentioned together with Nidbai.

Nhar and Kbar and mentioned as the "clouds" (Mandaic: anana) of Shilmai and Nidbai in Chapter 17.1 of the Right Ginza.

== In the Ginza Rabba ==
In Chapter 1.1 of the Left Ginza, Shilmai plays the role of Abatur as a matarta guardian during Shitil's ascent to the World of Light. Left Ginza 1.1 describes Shilmai as such:

... the purgatory of Šilmai, the man, a ganzibra, who holds the poles of radiance (ḏ-sikia ḏ-ziua) in his hand, and the keys of kušṭa (u-qlidia ḏ-kušṭa) upon his arms (ʿl trin draiia). And they opened the gate of the treasure-house for him [Shitil].

In Chapter 5.5 (Book 7 in the Drabsha edition) of the Right Ginza, The Book of Šilmai, Lord of the House, is named after Šilmai. In the same chapter and also in Book 6 of the Right Ginza, the uthra Yathrun is mentioned as the father of Shilmai.

In this part of the Ginza Rabba, Shilmai is portrayed very differently from all other Mandaean texts. While most Mandaean texts portray Shilmai as a guardian uthra of the heavenly Jordan who is always paired with Nidbai, the Book of Šilmai portrays him as the "Master/Lord of the House" (i.e., Tibil) who is part of the entourage of Ruha. Meanwhile, Yathrun is an uthra at the gate of the house of the Life (i.e., the World of Light) and is referred to as "the Good."

In the text, Ruha urges Shilmai to ascend to the World of Light to visit his father Yathrun. Shilmai then goes to visit Yathrun after washing his hands in kushta and purifying his fingers in light. Upon reaching his father, Yathrun, who had never been angry before, is initially enraged at the sight of Shilmai but is calmed down by his 362 uthra disciples. Yathrun then proceeds to asks a series of questions to Shilmai, including questions on the creation and nature of the material universe and the human life cycle. Shilmai is able to answer all of them, except for the final question about the end of the universe. Unable to answer this question at first, Hibil Ziwa then provides the answer to Shilmai. Shilmai provides the answer about the impermanence of the material universe, that the earth, sky, sun, moon, stars, elements, Ruha and her entourage will all cease to exist at the end of times. Yathrun then asks Shilmai where he had obtained this information. When he admits that he had obtained the answer from the uthra Hibil Ziwa, Shilmai is rejected by his father and is unable to enter the World of Light.

== See also ==
- List of angels in theology
- List of minor biblical tribes § Shalmai, descendants of
- Adathan and Yadathan
- Xroshtag and Padvaxtag in Manichaeism
