= Sa (Javanese) =

sa
- ꦱ
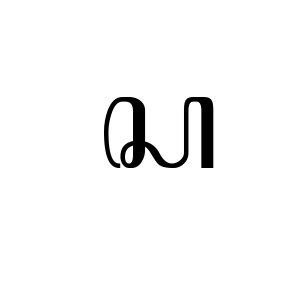
- Aksara nglegena

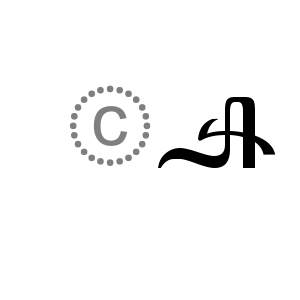
- Aksara pasangan

Usage
- Writing system: Javanese script
- Latin orthography: sa
- Sound values: [s]
- In Unicode: A9B1

ꦱ is a syllabogram in the Javanese script that represents the sounds /sɔ/ and /sa/. It is transliterated to Latin as "sa", and sometimes in Indonesian orthography as "so". It has another form (pasangan), which is ꧀ꦱ, but represented by a single Unicode code point, U+A9B1.

== Pasangan ==
Its pasangan form ꧀ꦱ, is one of six pasangan that are placed on the right-hand side of the previous syllable. Therefore, it is permissible to write two pasangan at the same time without having to resort to pangkon (꧀).

The location of the sandhangan ꦶ, ꦼ, or ꦁ is on top the pasangan, not on the previous syllable. (See glyph table below)

== Extended form ==
The letter ꦱ has a murda form, which is ꦯ.

Using cecak telu (ꦱ꦳), the syllable represents /ʃa/.

== Mahaprana ==
Mahaprana letters were originally aspirated consonants used in Sanskrit and Kawi transliterations. However, there are no aspirated consonants in modern Javanese. The mahaprana form of ꦱ is ꦰ.

== Glyphs ==
Nglegena forms				Pasangan forms			
ꦱ sa	ꦱꦃ sah	ꦱꦁ sang	ꦱꦂ sar	◌꧀ꦱ -sa	◌꧀ꦱꦃ -sah	◌꧀ꦱꦁ -sang	◌꧀ꦱꦂ -sar
ꦱꦺ se	ꦱꦺꦃ seh	ꦱꦺꦁ seng	ꦱꦺꦂ ser	◌꧀ꦱꦺ -se	◌꧀ꦱꦺꦃ -seh	◌꧀ꦱꦺꦁ -seng	◌꧀ꦱꦺꦂ -ser
ꦱꦼ sê	ꦱꦼꦃ sêh	ꦱꦼꦁ sêng	ꦱꦼꦂ sêr	◌꧀ꦱꦼ -sê	◌꧀ꦱꦼꦃ -sêh	◌꧀ꦱꦼꦁ -sêng	◌꧀ꦱꦼꦂ -sêr
ꦱꦶ si	ꦱꦶꦃ sih	ꦱꦶꦁ sing	ꦱꦶꦂ sir	◌꧀ꦱꦶ -si	◌꧀ꦱꦶꦃ -sih	◌꧀ꦱꦶꦁ -sing	◌꧀ꦱꦶꦂ -sir
ꦱꦺꦴ so	ꦱꦺꦴꦃ soh	ꦱꦺꦴꦁ song	ꦱꦺꦴꦂ sor	◌꧀ꦱꦺꦴ -so	◌꧀ꦱꦺꦴꦃ -soh	◌꧀ꦱꦺꦴꦁ -song	◌꧀ꦱꦺꦴꦂ -sor
ꦱꦸ su	ꦱꦸꦃ suh	ꦱꦸꦁ sung	ꦱꦸꦂ sur	◌꧀ꦱꦸ -su	◌꧀ꦱꦸꦃ -suh	◌꧀ꦱꦸꦁ -sung	◌꧀ꦱꦸꦂ -sur
ꦱꦿ sra	ꦱꦿꦃ srah	ꦱꦿꦁ srang	ꦱꦿꦂ srar	◌꧀ꦱꦿ -sra	◌꧀ꦱꦿꦃ -srah	◌꧀ꦱꦿꦁ -srang	◌꧀ꦱꦿꦂ -srar
ꦱꦿꦺ sre	ꦱꦿꦺꦃ sreh	ꦱꦿꦺꦁ sreng	ꦱꦿꦺꦂ srer	◌꧀ꦱꦿꦺ -sre	◌꧀ꦱꦿꦺꦃ -sreh	◌꧀ꦱꦿꦺꦁ -sreng	◌꧀ꦱꦿꦺꦂ -srer
ꦱꦽ srê	ꦱꦽꦃ srêh	ꦱꦽꦁ srêng	ꦱꦽꦂ srêr	◌꧀ꦱꦽ -srê	◌꧀ꦱꦽꦃ -srêh	◌꧀ꦱꦽꦁ -srêng	◌꧀ꦱꦽꦂ -srêr
ꦱꦿꦶ sri	ꦱꦿꦶꦃ srih	ꦱꦿꦶꦁ sring	ꦱꦿꦶꦂ srir	◌꧀ꦱꦿꦶ -sri	◌꧀ꦱꦿꦶꦃ -srih	◌꧀ꦱꦿꦶꦁ -sring	◌꧀ꦱꦿꦶꦂ -srir
ꦱꦿꦺꦴ sro	ꦱꦿꦺꦴꦃ sroh	ꦱꦿꦺꦴꦁ srong	ꦱꦿꦺꦴꦂ sror	◌꧀ꦱꦿꦺꦴ -sro	◌꧀ꦱꦿꦺꦴꦃ -sroh	◌꧀ꦱꦿꦺꦴꦁ -srong	◌꧀ꦱꦿꦺꦴꦂ -sror
ꦱꦿꦸ sru	ꦱꦿꦸꦃ sruh	ꦱꦿꦸꦁ srung	ꦱꦿꦸꦂ srur	◌꧀ꦱꦿꦸ -sru	◌꧀ꦱꦿꦸꦃ -sruh	◌꧀ꦱꦿꦸꦁ -srung	◌꧀ꦱꦿꦸꦂ -srur
ꦱꦾ sya	ꦱꦾꦃ syah	ꦱꦾꦁ syang	ꦱꦾꦂ syar	◌꧀ꦱꦾ -sya	◌꧀ꦱꦾꦃ -syah	◌꧀ꦱꦾꦁ -syang	◌꧀ꦱꦾꦂ -syar
ꦱꦾꦺ sye	ꦱꦾꦺꦃ syeh	ꦱꦾꦺꦁ syeng	ꦱꦾꦺꦂ syer	◌꧀ꦱꦾꦺ -sye	◌꧀ꦱꦾꦺꦃ -syeh	◌꧀ꦱꦾꦺꦁ -syeng	◌꧀ꦱꦾꦺꦂ -syer
ꦱꦾꦼ syê	ꦱꦾꦼꦃ syêh	ꦱꦾꦼꦁ syêng	ꦱꦾꦼꦂ syêr	◌꧀ꦱꦾꦼ -syê	◌꧀ꦱꦾꦼꦃ -syêh	◌꧀ꦱꦾꦼꦁ -syêng	◌꧀ꦱꦾꦼꦂ -syêr
ꦱꦾꦶ syi	ꦱꦾꦶꦃ syih	ꦱꦾꦶꦁ sying	ꦱꦾꦶꦂ syir	◌꧀ꦱꦾꦶ -syi	◌꧀ꦱꦾꦶꦃ -syih	◌꧀ꦱꦾꦶꦁ -sying	◌꧀ꦱꦾꦶꦂ -syir
ꦱꦾꦺꦴ syo	ꦱꦾꦺꦴꦃ syoh	ꦱꦾꦺꦴꦁ syong	ꦱꦾꦺꦴꦂ syor	◌꧀ꦱꦾꦺꦴ -syo	◌꧀ꦱꦾꦺꦴꦃ -syoh	◌꧀ꦱꦾꦺꦴꦁ -syong	◌꧀ꦱꦾꦺꦴꦂ -syor
ꦱꦾꦸ syu	ꦱꦾꦸꦃ syuh	ꦱꦾꦸꦁ syung	ꦱꦾꦸꦂ syur	◌꧀ꦱꦾꦸ -syu	◌꧀ꦱꦾꦸꦃ -syuh	◌꧀ꦱꦾꦸꦁ -syung	◌꧀ꦱꦾꦸꦂ -syur

Other forms
Nglegena forms				Pasangan forms			
ꦱ꦳ sya	ꦱ꦳ꦃ syah	ꦱ꦳ꦁ syang	ꦱ꦳ꦂ syar	◌꧀ꦱ꦳ -sya	◌꧀ꦱ꦳ꦃ -syah	◌꧀ꦱ꦳ꦁ -syang	◌꧀ꦱ꦳ꦂ -syar
ꦱ꦳ꦺ sye	ꦱ꦳ꦺꦃ syeh	ꦱ꦳ꦺꦁ syeng	ꦱ꦳ꦺꦂ syer	◌꧀ꦱ꦳ꦺ -sye	◌꧀ꦱ꦳ꦺꦃ -syeh	◌꧀ꦱ꦳ꦺꦁ -syeng	◌꧀ꦱ꦳ꦺꦂ -syer
ꦱ꦳ꦼ syê	ꦱ꦳ꦼꦃ syêh	ꦱ꦳ꦼꦁ syêng	ꦱ꦳ꦼꦂ syêr	◌꧀ꦱ꦳ꦼ -syê	◌꧀ꦱ꦳ꦼꦃ -syêh	◌꧀ꦱ꦳ꦼꦁ -syêng	◌꧀ꦱ꦳ꦼꦂ -syêr
ꦱ꦳ꦶ syi	ꦱ꦳ꦶꦃ syih	ꦱ꦳ꦶꦁ sying	ꦱ꦳ꦶꦂ syir	◌꧀ꦱ꦳ꦶ -syi	◌꧀ꦱ꦳ꦶꦃ -syih	◌꧀ꦱ꦳ꦶꦁ -sying	◌꧀ꦱ꦳ꦶꦂ -syir
ꦱ꦳ꦺꦴ syo	ꦱ꦳ꦺꦴꦃ syoh	ꦱ꦳ꦺꦴꦁ syong	ꦱ꦳ꦺꦴꦂ syor	◌꧀ꦱ꦳ꦺꦴ -syo	◌꧀ꦱ꦳ꦺꦴꦃ -syoh	◌꧀ꦱ꦳ꦺꦴꦁ -syong	◌꧀ꦱ꦳ꦺꦴꦂ -syor
ꦱ꦳ꦸ syu	ꦱ꦳ꦸꦃ syuh	ꦱ꦳ꦸꦁ syung	ꦱ꦳ꦸꦂ syur	◌꧀ꦱ꦳ꦸ -syu	◌꧀ꦱ꦳ꦸꦃ -syuh	◌꧀ꦱ꦳ꦸꦁ -syung	◌꧀ꦱ꦳ꦸꦂ -syur
ꦱ꦳ꦿ syra	ꦱ꦳ꦿꦃ syrah	ꦱ꦳ꦿꦁ syrang	ꦱ꦳ꦿꦂ syrar	◌꧀ꦱ꦳ꦿ -syra	◌꧀ꦱ꦳ꦿꦃ -syrah	◌꧀ꦱ꦳ꦿꦁ -syrang	◌꧀ꦱ꦳ꦿꦂ -syrar
ꦱ꦳ꦿꦺ syre	ꦱ꦳ꦿꦺꦃ syreh	ꦱ꦳ꦿꦺꦁ syreng	ꦱ꦳ꦿꦺꦂ syrer	◌꧀ꦱ꦳ꦿꦺ -syre	◌꧀ꦱ꦳ꦿꦺꦃ -syreh	◌꧀ꦱ꦳ꦿꦺꦁ -syreng	◌꧀ꦱ꦳ꦿꦺꦂ -syrer
ꦱ꦳ꦽ syrê	ꦱ꦳ꦽꦃ syrêh	ꦱ꦳ꦽꦁ syrêng	ꦱ꦳ꦽꦂ syrêr	◌꧀ꦱ꦳ꦽ -syrê	◌꧀ꦱ꦳ꦽꦃ -syrêh	◌꧀ꦱ꦳ꦽꦁ -syrêng	◌꧀ꦱ꦳ꦽꦂ -syrêr
ꦱ꦳ꦿꦶ syri	ꦱ꦳ꦿꦶꦃ syrih	ꦱ꦳ꦿꦶꦁ syring	ꦱ꦳ꦿꦶꦂ syrir	◌꧀ꦱ꦳ꦿꦶ -syri	◌꧀ꦱ꦳ꦿꦶꦃ -syrih	◌꧀ꦱ꦳ꦿꦶꦁ -syring	◌꧀ꦱ꦳ꦿꦶꦂ -syrir
ꦱ꦳ꦿꦺꦴ syro	ꦱ꦳ꦿꦺꦴꦃ syroh	ꦱ꦳ꦿꦺꦴꦁ syrong	ꦱ꦳ꦿꦺꦴꦂ syror	◌꧀ꦱ꦳ꦿꦺꦴ -syro	◌꧀ꦱ꦳ꦿꦺꦴꦃ -syroh	◌꧀ꦱ꦳ꦿꦺꦴꦁ -syrong	◌꧀ꦱ꦳ꦿꦺꦴꦂ -syror
ꦱ꦳ꦿꦸ syru	ꦱ꦳ꦿꦸꦃ syruh	ꦱ꦳ꦿꦸꦁ syrung	ꦱ꦳ꦿꦸꦂ syrur	◌꧀ꦱ꦳ꦿꦸ -syru	◌꧀ꦱ꦳ꦿꦸꦃ -syruh	◌꧀ꦱ꦳ꦿꦸꦁ -syrung	◌꧀ꦱ꦳ꦿꦸꦂ -syrur
ꦱ꦳ꦾ syya	ꦱ꦳ꦾꦃ syyah	ꦱ꦳ꦾꦁ syyang	ꦱ꦳ꦾꦂ syyar	◌꧀ꦱ꦳ꦾ -syya	◌꧀ꦱ꦳ꦾꦃ -syyah	◌꧀ꦱ꦳ꦾꦁ -syyang	◌꧀ꦱ꦳ꦾꦂ -syyar
ꦱ꦳ꦾꦺ syye	ꦱ꦳ꦾꦺꦃ syyeh	ꦱ꦳ꦾꦺꦁ syyeng	ꦱ꦳ꦾꦺꦂ syyer	◌꧀ꦱ꦳ꦾꦺ -syye	◌꧀ꦱ꦳ꦾꦺꦃ -syyeh	◌꧀ꦱ꦳ꦾꦺꦁ -syyeng	◌꧀ꦱ꦳ꦾꦺꦂ -syyer
ꦱ꦳ꦾꦼ syyê	ꦱ꦳ꦾꦼꦃ syyêh	ꦱ꦳ꦾꦼꦁ syyêng	ꦱ꦳ꦾꦼꦂ syyêr	◌꧀ꦱ꦳ꦾꦼ -syyê	◌꧀ꦱ꦳ꦾꦼꦃ -syyêh	◌꧀ꦱ꦳ꦾꦼꦁ -syyêng	◌꧀ꦱ꦳ꦾꦼꦂ -syyêr
ꦱ꦳ꦾꦶ syyi	ꦱ꦳ꦾꦶꦃ syyih	ꦱ꦳ꦾꦶꦁ syying	ꦱ꦳ꦾꦶꦂ syyir	◌꧀ꦱ꦳ꦾꦶ -syyi	◌꧀ꦱ꦳ꦾꦶꦃ -syyih	◌꧀ꦱ꦳ꦾꦶꦁ -syying	◌꧀ꦱ꦳ꦾꦶꦂ -syyir
ꦱ꦳ꦾꦺꦴ syyo	ꦱ꦳ꦾꦺꦴꦃ syyoh	ꦱ꦳ꦾꦺꦴꦁ syyong	ꦱ꦳ꦾꦺꦴꦂ syyor	◌꧀ꦱ꦳ꦾꦺꦴ -syyo	◌꧀ꦱ꦳ꦾꦺꦴꦃ -syyoh	◌꧀ꦱ꦳ꦾꦺꦴꦁ -syyong	◌꧀ꦱ꦳ꦾꦺꦴꦂ -syyor
ꦱ꦳ꦾꦸ syyu	ꦱ꦳ꦾꦸꦃ syyuh	ꦱ꦳ꦾꦸꦁ syyung	ꦱ꦳ꦾꦸꦂ syyur	◌꧀ꦱ꦳ꦾꦸ -syyu	◌꧀ꦱ꦳ꦾꦸꦃ -syyuh	◌꧀ꦱ꦳ꦾꦸꦁ -syyung	◌꧀ꦱ꦳ꦾꦸꦂ -syyur

== Unicode block ==
Javanese script was added to the Unicode Standard in October, 2009 with the release of version 5.2.

Javanese^{[1]}^{[2]} Official Unicode Consortium code chart (PDF)
	0	1	2	3	4	5	6	7	8	9	A	B	C	D	E	F
U+A98x	ꦀ	ꦁ	ꦂ	ꦃ	ꦄ	ꦅ	ꦆ	ꦇ	ꦈ	ꦉ	ꦊ	ꦋ	ꦌ	ꦍ	ꦎ	ꦏ
U+A99x	ꦐ	ꦑ	ꦒ	ꦓ	ꦔ	ꦕ	ꦖ	ꦗ	ꦘ	ꦙ	ꦚ	ꦛ	ꦜ	ꦝ	ꦞ	ꦟ
U+A9Ax	ꦠ	ꦡ	ꦢ	ꦣ	ꦤ	ꦥ	ꦦ	ꦧ	ꦨ	ꦩ	ꦪ	ꦫ	ꦬ	ꦭ	ꦮ	ꦯ
U+A9Bx	ꦰ	ꦱ	ꦲ	꦳	ꦴ	ꦵ	ꦶ	ꦷ	ꦸ	ꦹ	ꦺ	ꦻ	ꦼ	ꦽ	ꦾ	ꦿ
U+A9Cx	꧀	꧁	꧂	꧃	꧄	꧅	꧆	꧇	꧈	꧉	꧊	꧋	꧌	꧍		ꧏ
U+A9Dx	꧐	꧑	꧒	꧓	꧔	꧕	꧖	꧗	꧘	꧙					꧞	꧟
Notes 1.As of Unicode version 17.0 2.Grey areas indicate non-assigned code points
