= Yardna =

Rivers in Mandaeism

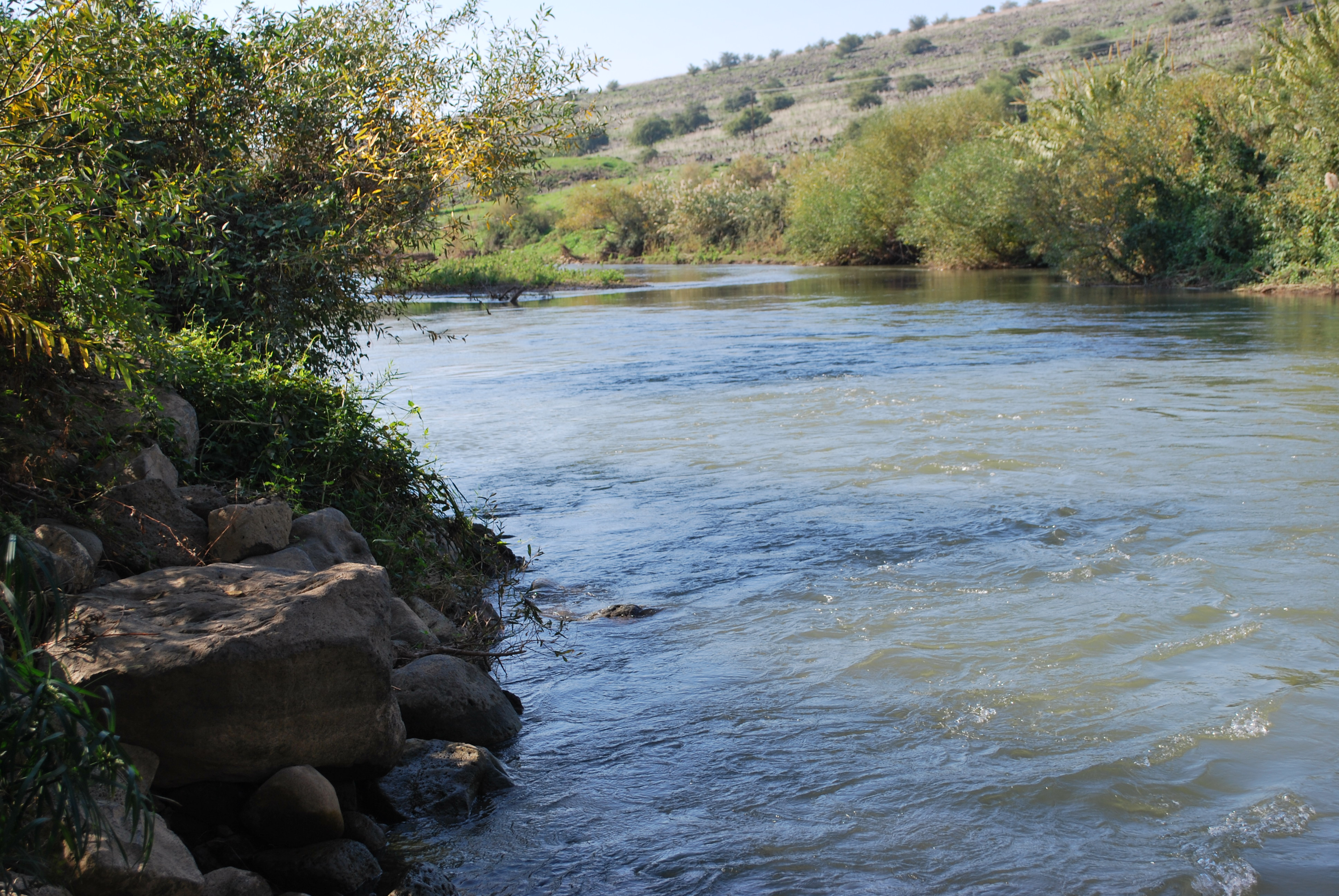
The Jordan River

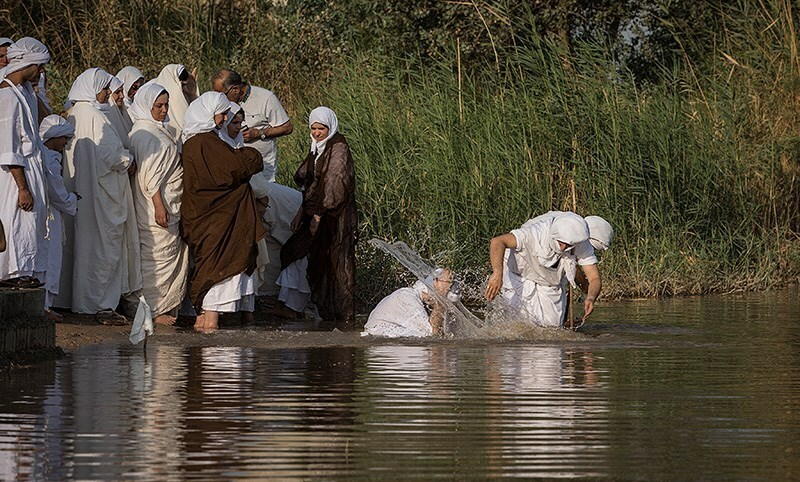
Mandaean masbuta in the Karun River, Ahvaz, Iran

In Mandaeism, a yardna (Classical Mandaic: ࡉࡀࡓࡃࡍࡀ, romanized: iardna, lit. 'Jordan') or yardena ([jardəna]; Arabic: یردنا) is a body of flowing fresh water (or in Classical Mandaic: ࡌࡉࡀ ࡄࡉࡉࡀ, romanized: mia hiia, lit. 'living water'; pronounced meyya heyyi) that is suitable for ritual use as baptismal water. The masbuta and other Mandaean rituals such as the tamasha can only be performed in a yardna. Stagnant fresh water, brackish water, and seawater are not considered to be yardnas.

Unlike in Islam, Christianity, or Yazidism, no earthly geographic location is exclusively considered to be sacrosanct in Mandaeism. This is because Mandaeism does not have shrines, holy sites, or pilgrimage sites tied to specific geographical locations, since any river with flowing water can be used for religious rituals.

== Examples of yardnas ==
Although etymologically related to the Canaanite word yarden (Hebrew: ירדן), or the Jordan River, a yardna in Mandaeism can refer to any flowing river. Traditionally, these were typically the Euphrates (Mandaic: Praš), Tigris (Mandaic: Diglat), and Karun (Mandaic: ʿUlat) rivers. The Euphrates is called Praš Ziwa (ࡐࡓࡀࡔ ࡆࡉࡅࡀ; pronounced Fraš Ziwa) in the Ginza Rabba. In Mandaean scriptures, the Euphrates is considered to be the earthly manifestation of the heavenly yardna or flowing river (similar to the Yazidi concept of Lalish being the earthly manifestation of its heavenly counterpart).

In Worcester, Massachusetts, United States, Lake Quinsigamond (the source of the Quinsigamond River) is used as a yardna for baptism. In San Antonio and Austin, Texas, the Guadalupe River is the main yardna used.

In Australia, the Nepean River (utilized by Wallacia Mandi) and the Georges River are the yardnas that are most commonly used by Mandaeans. In Sweden, particularly during the winter, indoor pools with flowing water are used as ritual yardnas in mandis.

== Heavenly counterpart ==
Piriawis, a river in the World of Light, is the heavenly counterpart of all yardnas on earth, which are considered by Mandaeans to be manifestations of Piriawis.

== Sacramental water ==
There are two types of sacramental water used for Mandaean rituals, namely mambuha ("drinking water") and halalta ("rinsing water"). Both are drawn directly from a yardna.

== Uthras ==
Mandaean texts mention various uthras watching over yardnas.

Book 14 of the Right Ginza mentions Adathan and Yadathan as the guardians of the "first yardna" (yardna qadmayya).

Shilmai and Nidbai are the two guardian uthras (celestial beings) watching over Piriawis, the heavenly yardna in the World of Light.

== See also ==
- Qasr al-Yahud
- Al-Maghtas
- Holy water
- Living Water
- Sacred waters
- Water of Life (Christianity)
