= Pandama =

Mandaean mouth-veil

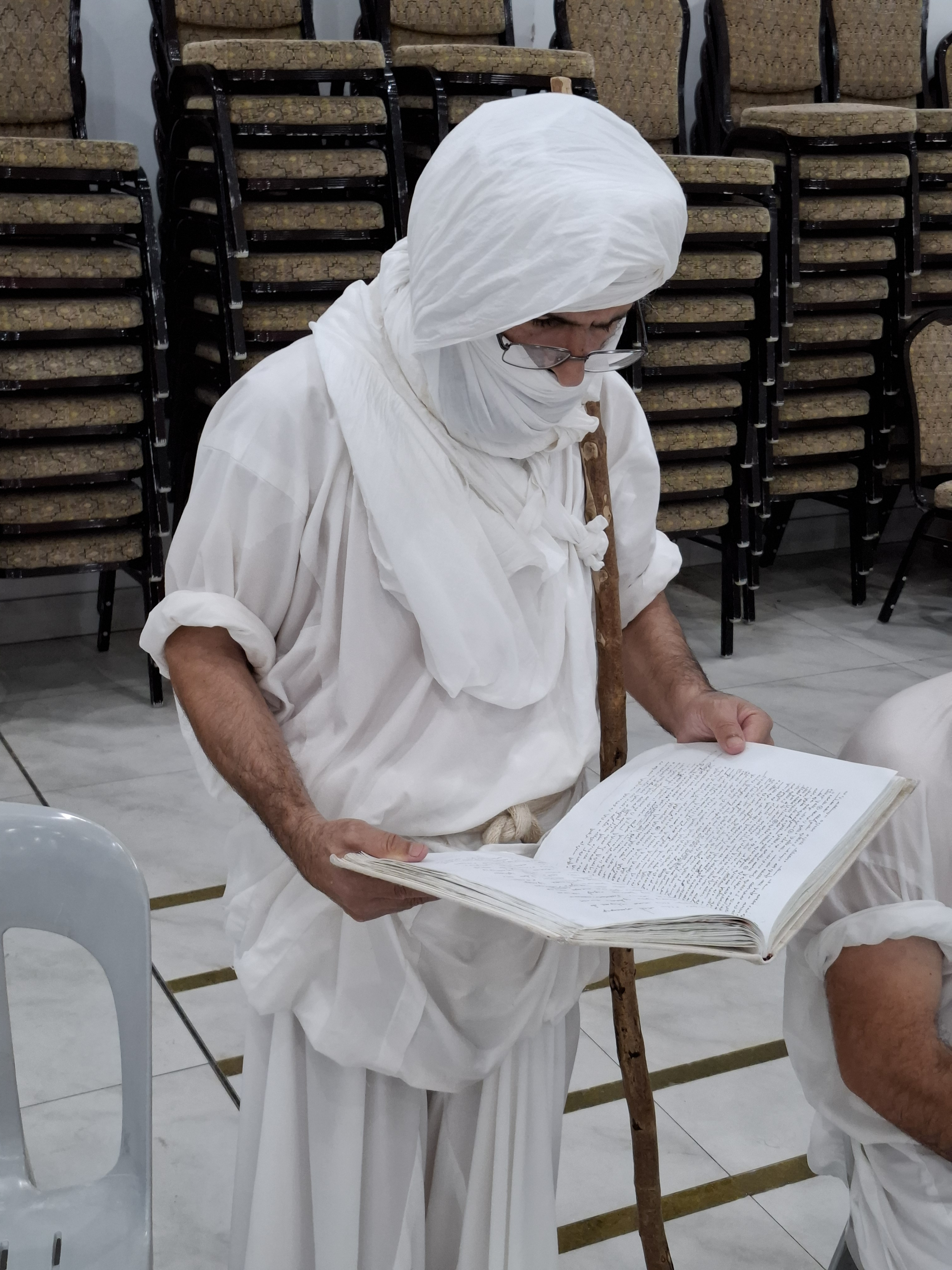
- Tarmida Sahi Bashikh wearing a pandama (mouth veil) as he reads Mandaean prayers at Yahya Yuhana Mandi during Parwanaya 2025
- Type: mouth-veil
- Material: cotton cloth
- Place of origin: southern Iraq and southwestern Iran

The pandama (Classical Mandaic: ࡐࡀࡍࡃࡀࡌࡀ) is a mouth-veil worn by Mandaean priests while performing baptismal ceremonial rituals. It is the loose end of the burzinqa (turban) and is wrapped around the mouth and lower face. The pandama also protects the face from water during masbuta rituals. The pandama is worn only by officiating priests, not by Mandaean laymen.

== Etymology ==
The word pandama is of Iranian origin. Macuch (1965) gives the etymology pandama < *paddan < padān.

== In the Qulasta ==
Several prayers in the Qulasta are recited when putting on and loosening the pandama, including prayers 7 and 55.

== Symbolism ==
According to Shahram Ebadfardzadeh, an Iranian-American yalufa (learned Mandaean layperson) in San Antonio, Texas, United States, "when the priest officiates, he is an angel, and his lower face must not be seen, but covered up."

== See also ==
- Mandaean priest § Clothing
- Litham, a similar veil covering the lower face worn by Tuareg men
- Alasho, a similar turban veil worn by Hausa men
