= Water of Life (Christianity) =

Term in Christianity often referring to the Holy Spirit

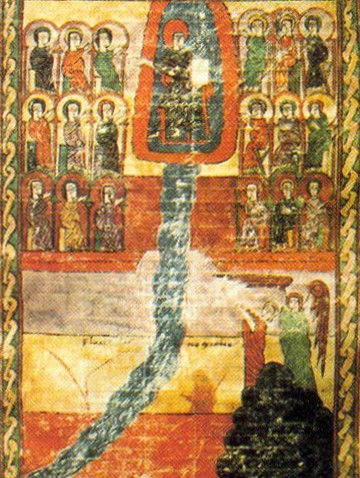
Depiction of Fleuve de Vie, the "River of Life", from the Book of Revelation, Urgell Beatus, (f°198v-199), c. 10th century

In Christianity the term "water of Life" (Greek: ὕδωρ ζωῆς hydōr zōēs) (Latin: Aqua Vitae /ˌækwə ˈviːteɪ/) is used in the context of living water, specific references appearing in the Book of Revelation (21:6 and 22:1), as well as the Gospel of John. In these references, the term Water of Life refers to the Holy Spirit.

The passages that comprise John 4:10–26 are sometimes referred to as the Water of Life Discourse. These references in the Gospel of John are also interpreted as the Water of Life.

The term is also used when water is poured during Baptismal prayers, praying for the Holy Spirit, e.g., "Give it the power to become water of life".

== The Book of Revelation ==
The reference to Water of Life in Revelation 21:6 appears in the context of New Jerusalem and states:

"I will give unto him that is athirst of the fountain of the water of life freely". Revelation 22:1 then states: "And he showed me a river of water of life, bright as crystal, proceeding out of the throne of God and of the Lamb".

The Revelation reference is interpreted as the Holy Spirit. The Catechism of the Catholic Church, item 1137, considers it "one of most beautiful symbols of the Holy Spirit".

The common theme of thirst for the Water of Life in the Book of Revelation and the Gospel of John may be summarized as follows:

Revelation 21:6	John 7:37	John 4:14
... to the thirsty I will freely give from the fountain of the water of life.	... if any man thirsts, let him come unto me and drink.	... the water that I shall give him shall become in him a well of water springing up unto eternal life.

The use of the term Water of Life in Revelation 20 is part of the "theme of life" in the book of Revelation, other instances being the Book of Life in Revelation 21:27, and the Tree of Life in 22:2, 22:14 and 22:19. John R. W. Stott relates this theme to Eternal Life in John 17:3: "And this is life eternal, that they should know thee the only true God, and him whom thou didst send, Jesus Christ".

== The Gospel of John ==
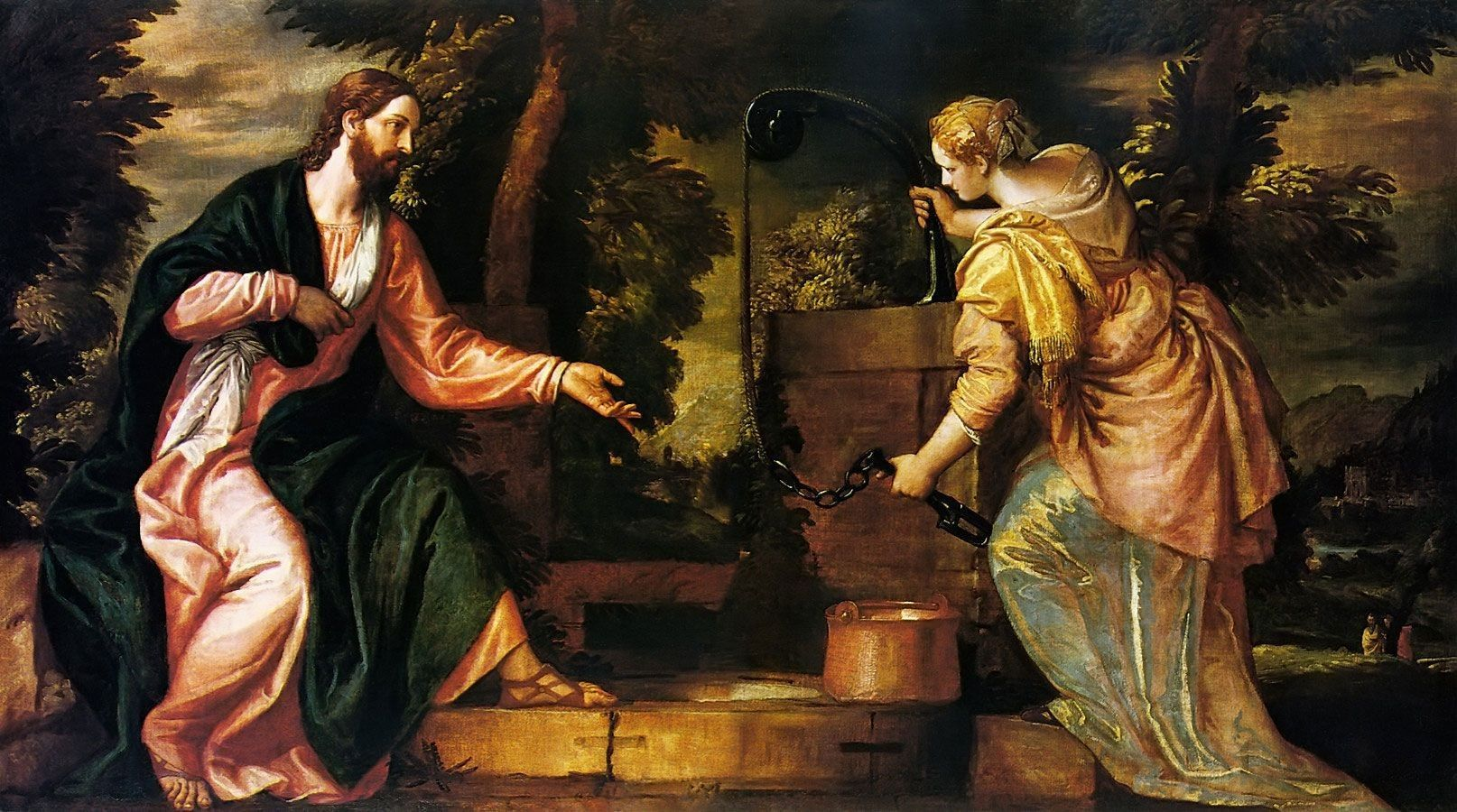
Jesus with the Samaritan woman at the well, by Paolo Veronese, 1585

In the Gospel of John some references to water, as in John 4:15, are traditionally identified as the Water of Life being the Holy Spirit.

The passages that comprise John 4:10–26, and relate the episode of the Samaritan woman are sometimes referred to as the "Water of Life Discourse". The Water of Life Discourse is the second among the seven discourses in the Gospel of John that pair with the seven signs in that gospel.

Another discourse, called the Bread of Life Discourse appears in John 6:22–59. On their own, each of the discourses on the Water of Life and the Bread of Life are key examples of "single theme discourses" in the Gospel of John. However, these two discourses in the Gospel of John complement each other to form the theme of "Christ as the Life".

According to W. E. Vine, this theme of "Christ as the Life" relates to John 5:26 where Jesus states: "Just as the Father has life in himself, so also he gave to his Son the possession of life in himself", reflecting the assertion of Jesus to have the power to give life, based on his relationship to the Eternal Father.

== See also ==
- Bread of Life Discourse
- Eternal life (Christianity)
- Farewell Discourse
- Life of Jesus in the New Testament
- Seven Spirits of God
- The bearer of the Water of Life
