= Burzinqa =

Mandaean turban

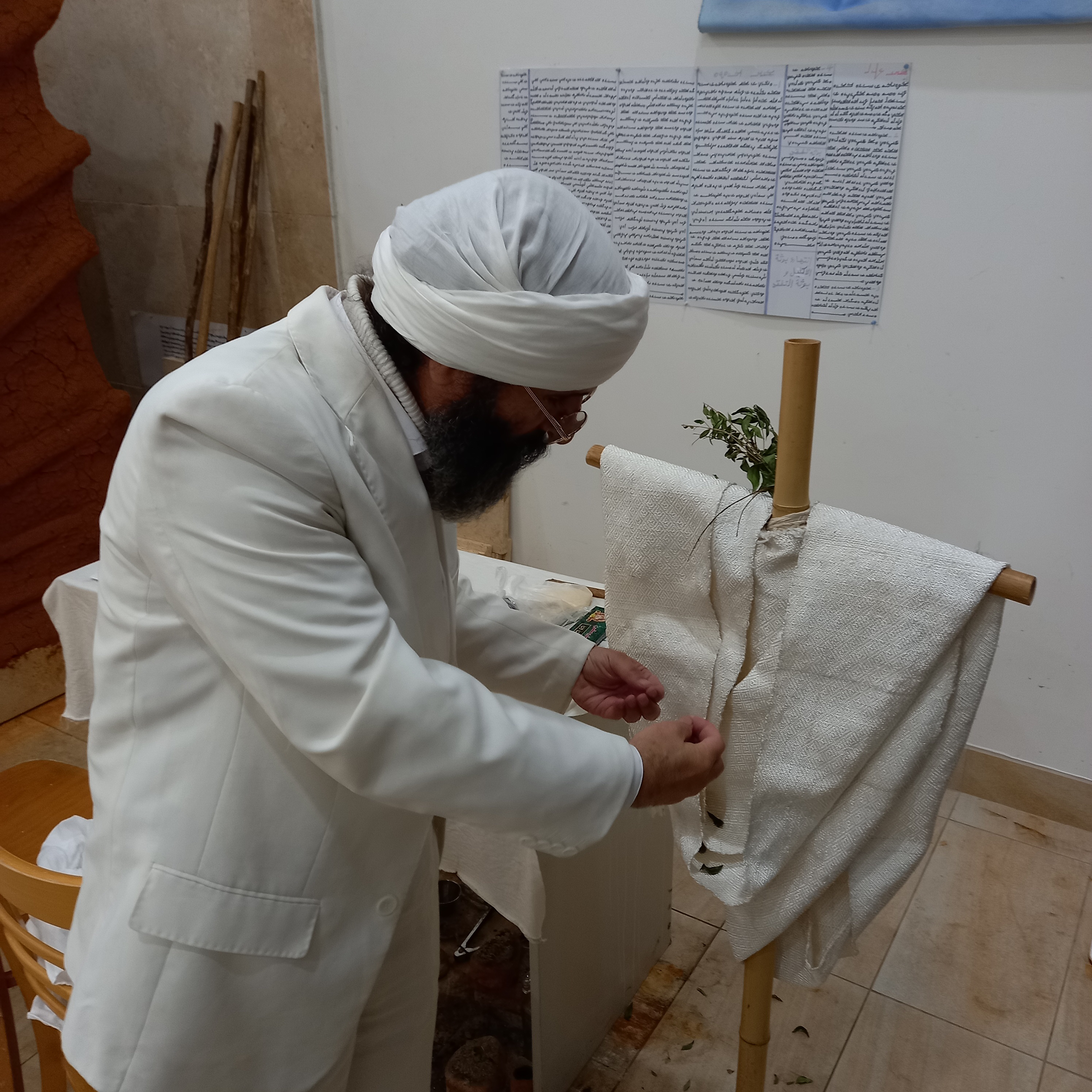
- Tarmida Sahi Bashikh wearing a burzinqa
- Type: turban
- Material: cloth
- Place of origin: southern Iraq and southwestern Iran

The burzinqa (Classical Mandaic: ࡁࡅࡓࡆࡉࡍࡒࡀ) is a turban worn by Mandaean men during baptismal ceremonial rituals. It forms the upper end of a lengthy piece of cotton cloth. For priests who are performing rituals, the loose lower end, called the rugza (Classical Mandaic: ࡓࡅࡂࡆࡀ), can be used as a pandama or mouth-veil.

== Description ==
The burzinqa consists of a long piece of cotton cloth that is wrapped three times around the head. The loose end is called the rugza (Classical Mandaic: ࡓࡅࡂࡆࡀ). It is made from a cloth that is 10 centimeters by 3 meters long, and can be cut lengthwise as needed.

== In the Qulasta ==
Several prayers in the Qulasta are recited when putting on the burzinqa, including prayers 1, 3, and 5.

== See also ==
- Mandaean priest § Clothing
- Pandama
