= Outline of Mandaeism =

Overview of and topical guide to Mandaeism

The following outline is provided as an overview of and topical guide to Mandaeism.

== People ==
- Mandaeans

=== Mandaean diaspora ===
- Mandaean Americans
- Mandaean Australians
- Mandaeans in Sweden

=== Historical identities ===
- Essenes
- Gnostics
- Sabians
- Nasoraeans

=== Related groups ===
- Kentaeans
- Elcesaites
- Ebionites
- Borborites
- Euchites
- Quqites
- Archontics
- Bana'im
- Hemerobaptists
- Maghāriya

=== Names ===
- Mandaean name
- Family names
  - Choheili
  - Khaffagi
  - Manduia

=== Mandaean priests ===
- Mandaean priest
  - List of Mandaean priests
- Titles and rankings
  - Rishama (patriarch)
  - Ganzibra (senior priest)
  - Tarmida (junior priest)
- Assistant roles
  - Shganda (priestly assistant; acolyte)
- Institutions
  - Mandaean Council of Ahvaz
  - Sabian Mandaean Association in Australia

==== Individual priests ====
- First millennium CE
  - Shlama beth Qidra
  - Zazai of Gawazta
  - Anush bar Danqa
- 19th century
  - Yahya Bihram
  - Ram Zihrun
  - Bibia Mudalal
- 20th century
  - Abdullah Khaffagi
  - Negm bar Zahroon
  - Abdullah bar Negm
  - Abdullah bar Sam
  - Dakhil Aidan
  - Jabbar Choheili
- Living people
  - Salah Choheili
  - Najah Choheili
  - Taleb Doraji
  - Khaldoon Majid Abdullah
  - Sattar Jabbar Hilow
  - Yuhana Nashmi
  - Sahi Bashikh
  - Brikha Nasoraia
  - Rafid al-Sabti
  - Salwan Alkhamas

=== Notable Mandaeans (non-priests) ===
- Nasser Sobbi
- Dakhil Shooshtary
- Lamia Abbas Amara
- Abdul Jabbar Abdullah
- Sinan Abdullah
- Zahroun Amara
- Salem Choheili

== Literature ==
- List of Mandaic manuscripts

=== Main texts ===
- Ginza Rabba
  - Right Ginza
  - Left Ginza
  - Huntington MS 6
- Mandaean Book of John

=== Prayers ===
- Qulasta (prayerbook)
  - List of Qulasta prayers
  - Codex Marshall 691
  - Sidra d-Nishmata
  - Niana
  - Rushma
  - Asut Malkia
  - Rahma
- Tabahatan
- Shal Shulta
- Shumhata
- King of Kings
- Kd azil bhira dakia

=== Priestly texts ===
- The Thousand and Twelve Questions
- Scroll of Exalted Kingship
- The Coronation of the Great Shishlam
- The Wedding of the Great Shishlam
- Alma Rišaia Rba
- Alma Rišaia Zuṭa
- Zihrun Raza Kasia
- Scroll of the Parwanaya
- Scroll of the Great Baptism
- Scroll of the Ancestors
- The Baptism of Hibil Ziwa
- Scroll of Abatur
- Dmut Kušṭa
- Secrets of the Ancestors
- Scroll of the Rivers
- Book of the Zodiac

=== Historical texts ===
- Haran Gawaita

=== Apotropaic texts ===
- Incantation bowls
- Lead rolls
- MS Drower 43

=== Manuscript collections ===
- Drower Collection
- Rbai Rafid Collection

== Cosmology ==
- Mandaean cosmology

=== Intermediary realms ===
- Tibil (Earth)
  - Yardna (river)
- Matarta (purgatory)
- Hitfun (a dividing river)
- Shahrat (a light-ship)
- Shatrin (a tree in limbo)

=== World of Light ===
- World of Light
  - Hayyi Rabbi (Supreme Deity)
  - Shkina (celestial dwelling)
  - Piriawis (celestial river)
  - Anana (cloud)
  - Gufna (vine)
  - Ziwa (radiance)
  - Mshunia Kushta (heavenly world of ideal counterparts)
  - Tarwan (a "pure land")
  - Yasana (a heavenly gate)

==== Uthras ====
- Uthra (angelic or celestial being)
  - Yushamin (Second Life)
  - Abatur (Third Life)
  - Ptahil (Fourth Life)
  - Hibil (Abel)
  - Shitil (Seth)
  - Anush (Enosh)
  - Sam Ziwa (Shem)
  - Manda d-Hayyi ("Gnosis of Life")
  - Shilmai
  - Nidbai
  - Adathan and Yadathan
  - Yufin-Yufafin
  - Urfeil and Marfeil
  - Tar and Tarwan
  - Bihram
  - Zihrun
  - Etinsib Ziwa
  - Nbat
  - Nsab
  - Gubran
  - Shihlun
  - Yura
  - Yurba
  - Yukabar
  - Yukashar
  - Yawar Ziwa
  - Simat Hayyi ("Treasure of Life")
  - Saureil

=== World of Darkness ===
- World of Darkness
  - Sea of Suf (a dividing sea)
  - Siniawis (a river)
  - Jesus in Mandaeism (Mshiha)

==== Demons ====
- Demons in Mandaeism
  - Ruha ("Spirit")
  - Ur (Leviathan)
  - Krun
  - Gaf
  - Qin
  - Anathan
  - Shdum
  - Giu
  - Hag and Mag
  - Zartai-Zartanai
  - Zahreil
- Planets (part of the entourage of Ruha)
  - Shamish (Sun)
  - Libat (Venus)
  - Nbu (Mercury)
  - Sin (Moon)
  - Kiwan (Saturn)
  - Bil (Jupiter)
  - Nirig (Mars)

== Important figures ==
- Adam
- Seth
- Abel
- Enosh
- Noah
- Shem
- Miriai
- Elizabeth
- John the Baptist
- Legendary and prototypical figures
  - Dinanukht
  - Shishlam
  - Ezlat

== Concepts ==
- Kushta (truth)
- Manda (gnosis)
- Laufa (communion)
- Dmuta (image)
- Nishimta (soul)
- Ruha (spirit)
- Mana (mind)
- Adam Kasia (hidden Adam)
- Adam Pagria (bodily Adam)

== Objects and symbols ==
- Drabsha (banner)
- Misha (oil)
- Riha (incense)
- Skandola (talisman seal)

== Ritual food and drink ==
=== Sacramental drinks ===
- Mambuha (drinking wateṛ)
- Halalta (rinsing water)
- Hamra (macerated grape juice)

=== Sacramental foods ===
- Pihta (flatbread, may be salted on unsalted)
- Fatira (unsalted half-baked biscuit)
- Sa (rolled up flatbread with nuts and raisins)

=== Sacramental meals ===
- Dukrana
- Lofani
- Zidqa brikha

== Clothing ==
- Rasta (robe)
- Burzinqa (turban)
- Pandama (mouth-veil)
- Himiana (girdle)
- Margna (staff)
- Klila (wreath)
- Taga (crown)

== Rituals and practices ==
- Masbuta (baptism)
- Tamasha (triple ablution)
- Rishama (minor ablution)
- Masiqta (death mass)
- Qabin (wedding)
- Brakha (prayer)
- Bshuma (formula)
- Sauma (fasting)
- Zidqa (almsgiving)
- Naming

== Buildings and structures ==
- Mandi
  - Sabian–Mandaean Mandi of Baghdad, Iraq
  - Ganzibra Dakhil Mandi, Australia
  - Yahya Yuhana Mandi, Australia
  - Wallacia Mandi, Australia
- Shkinta
- Andiruna

== Calendar ==
- Mandaean calendar

=== Feasts ===
- Dehwa Rabba (New Year)
- Feast of the Great Shishlam ("Little New Year")
- Dehwa Hanina ("Little Feast")
- Abu al-Haris (commemoration of Noah's flood)
- Parwanaya (5-day intercalary feast)
- Dehwa Daimana (birthday of John the Baptist)

=== Months ===
1. Daula
2. Nuna
3. ʿmbra
4. Taura
5. Ṣilmia
6. Sarṭana
7. Aria
8. Šumbulta
9. Qaina
10. Arqba
11. Hiṭia
12. Gadia

=== Epochs ===
1. Adam and Eve
2. Ram and Rud
3. Shurbai and Sharhabeil
4. Noah and Nuraita

== Language ==
- Mandaic language
- Neo-Mandaic
- Mandaic alphabet
- Mandaic (Unicode block)

== Academic research ==
- Mandaean studies
- Related disciplines
  - Aramaic studies
  - Semitic studies
  - Middle Eastern studies
  - Oriental studies
  - Syriac studies
  - Assyriology
  - Iranian studies
  - Religious studies

=== Publications ===
- ARAM Periodical (academic journal)

=== Scholars of Mandaeism ===
==== 17th century ====
- Ignatius of Jesus

==== 19th century ====
- Julius Euting
- Jacques de Morgan
- Theodor Nöldeke
- Matthias Norberg
- Julius Heinrich Petermann
- Nicolas Siouffi
- John George Taylor

==== 20th century ====
- E. S. Drower
- Mark Lidzbarski
- Rudolf Macúch
- Richard August Reitzenstein
- Kurt Rudolph
- Eric Segelberg
- Edwin M. Yamauchi

==== 21st century ====
- Jorunn Jacobsen Buckley
- Bogdan Burtea
- Carlos Gelbert
- Charles G. Häberl
- Edmondo Lupieri
- Majid Fandi Al-Mubaraki
- James F. McGrath
- Matthew Morgenstern
- Brikha Nasoraia
- Rafid al-Sabti
