= Ruha =

Figure in Mandaean cosmology

- Other names: Namrus, Ewath
- Abode: World of Darkness

Genealogy
- Parents: Qin
- Siblings: Zahreil
- Consort: Gaf
- Offspring: Ur, Seven Planets (Šuba), Twelve Constellations (Trisar)

In Mandaeism, Rūha (Classical Mandaic: ࡓࡅࡄࡀ, lit. 'spirit/breath', Modern Mandaic pronunciation: [ˈruha]), also known as Namrūs or Hiwat (Ewath; Classical Mandaic: ࡏࡅࡀࡕ) is a significant cosmic figure, often depicted as the queen of the World of Darkness (alma ḏ-hšuka) or underworld. She rules the underworld together with her son Ur, the king of the World of Darkness, and her entourage of the seven planets and twelve constellations, who are also her offspring with Ur.

Ruha is the daughter of Qin, the Mistress of Darkness in the first underworld. She is the ruler of the third maṭarta (watch-house or purgatory).

Cognates exist in other Semitic religious traditions, such as the Arabic rūḥ (روح), a fundamental concept in Islam signifying "spirit" or "soul", referring to the divine breath of life, as well as the Hebrew ruach (רוח), meaning "spirit," "wind," or "breath," and Ruach HaKodesh (רוח הקודש), which denotes the "Holy Spirit" in Judaism.

== Names and epithets ==
The Ginza Rabba refers to Ruha using various epithets, such as:

- Rūha Masṭanita "Ruha the Seductress"
- Rūha ḏ-Qudša "Holy Spirit"
- ḏ-Libat ʿstra Amamit "Libat-Ishtar-Amamit" (i.e., Venus)

Use of the term "Holy Spirit" for Ruha is primarily confined to polemical texts, and not found in esoteric or ritual scrolls.

Other epithets mentioned in the Ginza Rabba are:

- Amamit
- Namrus (Nimrus)
- Qananit (in Right Ginza Book 6, i.e. the Book of Dinanukht)
- Dayum (in Left Ginza 3.27)

Gelbert (2013) connects the name Ruha to the city Urha (Edessa), although this hypothesis has not been peer reviewed.

== Children ==
Rūha bears a son called Ur with Gaf, one of the giants in the World of Darkness described in book 5 of the Ginza Rabba. She then commits incest with Ur, giving birth to the seven planets and twelve zodiacs (listed below).

Twelve Constellations (trisar malwašia)

- Daula (Aquarius)
- Nuna (Pisces)
- ʿmbra (Aries)
- Taura (Taurus)
- Ṣilmia (Gemini)
- Sarṭana (Cancer)
- Aria (Leo)
- Šumbulta (Virgo)
- Qaina (Libra)
- Arqba (Scorpio)
- Hiṭia (Sagittarius)
- Gadia (Capricorn)

Seven Planets (šuba šibiahia)

- Shamish (Sun)
- Libat (Venus)
- Nbu (Mercury)
- Sin (Moon)
- Kiwan (Saturn)
- Bil (Jupiter)
- Nirig (Mars)

== Cosmological role ==
According to Jorunn Jacobsen Buckley, Ruha is a complex character who cannot simply be portrayed as an evil archon.

=== Captivity and role in creation ===
As part of his descent to the World of Darkness, Hibil Ziwa leads Ruha out of the World of Darkness, claiming to lead her to her parents in the world above, and seals her in a world belonging to neither light nor darkness. When sealed in this world, she gives birth to Ur. Whereas Ur wishes to wage war against the World of Light, viewed in Ruha's mirror, Ruha discourages this intent. Hibil confiscates this mirror and binds Ur in chains, noting that Hayyi Rabbi had sent him in anger against Ur.

Ruha sleeps with Ur in a futile attempt to liberate him, giving birth to the seven planets and twelve signs of the Zodiac, with whom she expresses dissatisfaction. Ruha and Ptahil both play a role in creation, with each gaining control when the other's power subsides, but cannot animate mankind with a soul, despite providing him with their own mysteries, since Ruha represents the ambivalent "spirit" element rather than the light-world "soul" element. Adam is made after Ptahil's image, while Hawa (Eve) is made either after Adam's image or after Ruha's, depending on account. When Adam dies and ascends to the World of Life, Ruha tempts Eve to mourn his loss, and laments her own lack of gnosis of the treasures of salvation; when Eve dies and is led to the World of Light by Hibil, Ruha bewails that Hibil takes from her everything which is desirable, leaving only that which is worthless.

=== Founding of Jerusalem and interaction with envoys ===
Ruha, in command of her sons the seven planets, including Adonai (Shamish), sets out to build Jerusalem. Anush Uthra admonishes that 365 Mandaeans will arise in the city, but Ruha goes ahead with its construction, erecting its seven pillars. Anush preaches Mandaeism in Jerusalem and gains a following converting Jews to Mandaeism; due to this, the Jews persecute and kill the Mandaeans, leading Anush to plan to destroy the city in retribution. Ruha futilely begs Anush for a compromise, first for him not to destroy her city, then for her to be permitted to aid him in the destruction by collapsing the walls upon the Jews, killing them; Anush accepts neither plea. Although Adonai is depicted under Ruha's sway, the Haran Gawaita indicates the Mandaeans loved Adonai while in Jerusalem until the birth of Jesus.

Ruha's other interactions with lightworld envoys such as Hibil Ziwa and Manda d-Hayyi are often more positive, where Ruha is rebuked but empowered, obtaining guidelines for her own salvation.

=== Redemption ===
In chapter 68 of the Mandaean Book of John, Manda d-Hayyi retrieves Kanath-Niṭufta (translated by Charles G. Häberl and James F. McGrath as "Droplet Steady") from the World of Darkness, who remains at the outer wall until summoned further under various epithets, including Marganita-Niṭufta (Droplet Pearl) and Simat-Hayyi-Niṭufta (Droplet Life's Treasure). Buckley notes that some of these names appear as epithets of Ruha in the illustrated Diwan Abatur (an observation which had been noticed, but dismissed as a confusion, by Mark Lidzbarski), and that the names Simat Hayyi (Life's Treasure) and Niṭufta (Drop), are names used for the consort of Hayyi Rabbi in the World of Light.

Buckley interprets a passage in the Qulasta referring to Simat Hayyi coming forth from the World of Darkness and eventually being raised to the Place of Light as referring to Ruha, noting that E. S. Drower had interpreted it in reference to Zahreil, but arguing that Zahreil never left the World of Darkness. Buckley therefore argues that the Mandaean texts consider Ruha will eventually attain redemption, and merge with her dmutha (ideal counterpart) in the World of Light.

=== Revealer of gnosis ===
Buckley notes that Ruha's insights while still in Tibil (Earth) reflect the insights of a Mandaean gnostic.

In Book 6 (also known as the "Book of Dinanukt") of the Right Ginza, Ruha makes a speech similar to the Gnostic poem The Thunder, Perfect Mind. Part of the speech is given as an excerpt below.

I am the Life that was from the beginning.
I am the Truth (kušṭa) which existed even earlier in the beginning.
I am radiance; I am light.
I am death; I am life.
I am darkness; I am light.
I am error; I am truth.
I am destruction; I am construction.
I am light; I am error.
I am blow; I am healing.
I am the elevated man who is older and who was there before the builder of heaven and earth.
I have no peers among kings, and there is as yet no crown in my kingdom.
There is no human being who can give me a message in the foggy clouds of darkness.

– Translated by Buckley (2002) from Lidzbarski (1925), Right Ginza 6, p. 207, lines 34–42.

== As the spirit ==
Ruha can also mean 'spirit', which is roughly equivalent to pneuma or "breath" in Greek philosophy. It is distinct from the nišimta, or incarnate soul. In Mandaeism, humans are considered to be made up of the physical body (pagra), soul (nišimta), and spirit (ruha).

== Parallels ==
The story of Ruha in Mandaeism is one of the parallels to the Gnostic story of Sophia falling out of the pleroma. Ruha at first dwells in the World of Light, until she "falls" and bears her son Ur. However, the conflict arising from seeking to create without the consent of the supreme deity is attributed to Yushamin, the Second Life, and the origin of the demiurgic (Ptahil) is attributed to Abatur, the Third Life.

== See also ==
- Krun
- Holy Spirit
- Rūḥ (Arabic cognate)
- Nishimta, the soul in Mandaeism
