= Mandaean calendar =

Solar calendar used by the Mandaeans

The Mandaean calendar is a 365-day solar calendar used by the Mandaean people. It consists of twelve 30-day months, with five extra days at the end of Šumbulta (the 8th month). The Parwanaya (or Panja) festival takes place during those five days. Since there is no leap year, every four years, all Mandaean dates (like beginnings of the months or festivals) move one day back with respect to the Gregorian calendar.

== Months ==
Each month (iahra or yahra) is named after a constellation (manzalta). The Mandaic names of the twelve constellations of the Zodiac are derived from common Aramaic roots. As with the seven planets, the constellations, frequently known as the trisar (Classical Mandaic: ࡕࡓࡉࡎࡀࡓ, "The Twelve") or trisar malwašia ("Twelve Constellations") in Mandaic texts, are generally not viewed favorably since they constitute part of the entourage of Ruha, the Queen of the World of Darkness, who is also their mother.

There is also another alternative set of names for the Mandaean months cognate with the month names found in the Babylonian and Hebrew calendars.

Order of month	Constellation	Written Mandaic name	Mandaic script	Modern Mandaic pronunciation	Alternative name of month
1	Aquarius	Daula	ࡃࡀࡅࡋࡀ	Dawlā	Šabaṭ
2	Pisces	Nuna	ࡍࡅࡍࡀ	Nunā	Adar
3	Aries	ʿmbra	ࡏࡌࡁࡓࡀ	Embərā	Nisan
4	Taurus	Taura	ࡕࡀࡅࡓࡀ	Tawrā	Ayar
5	Gemini	Ṣilmia	ࡑࡉࡋࡌࡉࡀ	Ṣelmi	Siwan
6	Cancer	Sarṭana	ࡎࡀࡓࡈࡀࡍࡀ	Ṣ/Sarṭānā	Tamuz/Tammuz
7	Leo	Aria	ࡀࡓࡉࡀ	Aryā	Ab
8	Virgo	Šumbulta	ࡔࡅࡌࡁࡅࡋࡕࡀ	Šomboltā	Aylul
9	Libra	Qaina	ࡒࡀࡉࡍࡀ	Qaynā	Tišrin
10	Scorpio	Arqba	ࡀࡓࡒࡁࡀ	Arqəwā	Mašrwan
11	Sagittarius	Hiṭia	ࡄࡉࡈࡉࡀ	Heṭyā	Kanun
12	Capricorn	Gadia	ࡂࡀࡃࡉࡀ	Gadyā	Ṭabit

Each month consists of exactly 30 days. The Parwanaya festival comes between the 8th month (Šumbulta) and 9th month (Qaina) to make up for 5 extra days in the solar calendar.

Due to a lack of a leap year included in the Mandaean calendar, dates change by one day every four years with respect to the Gregorian calendar. Currently, for example in 2022 CE, Sarṭana, meaning Cancer, corresponds to December / January in the Gregorian calendar, instead of June / July.

== Days and hours ==
The hours of the day are counted starting at dawn (ṣipra), although Mandaeans formerly counted the hours of the day starting at sunset or evening (paina). In Mandaic, a 24-hour day is known as a yuma, daytime as ʿumama, and nighttime as lilia. An hour is called a šaia, 5 minutes is called a šuša, and a minute is called a pigia.

Some days are considered to be auspicious, while others are ominous (mbaṭṭal).

The days of the week are as follows. Habšaba (Sunday) is considered to be the first day of the week.

Day of the week	English	Mandaic
1	Sunday	Habšaba (ࡄࡀࡁࡔࡀࡁࡀ)
2	Monday	Trin Habšaba (ࡕࡓࡉࡍ ࡄࡀࡁࡔࡀࡁࡀ)
3	Tuesday	Tlata Habšaba (ࡕࡋࡀࡕࡀ ࡄࡀࡁࡔࡀࡁࡀ)
4	Wednesday	Arba Habšaba (ࡀࡓࡁࡀ ࡄࡀࡁࡔࡀࡁࡀ)
5	Thursday	Hamša Habšaba (ࡄࡀࡌࡔࡀ ࡄࡀࡁࡔࡀࡁࡀ)
6	Friday	Yuma ḏ-Rahaṭia (ࡉࡅࡌࡀ ࡃ ࡓࡀࡄࡀࡈࡉࡀ)
7	Saturday	Yuma ḏ-Šafta (Šapta (ࡔࡀࡐࡕࡀ))

== Seasons ==
The four seasons are as follows, with the year starting with winter. The three months of each season, given below, are also referred to in Mandaic as the beginning, middle, or end of the season.

- sitwa (winter): Daula, Nuna, ʿmbra
- abhar (spring): Taura, Ṣilmia, Ṣarṭana
- giṭa (summer): Aria, Šumbulta, Qaina
- paiz (autumn): Arqba, Hiṭia, Gadia

== Years ==
A Mandaean year is called a šidta.

The Mandaean calendar is calculated from the year that Adam was born, or approximately 443,370 BCE. Charles G. Häberl calculates the date 18 July 2019 CE as corresponding to 1 Dowla 481,343 AA (AA = after the creation of Adam). The latter half of 2024 would correspond to 481,348 AA.

All Mandaean years consist of exactly 365 days (12 regular months of 30 days each, plus the 5 intercalary days of the Parwanaya). Since Mandaean months do not have leap years accounted for every four years, seasons "slip back" and will not correspond to the same Gregorian months over time.

== World chronology ==
A chronology of the world according to Book 18 of the Right Ginza is as follows.

- 216,001 AA – first cataclysm: destruction and pestilence
- 372,001 AA – second cataclysm: flame and fire
- 472,001 AA – third cataclysm: flood
- 478,001 AA – founding of Jerusalem
- 478,401 AA – birth of Jesus (Ešu Mšiha)
- 479,853 AA – rise of the Arab kings
- 530,001 AA – green waters; final cataclysm; Bil (Jupiter) assumes the throne of Ptahil.
- 530,043 AA – the end of the worlds: Ur (Leviathan) devours Tibil and the planets, while "splendor and light" (ziwa u-nhura) are created.

== Epochs ==
According to Book 18 of the Right Ginza, there are four epochs (or eras; Classical Mandaic: dara) of the world, which is given a duration of 480,000 years.

1. Epoch of Adam and Hawa: 1st generation of humans (216,000 years; 30 generations according to Right Ginza Book 1)
2. Epoch of Ram and Rud: 2nd generation of humans (156,000 years; 25 generations according to Right Ginza Book 1)
3. Epoch of Šurbai and Šarhabʿil: 3rd generation of humans (100,000 years; 15 generations according to Right Ginza Book 1)
4. Epoch of Noah and his wife Nuraita/Nhuraita (current and final epoch): 4th generation of humans (remaining years, which would be 8,000 years if taking the 480,000 years into account)

== Festivals ==
Mandaean festivals are:

- Parwanaya: Five days that Hayyi Rabbi created the angels and the universe. The 5 epagomenals (extra days) inserted at the end of every Šumbulta (the 8th month) constitute the Parwanaya intercalary feast.
- Dehwa Daimana or Dehwa Daymaneh (Dihba ḏ-Yamana, Dihba Daimana, or Dihba Rba ḏ-Daima): Birthday of John the Baptist. Children are baptized for the first time during this festival.
- Kanshi u-Zahli: New Year's Eve
- Dehwa Rabba: New Year's Day
- Feast of the Great Shishlam (Classical Mandaic: ࡃࡉࡄࡁࡀ ࡖࡔࡉࡔࡋࡀࡌ ࡓࡁࡀ) or Nauruz Zūṭa (ࡍࡀࡅࡓࡅࡆ ࡆࡅࡈࡀ): Little New Year, on the 6th-7th days of Daula, corresponding to Epiphany in Christianity. The Night of Power takes place on the night of the 6th day (similar to Qadr Night), during which the heavenly gates of Abatur are open to the faithful. Priests visit Mandaean households and give them myrtle wreaths to hang on their houses for the rest of the year to protect against evil. The households also donate alms to the priests.
- Dehwa Hanina (Classical Mandaic: ࡃࡉࡄࡁࡀ ࡄࡀࡍࡉࡍࡀ, romanized: Dihba Hanina) or Dehwa Ṭurma (Dihba ḏ-Tirma): the Little Feast, begins on the 18th day of Taura. This holiday commemorates the ascension of Hibil Ziwa from the underworld to the Lightworld. The feast lasts for three days. On the first day, Mandaean families visit each other and have a special breakfast of rice, yogurt, and dates. Baptisms are performed, and the dead are commemorated with lofani (ritual meals).
- Ead Fel (Classical Mandaic: ࡐࡉࡋ, romanized: Fil): Crushed dates with roasted sesame seeds (shoshma) are eaten.
- Abū al-Harīs (Arabic: أبو الهريس) or Ashoriya (Classical Mandaic: ࡀࡔࡅࡓࡉࡄ, romanized: Ašurih), "day of remembrance": on the 1st day of the 6th month, Sarṭana. Day of remembrance for the drowned people of Noah's flood. Grains and cereals are eaten as part of a special lofani. Mandaeans believe that on this day, Noah and his son Sam made the food of forgiveness of sins for the souls of those who died in the flood. The food of forgiveness consists of seven grains representing the seven days of the week, and from the grounding of these seven grains came the name Abū al-Harīs. (See Ashure or Noah's pudding.)

== Example calendar ==
Below is an example of a calendar year for the Mandaean year 445375, which corresponds to the Gregorian calendar years 2005–2006 or Jewish calendar year 5766 (Gelbert 2005: 274). Fasting (Classical Mandaic: ࡑࡀࡅࡌࡀ, romanized: ṣauma) is practiced on some days.

No.	Mandaean month	Gregorian month	Festival(s)
1	Dowla	July / August	1st and 2nd day of Dowla: the New Year – Dehwa Rabba; 6th and 7th day of Dowla: festival of Šišlam Rabba (festival of trees). Eating meat, fish and eggs is not permitted.
2	Nuna	August / September	25th of Nuna: light fasting
3	Ambero	September / October	
4	Towra	October / November	1st of Toura: Memorial Day (Ead Fel); 2nd, 3rd, and 4th of Toura: light fasting 18th of Towra: Dehwa Hanina (celebration of the completed creation)
5	Selmi	November / December	
6	Saratana	December / January	1st of Saratana: Noah returned to dry land (Ashoriya); 9th of Saratana: light fasting 15th of Saratana: light fasting 23rd of Saratana: light fasting
7	Aria	January / February	
8	Shumbolta	February / March	From 26th to 30th of Shumbolta: full fasting
(Panja)	(Panja)		Panja or Parwanaya – 5 intercalary days: days of remembrance (or "days without night"). Single and group baptizing (masbuta) is permitted. Eating bread with yeast is not allowed.
9	Qina	March / April	1st of Qina: light fasting
10	Arqwa	April / May	
11	Heṭia	May / June	1st of Heṭia: Dehwa Daimana (birthday of Yehya Yehanna).
12	Gadia	June / July	28th and 29th of Gadia: light fasting 30th of Gadia (New Year's Eve): Kanshiy u-Zahly (cleaning and washing the whole household, baptism and buying new clothes). At sunset, Mandaeans will close their doors and stay inside for 36 hours to commemorate the assembly of the angels in heaven.

Below are some Mandaean holiday dates for 2024:

- March 13-17 – Parwanaya
- May 17 – Dehwa Daymaneh
- July 15 – Kanshi u-Zahli
- July 16 – Dehwa Rabba
- October 14 – Ead Fel
- October 31 – Dehwa Hanina
- December 13 – Ashoriya (Abu al-Haris)

Every four years, the dates are shifted back by one day, since the Mandaean calendar lacks a leap day. As a result, Mandaean holiday dates for 2028 are:

- March 12-16 – Parwanaya
- May 16 – Dehwa Daymaneh
- July 14 – Kanshi u-Zahli
- July 15 – Dehwa Rabba
- October 13 – Ead Fel
- October 30 – Dehwa Hanina
- December 12 – Ashoriya (Abu al-Haris)

== Calendar makers ==
Dakhil Shooshtary, an Iranian-American Mandaean, was known for making Mandaean calendars.

== See also ==
- Assyrian calendar
- Babylonian calendar
- Iranian calendars
- Hebrew calendar
- Intercalary month (Egypt)
