= Dehwa Hanina =

Mandaean religious feast

- Also called: Dihba Hanina, Dihba Hnina, Dehwa Ṭurma, Dihba ḏ-Ṭirma
- Observed by: Mandaeans
- Type: Religious
- Significance: Little Feast celebrating Hibil Ziwa's ascent from the underworld

In the Mandaean calendar, Dehwa Hanina (Classical Mandaic: ࡃࡉࡄࡁࡀ ࡄࡍࡉࡍࡀ, romanized: Dihba Hnina) or Dehwa Ṭurma (Dihba ḏ-Ṭirma), the Little Feast, is celebrated on the 18th day of Taura, which is the 4th month of the Mandaean calendar that corresponds to the Hebrew month Iyar.

Dehwa Hanina commemorates the ascension of Hibil Ziwa from the underworld (World of Darkness) to the World of Light. Mandaean families visit each other and have a special breakfast of rice, yogurt, dates, and sesame seeds. Baptisms are performed, and the dead are commemorated with lofani (ritual meals). Mandaean families also clean their houses, wear new clothes, light candles, burn incense, and pray.

== Symbolism ==
The festival symbolizes three things:

- The victory of light over darkness, and the re-balancing of the universe
- Creation of light and life on Tibil, and the birth of Ptahil from the marriage of Hibil and Zahriel
- The masiqta of Gabriel: baptizing him 360 times before re-entering the World of Light

== See also ==
- Hibil
- Katabasis § Trip into the underworld
