= Mandaean cosmology =

Conception of the universe in the religion of Mandaeism

Mandaean cosmology is the Gnostic conception of the universe in the religion of Mandaeism.

Mandaean cosmology is strongly influenced by ancient Near Eastern cosmology, broadly speaking, and Jewish, Babylonian, Persian, Greek, Manichaean, and other Near Eastern religions and philosophies in particular.

== Emanations ==
The three major Emanations or "Lives" (Hayyi) in Mandaeism are:

1. The Second Life: Yushamin, the primal uthra
2. The Third Life: Abatur, the weigher of souls, and also the father of the uthri (plural of uthra)
3. The Fourth Life: Ptahil, the creator of the material world

The Second Life, Third Life, and Fourth Life are emanations of the First Life, Hayyi Rabbi (the Supreme God).

== Realms ==
Mandaean cosmology divides the universe into three realms:

1. World of Light or Lightworld (alma ḏ-nhūra)
2. Tibil, or Earth
3. World of Darkness or underworld (alma ḏ-hšuka)

According to Book 3 of the Right Ginza, a "fruit (pira) within the fruit" and "ether (ayar) within the ether" had existed before the World of Light came into being. In a sort of "Big Bang," the World of Light comes into being along with the Great Jordan and uthras. Tibil and the World of Darkness are then formed by Ptahil and others after the World of Light came into existence.

=== World of Light ===
The World of Light is the primeval, transcendent world from which Tibil and the World of Darkness emerged. The Great Life (Hayyi Rabbi or Supreme God/Monad) and his uthras dwell in the World of Light. The World of Light is also the source of Piriawis, the Great Yardena (Classical Mandaic: ࡉࡀࡓࡃࡍࡀ, romanized: iardna), or "Jordan" of Life.

In Mandaean cosmology, ether (Mandaic: aiar or ayar) permeates outer space and the World of Light. Uthras travel by moving through ether. The Father is also sometimes mentioned as Ayar Rba ('Great Ether') or Ayar Ziwa ('Radiant Ether'). In Mandaeism, the "outer ether" (aiar baraia), mentioned in texts such as The Thousand and Twelve Questions, refers to the ether that permeates the cosmos, while the "inner ether" (aiar gawaia) refers to the "breath or pure air of Life within the soul".

The Mshunia Kushta is a section of the World of Light where spiritual counterparts or images called dmuta are found.

When a Mandaean person dies, priests perform elaborate death rituals or death masses called masiqta in order to help guide the soul (nišimta) towards the World of Light. In order to pass from Tibil (Earth) to the World of Light, the soul must go through multiple maṭarta (watch-stations, toll-stations, or purgatories; see also Arcs of Descent and Ascent and araf (Islam)) before finally being reunited with the dmuta, the soul's heavenly counterpart.

The Scroll of Abatur mentions a heavenly tree called Shatrin (Šatrin) where the souls of unbaptized Mandaean children are temporarily nourished for 30 days. On the 30th day, Hibil Ziwa baptizes the souls of the children, who then continue on to the World of Light. The tree has a length of 360,000 parasangs according to the Scroll of Abatur.

The idea has some parallels with the Gnostic concept of pleroma.

=== Tibil ===
Tibil, or Earth, is the middle, earthly realm in Mandaean cosmology. It is separated form the World of Light above and the World of Darkness below by ayar (aether). Rituals mediated by priests allow for a laufa (or laupa, meaning 'connection' or 'union') to be made from Tibil to the World of Light.

=== World of Darkness ===
The World of Darkness is ruled by its king Ur (Leviathan) and its queen Ruha, mother of the seven planets and twelve constellations. The great dark Sea of Suf lies in the World of Darkness. The great dividing river of Hiṭfon, analogous to the river Styx in Greek mythology, separates the World of Darkness from the World of Light.

== Directions ==
Mandaeism considers North, and hence also the North Pole and Polaris, to be auspicious and associated with the World of Light. Mandaeans face north when praying, and temples are also oriented towards the north. On the contrary, South is associated with the World of Darkness.

== Planets ==
Overall, the seven classical planets (Classical Mandaic: ࡔࡅࡁࡀ šuba, "The Seven"; Classical Mandaic: ࡔࡉࡁࡉࡀࡄࡉࡀ šibiahia, "planets"; or, combined, šuba šibiahia "Seven Planets") are generally not viewed favorably in Mandaeism, since they constitute part of the entourage of Ruha, the Queen of the World of Darkness who is also their mother. However, individually, some of the planets can be associated with positive qualities. The names of the seven planets in Mandaic are borrowed from Akkadian, and are also reflected in the same sequence in Jewish sources The other earliest reference and being in Mandaic is the sequence occurring on a lead amulet in Mandaic.

The planets are listed according to the traditional Mandaean order of the planets as given by Masco (2012).

Planet	Mandaic	Mandaic script	Akkadian	Other names	Associations
Sun	Šamiš	ࡔࡀࡌࡉࡔ	Šamaš	Adunai < Hebrew Adonai	light and life-powers Yawar-Ziwa (Dazzling Light) and Simat-Hiia (Treasure of Life); Yazuqaeans
Venus	Libat	ࡋࡉࡁࡀࡕ	Delebat	Amamit (the underworld goddess), Argiuat, Daitia, Kukbat (the diminutive of 'star'), Spindar, ʿstira (i.e., Ishtar or Astarte), and Ruha or Ruha ḏ-qudša (Holy Spirit)	success in love and reproduction
Mercury	Nbu (ʿNbu)	ࡍࡁࡅ ࡏࡍࡁࡅ	Nabû	Maqurpiil, Mšiha < Messiah; ʿaṭarid < Arabic	learning, scribes; Christ and Christianity
Moon	Sin	ࡎࡉࡍ	Sīnu	Agzʿil, Ṭaṭmʿil, Ṣaurʿil, and Sira	miscarriages and abnormal births
Saturn	Kiwan	ࡊࡉࡅࡀࡍ	Kajamānu	Br Šamiš ('Son of the Sun')	Jews; Saturday; Kentaeans
Jupiter	Bil	ࡁࡉࡋ	Bēlu	Angʿil	male; "hot and moist"
Mars	Nirig	ࡍࡉࡓࡉࡂ	Nergallu	Marik	violence; Islam

Each planet is said to be carried in a ship. Drawings of these ships, such as Shahrat, are found in various Mandaean scrolls, such as the Scroll of Abatur.

== Calendar and zodiac ==
The Mandaean calendar is a 365-day solar calendar used by the Mandaeans.

== Dual counterparts ==
In Mandaeism, people, spirits, and places are often considered to have both earthly and heavenly counterparts (dmuta), which dwell in the Mshunia Kushta ("Realm of Truth").

== See also ==
- Ancient Mesopotamian religion
- Babylonian astrology
- Babylonian astronomy
- Biblical cosmology
- Emanationism
- Gnosticism
- Jewish mythology
- Merkabah mysticism
- Seder hishtalshelus (emanations) in Jewish mysticism
- Sefirot (divine attributes) in Jewish mysticism
- Religion and mythology
- Religious cosmology
- Zoroastrian cosmology
