= Scroll of the Ancestors =

Mandaean text

Scroll of the Ancestors Šarḥ ḏ-Ṭabahata

Information
- Religion: Mandaeism
- Language: Mandaic language

The Scroll of the Ancestors (Classical Mandaic: ࡔࡀࡓࡇ ࡖࡈࡀࡁࡀࡄࡀࡕࡀ Šarḥ ḏ-Ṭabahata) is a Mandaean religious text that describes the rituals of the Ṭabahata (ancestors') masiqta, held during the 5-day Parwanaya festival.

== Manuscripts ==
Copies of the scroll include Manuscript 42 of the Drower Collection (DC 42), currently held at the Bodleian Library. The scroll was originally transcribed in 1743 and has 834 lines. It is similar to Prayer 170 of the Qulasta, but some names are different.

DC 42 verso, copied at Basra in 1248 A.H. (1832–3 A.D.), contains six texts:

- Šarḥ ḏ-ahaba ḏ-mania b-iuma ḏ-paruanaiia
- Aprišata ḏ-ahaba ḏ-mania
- Šarḥ ḏ-ahaba ḏ-mania ḏ-tarmida ʿu ganzibra kḏ napiq
- Šarḥ ḏ-ṭabahata qria b-šuma ḏ-gabrauʿnta
- Šarḥ ḏ-dukrana ḏ-šumaiia
- Šarḥ ḏ-zidqa brika ḏ-paruanaiia

== Ṭabahata Masiqta ==
The Ṭabahata Masiqta, or the "masiqta of the Parents", is held only once a year during the Parwanaya intercalary festival. Priests recite dozens of prayers, prepare 72 faṭiras (small, round, saltless, half-baked biscuits for ritual use) symbolizing ancestors, and also sacrifice a white dove, called ba, which symbolizes the spirit (ruha). According to The Thousand and Twelve Questions, this masiqta cannot be held at any other time other than during the Parwanaya. For a more detailed description of the Ṭabahata Masiqta according to the Scroll of the Ancestors, see chapter 8 in Buckley (2002).

Below is the Qulasta prayer sequence (i.e., order of prayers to be recited) for the Ṭabahata Masiqta, following the numbering in Drower's 1959 Canonical Prayerbook. Some of the prayers involve fatiras that must be signed by a priest, who dips it with four fingers, tips pressed together, into sacramental masiqta oil and signs the fatira with oil three times, from left to right (similar in some ways to the sign of the cross). The masiqta has 3 parts. The first two parts are known as the "Mother Masiqta," while the final part is known as the "Father Masiqta."

1st ritual: 60 faṭiras	2nd ritual: 6 faṭiras	3rd ritual: 6 faṭiras
		91
		96
		79
		80
33	33	33
		81
34	34	34
35	35	1
75–77	75–77	75–77
9	9	9
35	35	35
36–45	36–45	36–45
46–47	46–47	
48	48	48
49, signs	49, no signs at 6th	49, all 6 signed
50, signs	50, no signs	50
51, signs	51, no signs at 6th	51, all 6 signed
52, signs, except for last	52, no signs at 6th	52, all 6 signed
53 ("seal of the masiqta")	53	
49, with ḏ-abahatan	49	
44	44	
54, pihta in hamra	54	54
55, pihta swallowed	55	55
56, drinking halalta (rinsing water)	56	56
57–72	57–72	57–72
91	91–99	91–99
	71	70
	100	102
	71–72	71–72
		80
	101–103	101–102
	63	63
	108	58
	3	3
	9	
	58	58
	65	65
	71	76
	170 ("Ṭabahatan")	170 ("Ṭabahatan")

== See also ==
- Tabahatan
- List of Mandaic manuscripts
- Scroll of the Parwanaya
