= Dmuta =

Spiritual counterpart in Mandaean cosmology

In Mandaeism, a dmuta (Classical Mandaic: ࡃࡌࡅࡕࡀ, lit. 'image', Modern Mandaic pronunciation: [dəˈmutæ]) or dmut is a spiritual counterpart or "mirror image" in the World of Light. People, spirits, and places are often considered to have both earthly and heavenly counterparts (dmuta) that can dynamically interact with each other. A few examples include:

- The heavenly Adam Kasia corresponding to the earthly Adam Pagria
- The heavenly Piriawis (or "Great Jordan") corresponding to earthly yardnia (rivers)
- Abatur Rama ("Lofty Abatur") corresponding to Abatur Muzania ("Abatur of the Scales")

A dmuta dwells in the Mshunia Kushta, a section of the World of Light.

== Merging of the soul ==
A successful masiqta merges the incarnate soul (ࡍࡉࡔࡉࡌࡕࡀ nišimta) and spirit (ࡓࡅࡄࡀ ruha) from the Earth (Tibil) into a new merged entity in the World of Light called the ʿuṣṭuna. The ʿuṣṭuna can then reunite with its heavenly, non-incarnate counterpart (or spiritual image), the dmuta, in the World of Light, where it will reside in the world of ideal counterparts called the Mšunia Kušṭa (similar to Plato's idea of the hyperuranion).

== In the Qulasta ==
In Qulasta prayer 43, manda (gnosis) is mentioned as having proceeded from Dmut Hiia (the dmuta of Life). Prayers 170 (the Tabahatan) and 411 in the Qulasta mention Dmut Hiia as the mother of Yushamin.

== Parallels ==
Similarly, the Qur'an (36:36, 51:49, etc.) mentions that God created everything in "pairs." Related concepts in other religions include yin and yang in Taoism, and the Yazidi belief of there being both a heavenly and earthly Lalish.

Philosophical parallels include Plato's theory of forms.

== As an uthra ==
In the Scroll of Abatur, Dmut Hiia (or Dmut Hayyi) is depicted as a female uthra. The scroll also contains an illustration of Dmut Hiia.

== See also ==
- Dmut Kušṭa
- Laufa
- World of Light
- Mandaean cosmology
- Image of God in Christianity
- Correspondence (theology)
- Theory of forms in Platonism
- Hyperuranion in Platonism
- Archetype
- Qareen in Islam
- Doppelgänger
- Etiäinen
- Shadow (psychology)
