= Abu al-Haris =

Mandaean religious feast

- Observed by: Mandaeans
- Type: Religious
- Significance: Feast (lofani) commemorating Noah's flood

In the Mandaean calendar, Abū al-Harīs (Arabic: أبو الهريس) or Ashoriya (Classical Mandaic: ࡀࡔࡅࡓࡉࡄ, romanized: Ašurih) is a Mandaean religious feast day celebrated on the 1st day of Sarṭana, which is the 6th month of the Mandaean calendar. Abu al-Haris is celebrated by Mandaeans as a day of remembrance commemorating the drowned people of Noah's flood. Grains and cereals are eaten as part of a special lofani (ritual meal), and another type of ritual meal called the dukrana is also prepared.

== Symbolism ==
Mandaeans believe that on this day, Noah and his son Sam made the food of forgiveness of sins for the souls of those who died in the flood. The food of forgiveness consists of seven grains representing the seven days of the week, and from the grounding of these seven grains came the name Abu Al-Harees. (See Ashure or Noah's pudding.)

== See also ==
- Genesis flood narrative
- Noah's Ark
