= Feast of the Great Shishlam =

Mandaean religious festival

Feast of the Great Shishlam Dehwa d-Shishlam Rabba
- Also called: Little New Year; Nauruz Zūṭa
- Observed by: Mandaeans
- Type: Religious, ethnic

The Feast of the Great Shishlam or Dehwa d-Šišlam Rabba (Classical Mandaic: ࡃࡉࡄࡁࡀ ࡖࡔࡉࡔࡋࡀࡌ ࡓࡁࡀ, romanized: Dihba ḏ-Šišlam Rba) or Nauruz Zūṭa (Classical Mandaic: ࡍࡀࡅࡓࡅࡆ ࡆࡅࡈࡀ, 'Little New Year') is a Mandaean religious holiday that takes place on the 6th and 7th days of Daula, the first month of the Mandaean calendar. It is named after Shishlam, the Mandaean personification of the prototypical priest.

The Night of Power takes place on the night of the 6th day (similar to Qadr Night), during which the heavenly gates of Abatur are open to the faithful. Priests visit Mandaean households and give them myrtle wreaths to hang on their houses for the rest of the year to protect against evil. The households also donate alms (zidqa) to the priests. Similarly, house blessings and door chalking also often take place on Epiphany, a Christian holiday typically celebrated on January 6.

== Prayers ==
In E. S. Drower's version of the Qulasta, prayer 177 is recited for the "Little New Year's Feast" or Dehwa d-Shishlam Rabba. In Drower's text, prayer 413 is a duplicate of prayer 177. It is also known as the "Vines Hymn", since the prayer begins with the opening line "Vines shone in the waters" (anhar gupnia b-gu mia).

== See also ==
- Epiphany in Christianity, typically celebrated on January 6
- Little Christmas, celebrated on January 6
- Dehwa Rabba, the Mandaean New Year
- Parwanaya
- Mandaean calendar
