= Kispu =

Ancient Mesopotamian ritual of veneration of the dead

Kispu or kispum was an ancient Mesopotamian ritual in which the ancestors were venerated, nourished and cared. The ritual included regular offering of food and drinks to the dead. Textual evidence for the kispu were found from as early as the 3rd millennium BC; these evidence indicate the ceremony included sacrifices and offerings. The textual evidence allow identification of archaeological findings, such as masses of dining vessels near secondary burial skeletons the royal hypogeum at Qatna, with the kispu.

== See also ==
- Lofani in Mandaeism
