= Ashure =

Traditional dessert in Armenia, Anatolia, and the Middle East

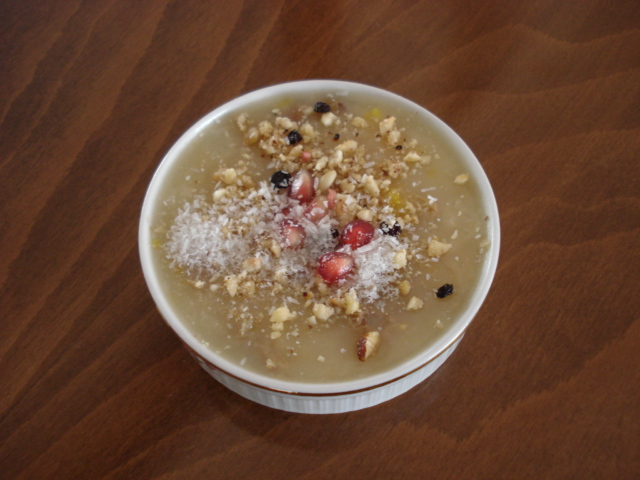
- Alternative names: Ashura, عاشورا, anoushabur (անուշապուր), aşure, Noah's pudding
- Type: Porridge
- Course: Dessert
- Region or state: Egypt, Turkey, Armenia, Middle East, Balkans
- Main ingredients: Grains, fruits and nuts

Ashure, Ashura, عاشورا, aşure, anoushabour, anoushabur, Noah's pudding or trigo koço is a sweet pudding that is made of a mixture consisting of various types of grains, fresh and dried fruits, and nuts.

In Egypt, the Balkans and Turkey, Muslims make the dish during the month of Muharram in which the Day of Ashura takes place. Armenians make it as a Christmas pudding and for New Year's celebrations, where it is a centerpiece, Sephardic Jews prepare the dish to celebrate the Jewish holiday of Tu BiShvat. In some Jewish, Christian, and Muslim traditions, a similar dish is prepared to commemorate a child's first tooth, or the passing of a family member.

Ashure was traditionally made and eaten during the colder months of the year due to its heavy and calorie rich nature, but now it is enjoyed year-round. The dish is traditionally made in large quantities and is distributed to friends, relatives, neighbors, colleagues, classmates, and others, without regard to the recipient's religion or belief system as an offering of peace and love.

== History and traditions ==
=== Earliest origins ===
For the people of the ancient Near East, foods composed of boiled whole grains came to be associated with spring and harvest rites since ancient times. This association spread to Asia, Europe, and Africa. Rites related with Tammuz, the Babylonian god of wheat and fertility, were recorded as late as the 10th century by an Arab traveler who wrote about boiled wheat among the dishes consumed at a pagan celebration held at Harran.

Jews, Christians and Muslims have all consumed boiled wheat in a variety of ways under various names for millennia. These dishes have been sweetened in various ways with sugar, fruit molasses, and dried fruits. Although they are connected to Abrahamic religious holidays like the tenth day of Muharram, Christmas, Lent, Easter, and Tu BiShvat, as well as occasions like a child's first tooth or a family member's passing, their roots can be traced back to fertility and rebirth rituals used by early farmers in the Near East.

Egypt

The tradition of preparing a wheat-based dish on a specific day of the year may have pre-Islamic origins in Egypt. Some historians suggest that ancient Egyptians celebrated a festival related to the sowing of wheat during the late Pyramid Age, which involved preparing dishes from wheat and milk. This ancient practice is believed to have influenced the later Egyptian observance of Ashura.

The observance of Ashura in Egypt was significantly shaped by the Fatimid Caliphate (909–1171 CE), which established mourning rituals for the martyrdom of Hussein bin Ali on the 10th of Muharram. Under the Fatimids, Ashura was a day of sorrow and mourning, with markets closed and people summoned to the palace for a grand mourning banquet known as "Simat al-Huzn" (the Table of Sorrow).

However, after the Ayyubid rise to power led by Saladin in the 12th century, the day was transformed into a festive occasion. Saladin reportedly ordered his cooks to create a special sweet dish made of wheat, sugar, milk, and nuts to replace the mourning foods associated with the Fatimid era, and it was named " Ashura - عاشورا", thereby establishing the Egyptian tradition of Ashura as a celebratory pudding.

=== Armenia ===
According to one tradition, it is claimed that when the ark came to rest on Mount Ararat, the family of Noah celebrated with a special dish. Since their supplies were nearly exhausted, what was left (primarily grains, dried fruits and the like) was cooked together to form a pudding and that "pudding" is now called anoushabour.

Armenians make anoushabur to commemorate this event, but also other events. After a baby is born, Armenian families observe a period of seclusion for up to 40 days, culminating in a baptism ceremony (knunk). In general, Armenians enjoy anoushabur as a part of festive spreads. Armenian sources note it was cleverly used to maintain the fast, yet celebrate Christmas eve with a sweet treat. It’s also used in thanksgiving offerings, during weddings or house blessings. Sharing Anoushabur is a gesture of communal warmth, linking family, faith, and gratitude. Anoushabur is distributed to the poor, as well as to neighbors, friends and relatives. Since Armenians serve this pudding during Christmas (6 January) and on New Year's Eve (Armenians of Jerusalem celebrate it at 13 January), it is sometimes called "Armenian Christmas Pudding".

This traditional Armenian sweet porridge is made from wheat or barley, dried fruits (such as apricots, raisins, and prunes), sugar, spices (like vanilla and cinnamon) and nuts (almonds and pistachios are most common). The grains are simmered until tender, then combined with the fruits and nuts, then sweetened, and flavored with rose water and the spices. Anoushabur may be garnished with pomegranate seeds, dried fruits and cinnamon. The pudding may be accompanied by multiple Armenian desserts and nuts, such as almonds or pistachios.

Anoushabur (անուշապուր) is a compound Armenian word. "Anoush" (անուշ) means sweet and "Abur" (ապուր) means soup or porridge, so the word Anoushabur literally means "Sweet soup" or "Sweet porridge".

=== Türkiye ===
According to one tradition, it is claimed that when the ark came to rest on Mount Cudi or Mount Ararat, the family of Nuh or Noah celebrated with a special dish. Since their supplies were nearly exhausted, what was left (primarily grains, dried fruits and the like) was cooked together to form a pudding, what is now called ashure.

Turkish families make ashure pudding to commemorate this event. Ashure is distributed to the poor, as well as to neighbors, friends and relatives. Evliya Çelebi says in his travelbook Seyahatnâme that "Ashure is a porridge (as) that should be cooked on the tenth of Muharram."

According to a late Ottoman writer, ashure was a dish prepared over a cauldron in memory of deceased family members before it was served to neighbors, suggesting that for certain Sunni families the meal had a connection to remembering the deceased.

Today, a dish akin to this is prepared to honor a child's first tooth. According to the Ottoman historian Ahmed Cavid (d. 1803), women gave it away to loved ones, friends, and the impoverished as a gesture of gratitude for the child's survival of the difficult first year of life. In Turkey and many other Middle Eastern countries, this tradition is still common among Christians, Jews, and Muslims. The dish can be either sweet or savory and is known in Turkey as diş buğday ('tooth wheat').

Aşure is also made during the Hıdırellez spring celebration, which is the occasion where it is most similar to its ancient pagan roots.

=== Jewish cuisine ===
Sephardic Jews prepare Ashure, also known as "trigo koço", for the Jewish holiday of Tu BiShvat. It is made out of boiling wheat grains combined with sugar, crushed walnuts, and cinnamon. According to Aylin Öney Tan, this practice may have originated from early Jewish communities in Anatolia during the Byzantine period rather than being brought to Ottoman Turkey by Sephardic Jews who settled there following their expulsion from Spain and Portugal in the late 15th century. Several Jewish communities prepare Ashura, also known as b'Lila, to celebrate a child's first tooth.

=== The Balkans ===
This dish is prepared in Bosnia and Bulgaria under the names hašure and ashoure, respectively. It is also popular in Albanian cuisine.

== Ingredients ==
Ashure porridge does not have a single recipe, as recipes vary between regions and families.

Traditionally, it is said to have at least seven ingredients. Some say at least ten ingredients must be used, in keeping with the theme of "tenth", while Alevis always use twelve. Among these are wheat, barley, rice, white beans, chickpeas, pekmez, date molasses, pomegranate molasses, beet juice, dried fruits like dates, raisins, currants, apricots, figs, apples and nuts like pistachios, almonds, hazelnuts, walnuts, pine nuts and sesame seeds. However, many renditions add orange, lemon and lime peel to add depth to the pudding. Anise seed, black cumin seeds, prunus mahaleb, pomegranate arils, cardamom, cinnamon, cloves, nutmeg, allspice and desiccated or shredded coconut may be used as garnish, and some variations are flavored with anise liqueur, rose water and/or orange blossom water.

== Etymology ==
The word Ashure comes from the Arabic word "Ashura" (Arabic: عَاشُوْرَاء ʿĀshūrāʾ ), meaning 'tenth'.

== See also ==
- Ashoriya, a Mandaean festival during which grains and cereals are eaten in remembrance for the drowned people of Noah's flood
