= Gadia (month) =

- Native name: ࡂࡀࡃࡉࡀ (Classical Mandaic)
- Calendar: Mandaean calendar
- Month number: 12
- Number of days: 30
- Season: paiz (autumn)
- Gregorian equivalent: June / July
- Significant days: Kanshi u-Zahli (Gadia 30)

Gadia (Classical Mandaic: ࡂࡀࡃࡉࡀ), alternatively known as Ṭabit (Classical Mandaic: ࡈࡀࡁࡉࡕ), is the twelfth month of the Mandaean calendar.

Light fasting is practiced by Mandaeans on the 28th and 29th days of Gadia. The 30th and last day of Gadia is Kanshi u-Zahli, or New Year's Eve. Mandaeans clean and wash the whole household, perform baptism, and buying new clothes in preparation for the New Year. At sunset, Mandaeans will close their doors and stay inside for 36 hours to commemorate the assembly of the angels in heaven.

It is the Mandaic name for the constellation Capricorn. It currently corresponds to June / July in the Gregorian calendar due to a lack of a leap year in the Mandaean calendar.
