= Ram and Rud =

Figures in Mandaeism

In Mandaeism, Ram and Rud (Modern Mandaic pronunciation: [rɑm u rud]) are a couple named as the progenitors of the second generation of humans. Ram is the husband, while Rud is his wife.

According to Book 18 of the Right Ginza, Ram and Rud lived in the second out of four epochs (or eras) of the world, which is given a duration of 480,000 years. The epoch of Ram and Rud lasted 156,000 years, or 25 generations according to Book 1 of the Right Ginza. This epoch is preceded by the epoch of Adam and Eve and followed by the epoch of Shurbai and Sharhabeil.

== See also ==
- Mandaean calendar § Epochs
