= Sin (Mandaeism) =

Moon in Mandaeism

Sen
- Member of the Classical Planets
- Other names: Sira, Saureil, Agzeil, Ṭaṭmeil
- Abode: World of Darkness
- Planet: Moon
- Parents: Ruha and Ur

Equivalents
- Akkadian: Sin

In Mandaeism, Sin or Sen (Classical Mandaic: ࡎࡉࡍ) is the name for a divine figure associated with the Moon (Mandaic sira, Imperial Aramaic: שהרא, romanized: śe/ahrā, lit. 'moon'.

Sen is one of the embodiments of the classical planets (Classical Mandaic: ࡔࡅࡁࡀ, romanized: šuba, lit. 'The Seven'), who are part of the entourage of Ruha in the World of Darkness.

In Mandaean astrology, Sin is associated with miscarriages and abnormal births. Other names for Sin include Agzʿil, Ṭaṭmʿil, Ṣaurʿil, and Sira. Sin's name is derived from the Akkadian language name Sīnu, a moon deity in ancient Mesopotamian religion.

Chapter 53 of the Mandaean Book of John (also in Right Ginza 15.4) is about Sin.
