= Shishlam =

Uthra (angelic being) in Mandaeism

- Prototypical Mandaean priest
- Other names: Shishlam Rabba (Šišlam Rba)
- Texts: The Coronation of the Great Shishlam; The Wedding of the Great Shishlam
- Ethnic group: Mandaeans
- Festivals: Feast of the Great Shishlam
- Consort: Ezlat

In Mandaeism, Shishlam (Classical Mandaic: ࡔࡉࡔࡋࡀࡌ, romanized: Šišlam, lit. 'consummate perfection'; Modern Mandaic pronunciation: [ʃiʃˈlam]) is a figure representing the prototypical Mandaean priest or Mandaean. He is also frequently referred to in Mandaean texts as Šišlam Rabba (Classical Mandaic: ࡔࡉࡔࡋࡀࡌ ࡓࡁࡀ, romanized: Šišlam Rba, lit. 'Great Shishlam'. Shishlam is sometimes identified with Adam Kasia, the "Perfect Man".

== In Mandaean scriptures ==
In Mandaean texts, Shishlam communicates with uthras from the World of Light and partakes in rituals to re-establish laufa (spiritual connection) with the World of Light. Hence, Shishlam is essentially a literary personification or representation of the Mandaean who is participating in the ritual that the text is being used for.

The Wedding of the Great Shishlam, a ritual text used during Mandaean wedding ceremonies, is named after Shishlam.

As the priestly prototype or archetype, Shishlam features prominently in several Mandaean priestly esoteric texts used during tarmida and ganzibra initiation ceremonies. These texts include:

- The Thousand and Twelve Questions, which mentions Shishlam as the son of Nbat, or alternatively as the son of Adam S'haq Rba (literally 'Adam was bright, the Great'). Ezlat "She Wove", described as the "Wellspring of Light," is mentioned as Shishlam's wife or female consort. In Book 2, Part 5.2 of The 1012 Questions, Shishlam is also mentioned as the son of Lihdaia Rba Zadiqa (the "Unique Great Holy One"; or "Unique Great Righteous One," see Right Ginza 9.2).
- The Coronation of the Great Shishlam
- The Scroll of Exalted Kingship
- Alma Rišaia Rba
- Alma Rišaia Zuṭa

== Feast ==
Shishlam's festival is the Feast of the Great Shishlam, celebrated annually by Mandaeans on the sixth and seventh days of the first month.

== See also ==
- Self in Jungian psychology, a Jungian archetype
- Adam Kasia
- Mandaean priest
- Yura (Mandaeism)
- Ezlat
