= Dehwa Rabba =

New Year's Day in the Mandaean calendar

- Also called: Nauruz Rabba
- Observed by: Mandaeans
- Type: Religious, ethnic
- Significance: First day of the Mandaean calendar

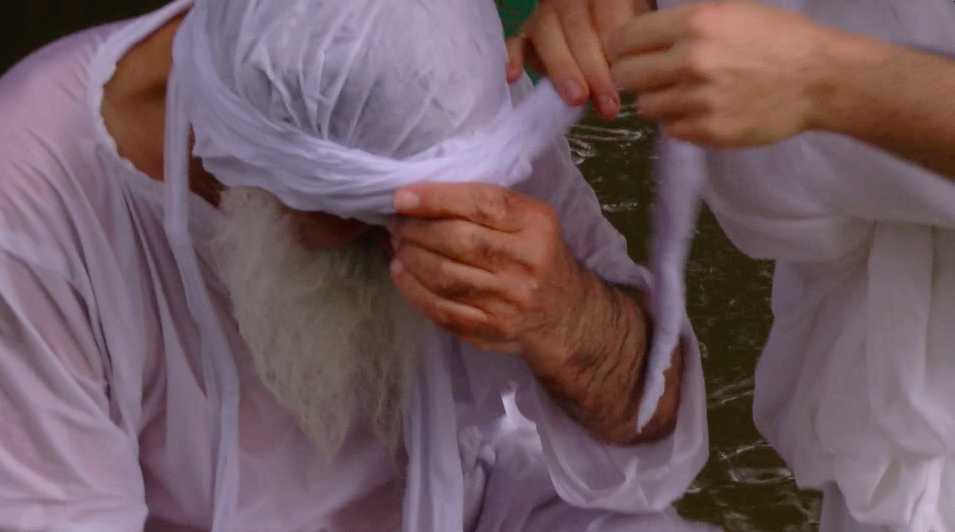
Kanshiy u-Zahly masbuta in Sydney, Australia (2016)

Dehwa Rabba (Classical Mandaic: ࡃࡉࡄࡁࡀ ࡓࡁࡀ, romanized: Dihba Rba, lit. 'Great Feast') or Nauruz Rabba (Classical Mandaic: ࡍࡀࡅࡓࡅࡆ ࡓࡁࡀ, 'Great New Year') is the Mandaean New Year. It is the first day of Daula (or Dowla), the first month of the Mandaean calendar.

== Kanshi u-Zahli ==
Kanshī u-Zahli or Kanshiy u-Zahly (Classical Mandaic: ࡊࡀࡍࡔࡉࡀ ࡅࡆࡀࡄࡋࡉࡀ, romanized: Kanšia u-Zahlia, lit. 'cleaning and purification') is the day preceding Dehwa Rabba, or New Year's Eve. It is the 30th day of Gadia, the twelfth month (i.e., the last day of the Mandaean year). On Kanshi u-Zahli, Mandaeans do not work as it is a holy day. Mandaean priests spend the entire day performing prayers and masbuta until the afternoon, and also animals are slaughtered for consumption. Ritual purity must be maintained during the entire period. Before the sun sets, Mandaeans prepare food for the following day of Dehwa Rabba and also perform ṭmasha, or ritual immersion in water that does not require the assistance of a priest.

== 36 hours of seclusion ==
At sunset, once the North Star appears in the sky, Mandaeans must stay inside their homes with their families for 36 hours. No one is permitted to go outside their homes during these 36 hours, since Mandaeans believe that the naṭria (guardian spirits, including the water guardians Shilmai and Nidbai) have left Tibil and returned to the World of Light, leaving people on Tibil vulnerable to misfortune. As a result, Mandaeans will emerge only at noontime on the 2nd day of Daula (the day following Dehwa Rabba).

Deaths during these 36 hours are considered to be inauspicious (mbaṭṭal, Classical Mandaic: ࡌࡁࡀࡈࡀࡋ, romanized: mbaṭal), and the masiqta of Adam needs to be performed when Mandaean deaths occur during this time. During this period of time, it is also inauspicious to kill any animals or even swat insects.

E. S. Drower has compared this period of isolation to the Babylonian festival Akitu and to the myth of Dumuzid's descent into the underworld and his subsequent ascent after three days.

== See also ==
- Mandaean calendar
- Feast of the Great Shishlam
- Parwanaya
- Rosh Hashanah
- Nowruz
- Islamic New Year
- Akitu
