= Shurbai and Sharhabeil =

Figures in Mandaeism

In Mandaeism, Shurbai and Sharhabeil (Šurbai and Šarhabʿil, Modern Mandaic pronunciation: [ʃurˈbai u ʃarhabiˈel]) are a couple named as the progenitors of the third generation of humans. Shurbai is the husband, while Sharhabeil is his wife.

According to Book 18 of the Right Ginza, Shurbai and Sharhabeil lived in the third out of four epochs (or eras) of the world, which is given a duration of 480,000 years. The epoch of Shurbai and Sharhabeil lasted 100,000 years, or 15 generations according to Book 1 of the Right Ginza. This epoch is preceded by the epoch of Ram and Rud and followed by the current and final epoch of Noah and his wife Nuraita (or Nhuraita), in which the fourth generation of humans (beginning with Noah) currently live.

Šarhabeil is also described as the "Great First Radiance" in Qulasta prayers 25 and 381.

== See also ==
- Mandaean calendar § Epochs
