= Dehwa Daimana =

Birthday of John the Baptist in the Mandaean calendar

- Also called: Dihba ḏ-Yamana, Dihba Daimana, Dihba Rba ḏ-Daima
- Observed by: Mandaeans
- Type: Religious
- Significance: Birthday of John the Baptist

In the Mandaean calendar, Dehwa Daimana (written Mandaic transliteration: Dihba ḏ-Yamana (ࡃࡉࡄࡁࡀ ࡖࡉࡀࡌࡀࡍࡀ), Dihba Daimana, or Dihba Rba ḏ-Daima) is a festival celebrating the birthday of John the Baptist, whom Mandaeans revere as the greatest and final prophet.

Children are baptized for the first time during this festival. It is held on the first day of Hiṭia, the 11th month of the Mandaean calendar, corresponding to the Hebrew month of Kislev in the Hebrew calendar and May-June in the Gregorian calendar.

== See also ==
- Nativity of Saint John the Baptist
