= Masiqta =

Mass or ritual practiced in the Mandaean religion

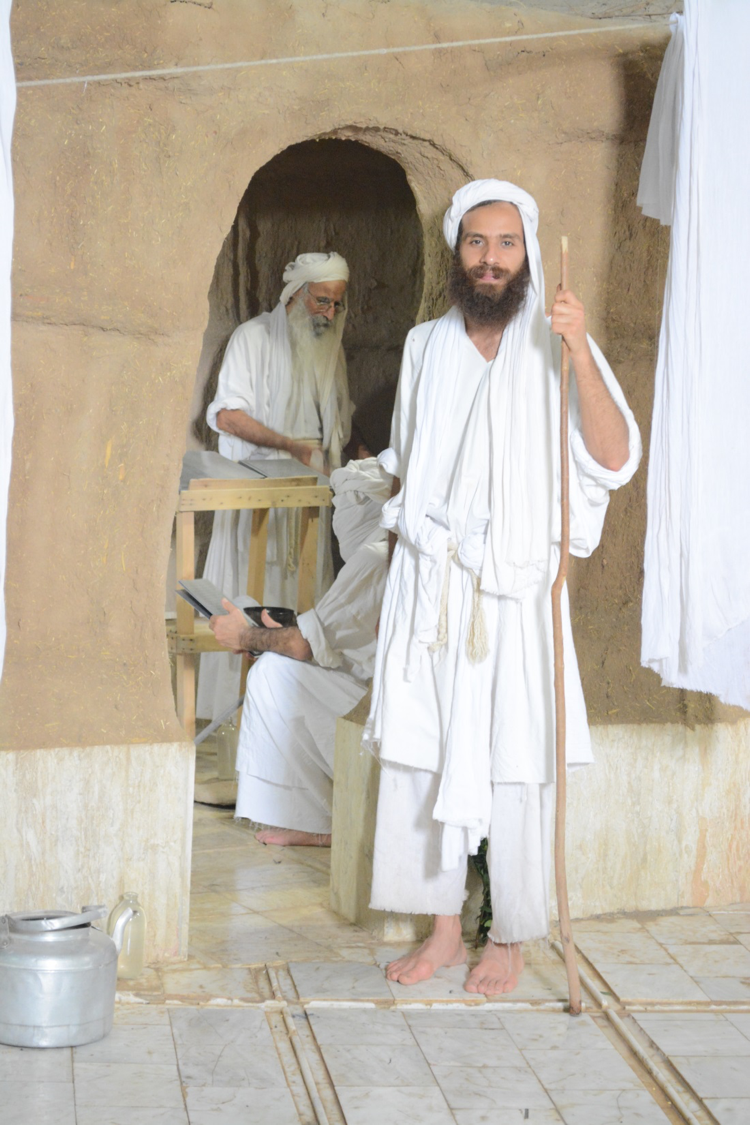
Three Mandaean priests (one ganzibra and two tarmidia) performing a masiqta during the 2015 Parwanaya in Ahvaz, Iran

The masiqta (Classical Mandaic: ࡌࡀࡎࡉࡒࡕࡀ, lit. 'ascent') is a mass or ritual practiced in the Mandaean religion in order to help guide the soul (nišimta) towards the World of Light in Mandaean cosmology. They are typically performed as funerary rites for Mandaeans who have just died. Although usually translated as "death mass", a few types of masiqta are also performed for living people, such as when priests are ordained. Masiqtas are also used to consecrate houses of worship (bit manda).

== Purpose ==
The complex ritual involves guiding the soul through the maṭarta, or toll houses located between the Earth (Tibil) and the World of Light, which are guarded by various uthras and demons.

A successful masiqta merges the incarnate soul (ࡍࡉࡔࡉࡌࡕࡀ nišimta; roughly equivalent to the psyche or "ego" in Greek philosophy) and spirit (ࡓࡅࡄࡀ ruha; roughly equivalent to the pneuma or "breath" in Greek philosophy) from the Earth (Tibil) into a new merged entity in the World of Light called the ʿuṣṭuna. The ʿuṣṭuna can then reunite with its heavenly, non-incarnate counterpart (or spiritual image), the dmuta, in the World of Light, where it will reside in the world of ideal counterparts (Mšunia Kušṭa).

== Types ==
There are several different types of masiqtas depending on the cause or timing of the death. Adam and Shitil (Seth) both have masiqtas named after them.

The masiqta of Shitil (described in The Thousand and Twelve Questions) is performed for certain unclean deaths, such as:

- priests who die without their myrtle wreaths (klila) or otherwise improperly clad
- women who die on or after the 7th day after childbirth
- people dying during the 36 hours of seclusion on New Year's Eve (Kanshi u-Zahli)

The masiqta of Adam is performed for people who have died on one of the mbaṭṭal days, such as on Dehwa Rabba (New Year's Day). The masiqta of Adam and the masiqta of Shitil are both performed together for people dying in one place but are being buried in another.

The Ṭabahata Masiqta, or the "masiqta of the Parents", is held only once a year during the Parwanaya intercalary festival. Priests recite dozens of prayers, prepare 72 faṭiras (small, round, saltless, half-baked biscuits for ritual use) symbolizing ancestors, and also sacrifice a white dove, called Ba, which symbolizes the spirit. The Šarḥ ḏ-Ṭabahata ("The Scroll of Ṭabahata," or "The Scroll of the Ancestors") describes aspects of this masiqta. According to The Thousand and Twelve Questions, this masiqta cannot be held at any other time other than during the Parwanaya. It is celebrated in the names of a man and a woman, and is linked with the celebration of Dukrana lhdaia rba zadiqa.

Other masiqtas are listed below.

- The Bukra (lit. 'Firstborn') is the first masiqta performed by a priest after ordination (i.e., newly consecrated ganzibra). It is also known as the masiqta of the shwalia (šualia, or "priestly novice"). Drower (1937) gives the prayer recitation sequence for this masiqta as: 19, 75–77, 35, 9, 36–74, 91–99, 70, 100, 71–72, 171, 101, 58, 35, 9, 3, 102–103, 71–72, 171, 59, 72, 171.
- The masiqta of Zihrun Raza Kasia is performed for people who have died during one of the minor mbaṭṭal days (inauspicious days during which all rituals are forbidden), etc. The Šarḥ ḏ-Zihrun Raza Kasia ("The [Masiqta] of Zihrun, the Hidden Mystery") is a Mandaean religious text that describes the ritual and prayer sequence for this masiqta, as well as for the Masbuta of Zihrun Raza Kasia. This masiqta is also described in The Thousand and Twelve Questions, which also describes the "masiqta of the dukrania."
- The masiqta of Samandriʿil: is performed for people who have died from burns, trees falls, or drowning. (Samandriʿil is the name of an uthra.)
- The masiqta of Kanat is performed for women who died during pregnancy. (Kanat, also known as Kanat Niṭufta in the Asut Malkia, is the name of an uthra.)
- The masiqta of Hai-Šūm is performed for people who have died from snakebites. (Hai-Šūm is the name of an uthra.)

E. S. Drower (1937) also mentions the following types of masiqtas.

- The masiqta of the mandi
- The masiqta of the new ganzibra (also known as the masiqta of the ʿngirta). Drower (1937) gives the prayer recitation sequence for this masiqta as: 46, 48, 73–74, 35, 9, 75–77.

There are also other masiqtas for bridegrooms who have died during wedding ceremonies, and for moving the remains of a dead person.

== Ritual objects ==
Ritual objects used in masiqtas include teriani (plates made from mud and reed).

== See also ==
- Masbuta
- Requiem
- Prayer for the dead
- Valentinianism § Death
- Bariah
- Qeej, used to guide departed souls in Hmong rituals
- Balafon, used to guide departed souls in African rituals
