= Arqba =

- Native name: ࡀࡓࡒࡁࡀ (Classical Mandaic)
- Calendar: Mandaean calendar
- Month number: 10
- Number of days: 30
- Season: paiz (autumn)
- Gregorian equivalent: April / May

Arqba (Classical Mandaic: ࡀࡓࡒࡁࡀ), alternatively known as Mašrwan (Classical Mandaic: ࡌࡀࡔࡓࡅࡀࡍ, romanized: Mašruan), is the tenth month of the Mandaean calendar.

It is the Mandaic name for the constellation Scorpio. It currently corresponds to April / May in the Gregorian calendar due to a lack of a leap year in the Mandaean calendar.
