= Shumbulta =

- Native name: ࡔࡅࡌࡁࡅࡋࡕࡀ (Classical Mandaic)
- Calendar: Mandaean calendar
- Month number: 8
- Number of days: 30
- Season: giṭa (summer)
- Gregorian equivalent: February / March

Shumbulta or Šumbulta (Classical Mandaic: ࡔࡅࡌࡁࡅࡋࡕࡀ), alternatively known as Aylul (Classical Mandaic: ࡀࡉࡋࡅࡋ, romanized: Ailul), is the eighth month of the Mandaean calendar. Light fasting is practiced by Mandaeans from the 26th to 30th days of Shumbulta. The Parwanaya, or five intercalary days, take place immediately after Shumbulta.

Šumbulta, which literally means 'grain-ear', is the Mandaic name for the constellation Virgo. It currently corresponds to February / March in the Gregorian calendar due to a lack of a leap year in the Mandaean calendar.
