= Dukrana =

Mandaean ritual meal commemorating the dead

In Mandaeism, the dukrana (Classical Mandaic: ࡃࡅࡊࡓࡀࡍࡀ, lit. 'remembrance; memorial') or dukrania (plural form) is a type of memorial ritual meal commemorating the dead.

It is distinct from the zidqa brikha and lofani, which are two other types of ritual meal offered for the dead.

== See also ==
- Sacred food as offering
- Eucharist
- Koliva
- Lofani
- Laufa
- Zidqa brikha
- East Syriac Rite § Creed (Dukhrana is a Syriac word referring to the Prayer of Memorial of the Living and the Dead.)
