= Hitia =

- Native name: ࡄࡉࡈࡉࡀ (Classical Mandaic)
- Calendar: Mandaean calendar
- Month number: 11
- Number of days: 30
- Season: paiz (autumn)
- Gregorian equivalent: May / June
- Significant days: Dehwa Daimana (Hiṭia 1)

Hiṭia (Classical Mandaic: ࡄࡉࡈࡉࡀ), also called Kanun (Classical Mandaic: ࡊࡀࡍࡅࡍ), is the eleventh month of the Mandaean calendar. The first day of the month is Dehwa Daimana, which celebrates the birthday of John the Baptist.

It is the Mandaic name for the constellation Sagittarius. It currently corresponds to May / June in the Gregorian calendar due to a lack of a leap year in the Mandaean calendar.
