= Taura (month) =

- Native name: ࡕࡀࡅࡓࡀ (Classical Mandaic)
- Calendar: Mandaean calendar
- Month number: 4
- Number of days: 30
- Season: abhar (spring)
- Gregorian equivalent: October / November
- Significant days: Ead Fel (Taura 2-4); Dehwa Hanina (Taura 18)

Taura (Classical Mandaic: ࡕࡀࡅࡓࡀ), alternatively known as Ayar (Classical Mandaic: ࡀࡉࡀࡓ, romanized: Aiar), is the fourth month of the Mandaean calendar.

The month begins with the festival of Ead Fel, during which crushed dates with roasted sesame seeds are eaten. It is followed by 3 days of light fasting on the 2nd, 3rd, and 4th days of Taura. Dehwa Hanina, the Little Feast, is celebrated on the 18th day of Taura.

It is the Mandaic name for the constellation Taurus. It currently corresponds to October / November in the Gregorian calendar due to a lack of a leap year in the Mandaean calendar.
