= Aria (month) =

- Native name: ࡀࡓࡉࡀ (Classical Mandaic)
- Calendar: Mandaean calendar
- Month number: 7
- Number of days: 30
- Season: giṭa (summer)
- Gregorian equivalent: January / February

Aria (Classical Mandaic: ࡀࡓࡉࡀ), alternatively known as Ab (Classical Mandaic: ࡀࡁ), is the seventh month of the Mandaean calendar.

It is the Mandaic name for the constellation Leo. It currently corresponds to January / February in the Gregorian calendar due to a lack of a leap year in the Mandaean calendar.
