= Saureil =

Angel of death in Mandaeism

Ṣaureil
- Death
- Other names: Ṣaurʿil, Angel of Death, Ṣaureil Qmamir Ziwa
- Abode: World of Light

In Mandaeism, Ṣaureil, also spelled Ṣauriel or Ṣaurʿil (Classical Mandaic: ࡑࡀࡅࡓࡏࡉࡋ, Modern Mandaic pronunciation: [sˤauriˈel]), is the angel of death. Ṣaureil features prominently in Book 1 of the Left Ginza as the angel who announces the message of death to Adam and Shitil (Seth).

Ṣaureil is also an epithet for the Moon (Sen).

== In the Ginza Rabba ==
He is also known as Ṣaureil Qmamir Ziwa (Classical Mandaic: ࡑࡀࡅࡓࡏࡉࡋ ࡒࡌࡀࡌࡉࡓ ࡆࡉࡅࡀ; or Qamamir-Ziwa) in Book 1 of the Left Ginza. According to the Left Ginza, he is called "Death" in the world, but as Kushta ("Truth") to those who know of Ṣaureil's true heavenly nature.

== See also ==
- Abaddon, also called Apollyon, a destroying angel in the Book of Revelation
- Azrael, also known as Malak al-Maut, in Islam
- Destroying angel (Bible), or angel of death
- Gabriel, angel of death over kings
- List of angels in theology
- Michael (archangel), good angel of death
- Mot (god), an angel of death from the Hebraic Book of Habakkuk
- Nasirdin and Sejadin, angels of death in Yazidism
- Psychopomp, a creature, spirit, angel, or deity in many religions, responsible for escorting souls to the afterlife
- Samael, an important archangel in Talmudic and post-Talmudic lore
- Santa Muerte, a sacred figure venerated primarily in Mexico
- Shinigami, god or spirit of death in Japanese mythology
- Yama, lord of death, in early Rigvedic Hinduism
