= Silmia =

- Native name: ࡑࡉࡋࡌࡉࡀ (Classical Mandaic)
- Calendar: Mandaean calendar
- Month number: 5
- Number of days: 30
- Season: abhar (spring)
- Gregorian equivalent: November / December

Ṣilmia (Classical Mandaic: ࡑࡉࡋࡌࡉࡀ), alternatively known as Siwan (Classical Mandaic: ࡎࡉࡅࡀࡍ), is the fifth month of the Mandaean calendar.

Silmia, which literally means 'sculptures', is the Mandaic name for the constellation Gemini. It currently corresponds to November / December in the Gregorian calendar due to a lack of a leap year in the Mandaean calendar.
