= Qaina =

- Native name: ࡒࡀࡉࡍࡀ (Classical Mandaic)
- Calendar: Mandaean calendar
- Month number: 9
- Number of days: 30
- Season: giṭa (summer)
- Gregorian equivalent: March / April

Qaina (Classical Mandaic: ࡒࡀࡉࡍࡀ), alternatively known as Tišrin (Classical Mandaic: ࡕࡉࡔࡓࡉࡍ), is the ninth month of the Mandaean calendar. Mandaeans practice light fasting on the first day of Qaina.

Qaina, which literally means 'reed', is the Mandaic name for the constellation Libra. It currently corresponds to March / April in the Gregorian calendar due to a lack of a leap year in the Mandaean calendar.
