= Embra (month) =

- Native name: ࡏࡌࡁࡓࡀ (Classical Mandaic)
- Calendar: Mandaean calendar
- Month number: 3
- Number of days: 30
- Season: sitwa (winter)
- Gregorian equivalent: September / October

Embra, Īmbra, or ʿmbra (Classical Mandaic: ࡏࡌࡁࡓࡀ), alternatively known as Nisan (Classical Mandaic: ࡍࡉࡎࡀࡍ), is the third month of the Mandaean calendar.

It is the Mandaic name for the constellation Aries. It currently corresponds to September / October in the Gregorian calendar due to a lack of a leap year in the Mandaean calendar.
