= Daula (month) =

- Native name: ࡃࡀࡅࡋࡀ (Classical Mandaic)
- Calendar: Mandaean calendar
- Month number: 1
- Number of days: 30
- Season: sitwa (winter)
- Gregorian equivalent: July / August
- Significant days: Dehwa Rabba (Daula 1); Feast of the Great Shishlam (Daula 6)

Daula (Classical Mandaic: ࡃࡀࡅࡋࡀ), alternatively known as Šabaṭ (Classical Mandaic: ࡔࡀࡁࡀࡈ), is the first month of the Mandaean calendar. The month begins with Dehwa Rabba, or New Year's Day. The Feast of the Great Shishlam is celebrated on the sixth day of the month.

It is the Mandaic name for the constellation Aquarius. It currently corresponds to July / August in the Gregorian calendar due to a lack of a leap year in the Mandaean calendar.
