= Nuna (month) =

- Native name: ࡍࡅࡍࡀ (Classical Mandaic)
- Calendar: Mandaean calendar
- Month number: 2
- Number of days: 30
- Season: sitwa (winter)
- Gregorian equivalent: August / September

Nuna (Classical Mandaic: ࡍࡅࡍࡀ), alternatively known as Adar (Classical Mandaic: ࡀࡃࡀࡓ), is the second month of the Mandaean calendar. Light fasting is practiced by Mandaeans on the 25th day of Nuna.

It is the Mandaic name for the constellation Pisces. It currently corresponds to August / September in the Gregorian calendar due to a lack of a leap year in the Mandaean calendar.
