= Lofani =

Mandaean ritual meal commemorating the dead

In Mandaeism, the lofani, laufani, or laufania (Classical Mandaic: ࡋࡀࡅࡐࡀࡍࡉࡀ) is a type of ritual meal commemorating the dead. It is etymologically related to the word laufa ("spiritual communion"), since lofani meals symbolize the connection of the souls of the living and the dead. The meal sometimes contains sacrificed sheep or dove meat.

The lofani is a minor ritual meal which does not require the presence of a priest. It is distinct from the zidqa brikha and dukrana, which are two other types of ritual meal offered for the dead.

During Abu al-Haris, a day of remembrance commemorating the drowned people of Noah's flood (on the first day of the 6th Mandaean month Sarṭana), grains and cereals are eaten as part of a special lofani.

== Gallery ==
Lofani being prepared by Mandaean laypeople in Ahvaz, Iran:

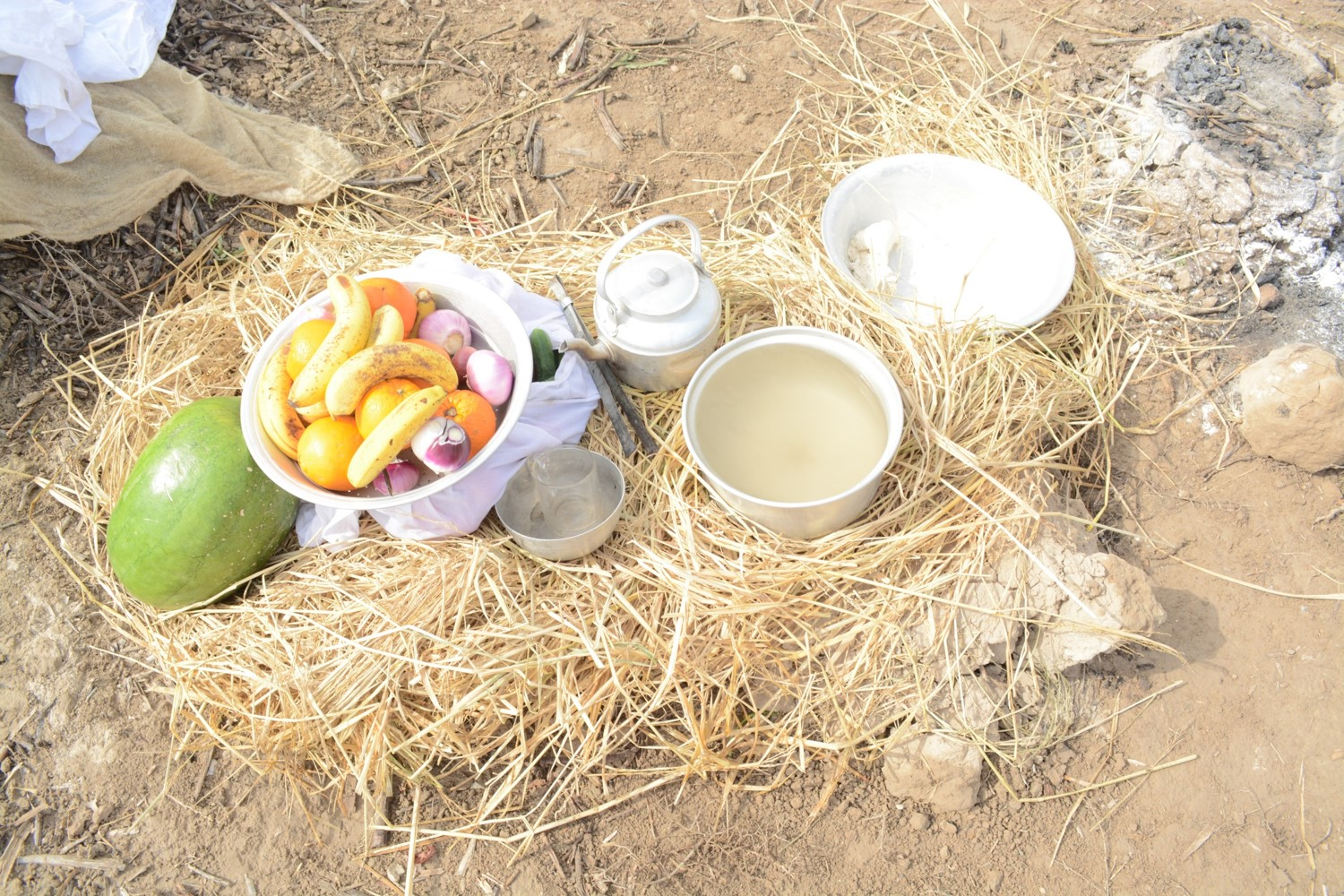

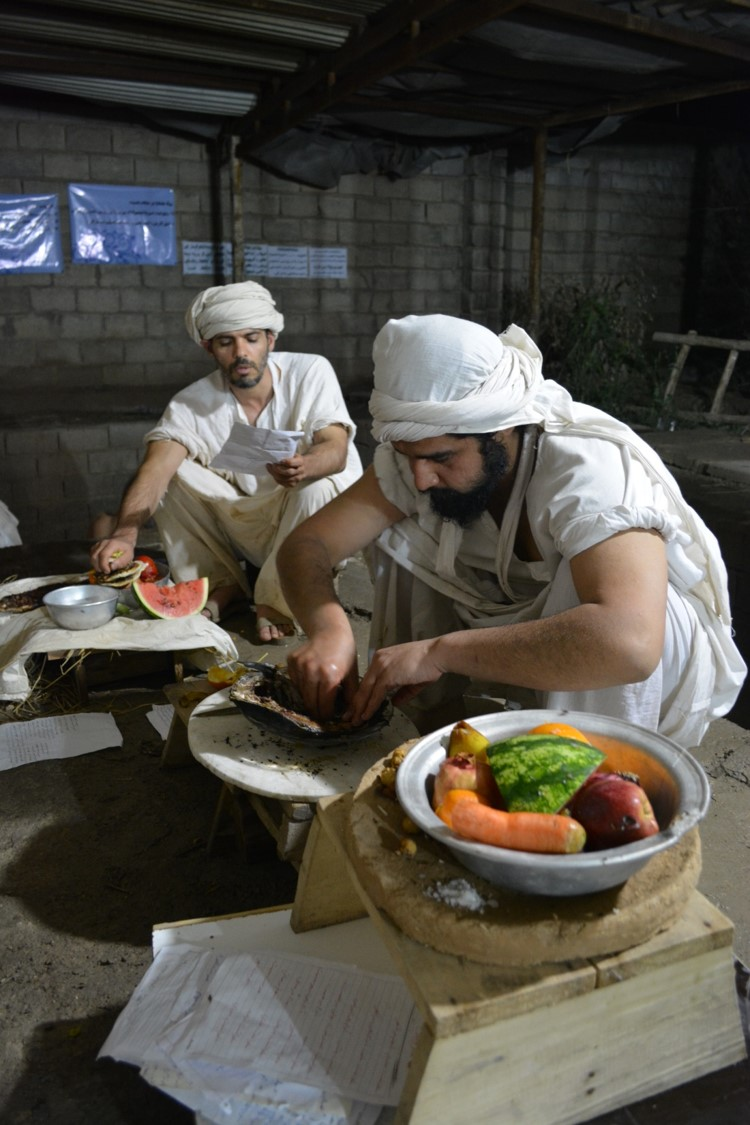

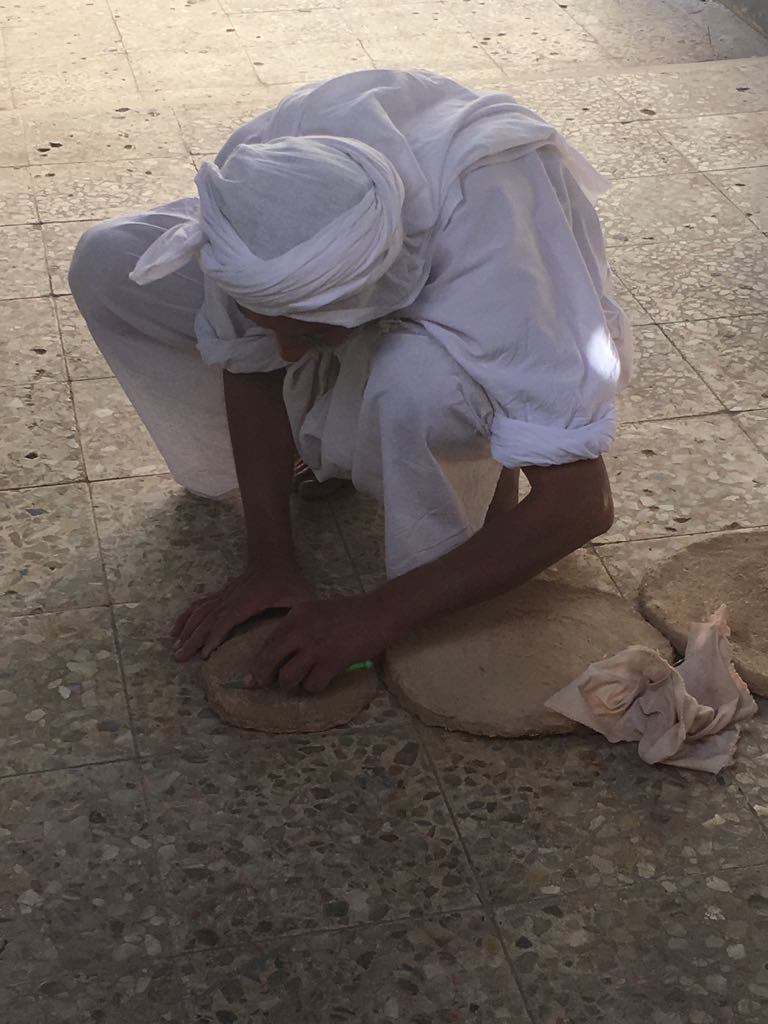

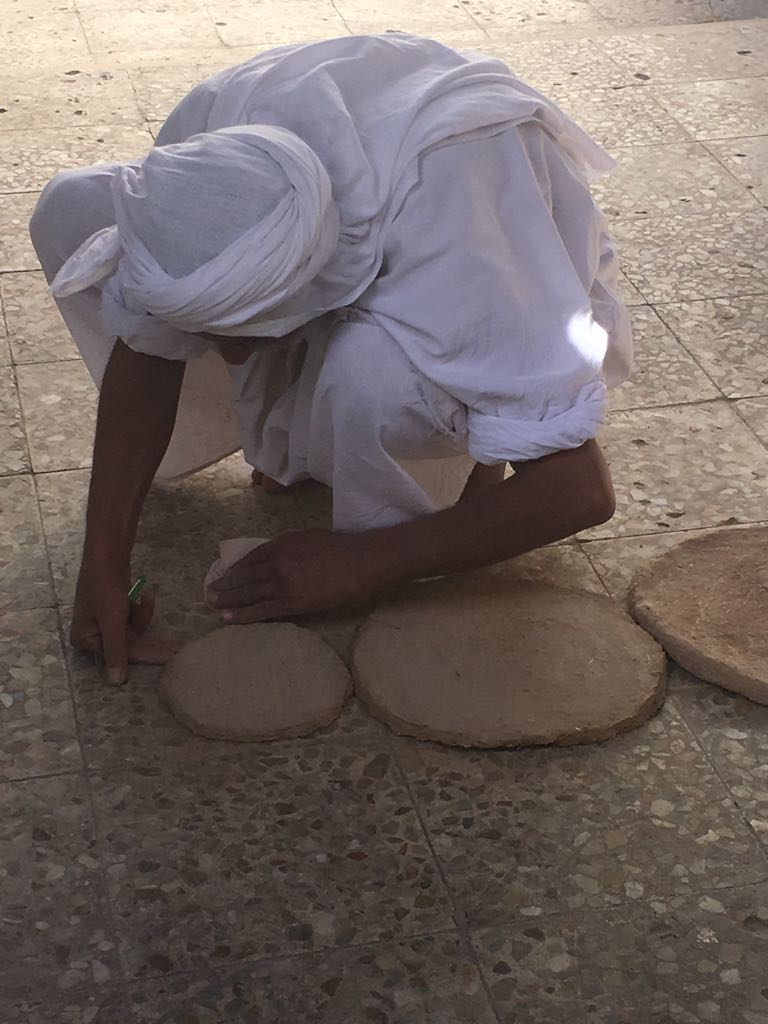

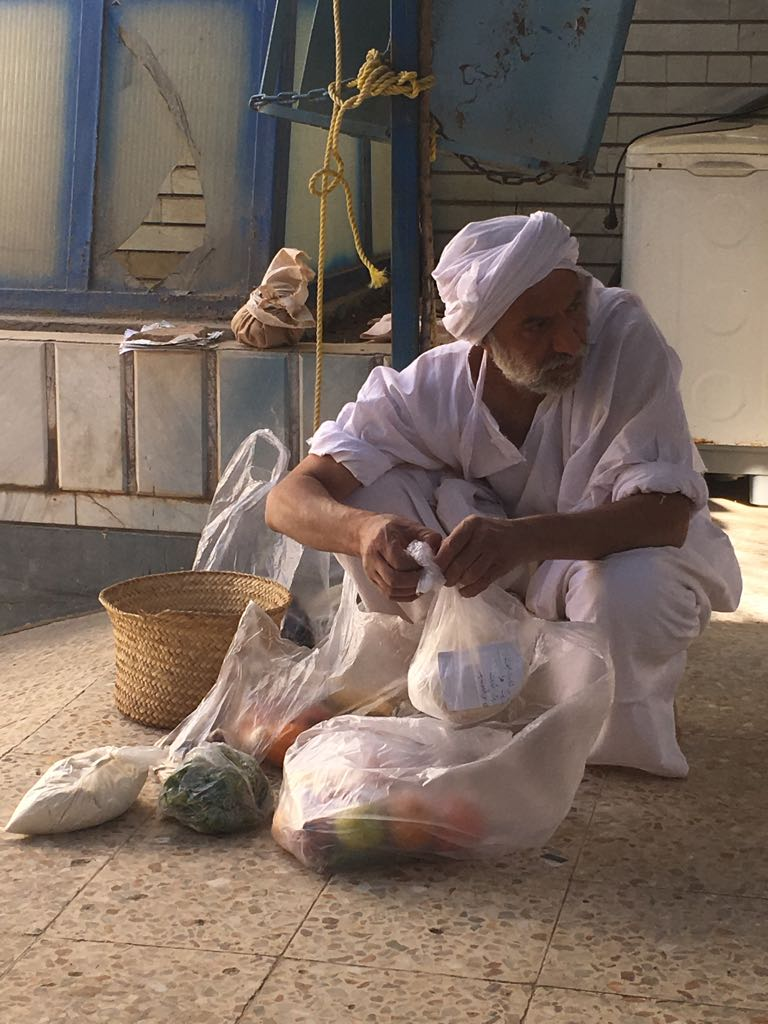

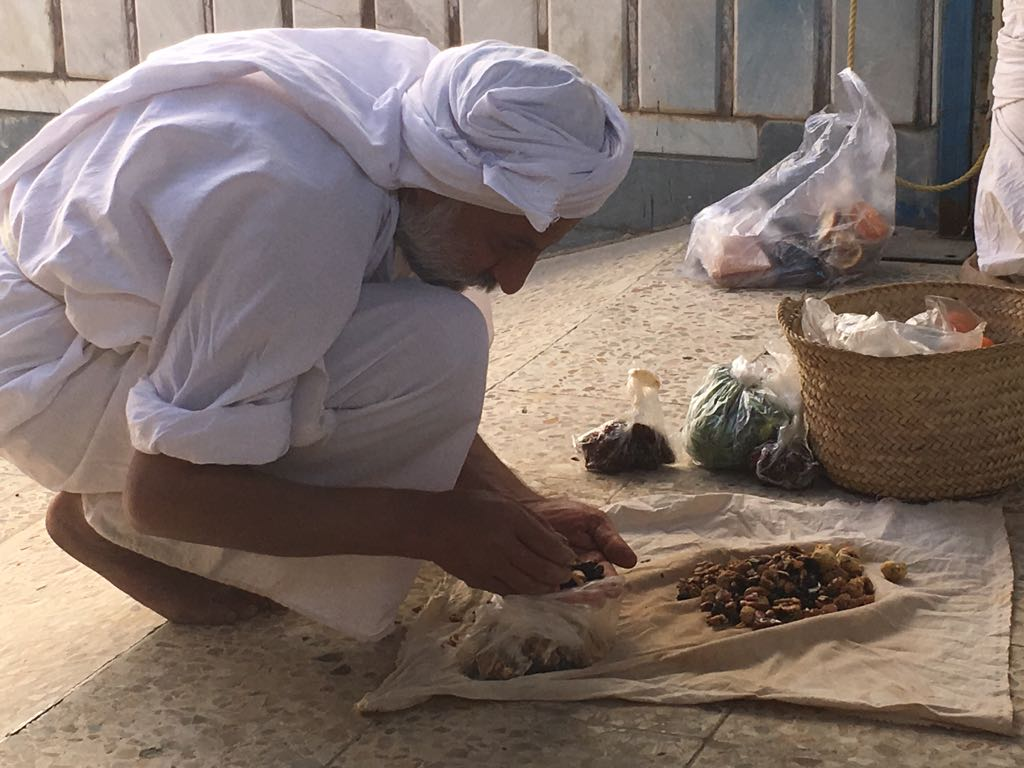

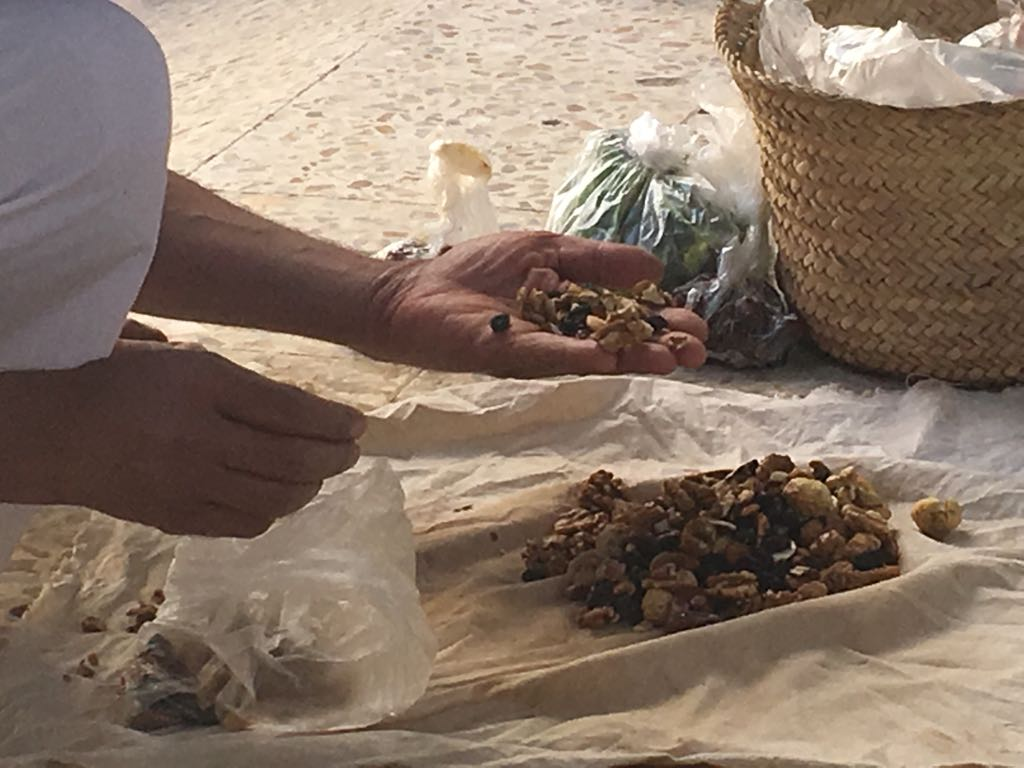

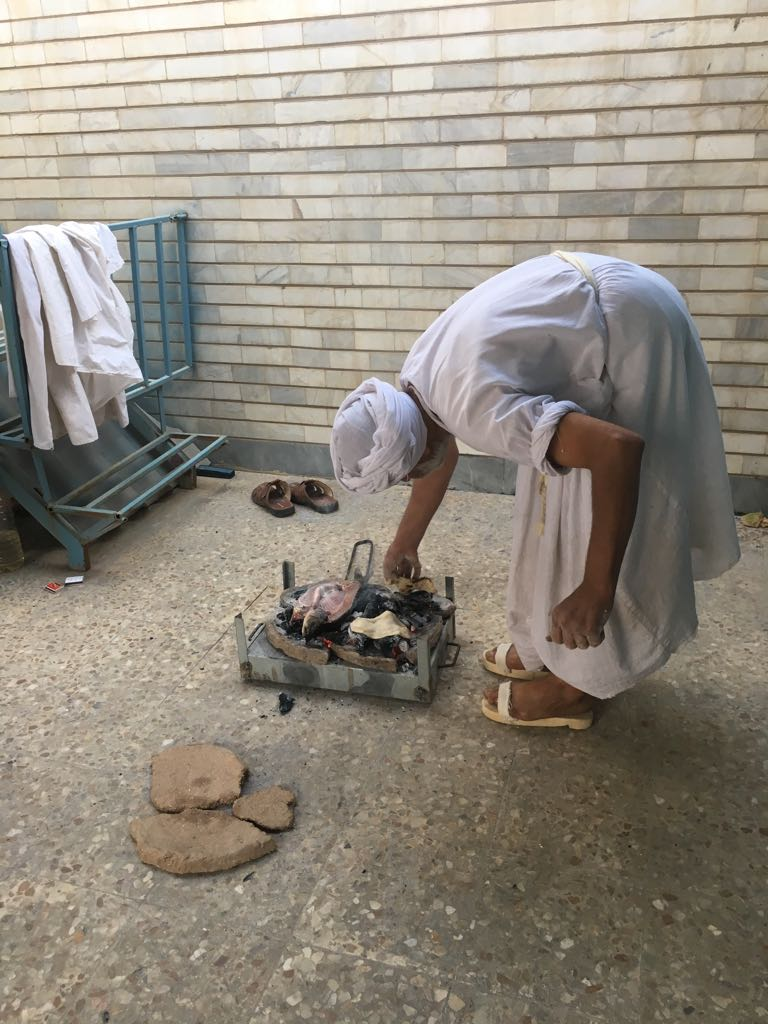

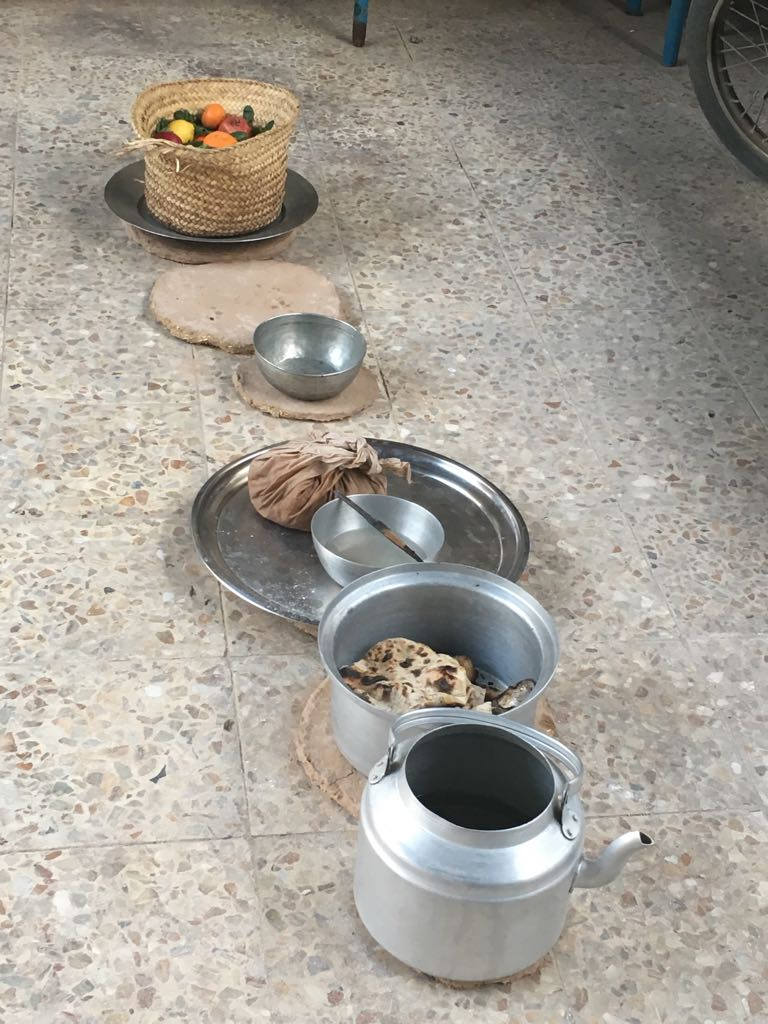

== See also ==
- Sacred food as offering
- Dukrana
- Eucharist
- Holy Qurbana in Syriac Christianity
- Kispu in Ancient Mesopotamia
- Koliva
- Laufa
- Prasada in Hinduism
- Zidqa brika
