= Bil (Mandaeism) =

Planet Jupiter in Mandaeism

Bil Bel
- Member of the Seven Planets
- Other names: Angeil
- Abode: World of Darkness
- Planet: Jupiter
- Parents: Ruha and Ur

Equivalents
- Akkadian: Bel

In Mandaeism, Bil (Classical Mandaic: ࡁࡉࡋ) or Bel is the Mandaic name for the planet Jupiter. Bil is one of the seven planets (Classical Mandaic: ࡔࡅࡁࡀ, romanized: šuba, lit. 'The Seven'), who are part of the entourage of Ruha in the World of Darkness.

Bil, who is also called Angʿil (or Angeil), is associated with masculinity, hotness, and moistness (see also four temperaments). Bil's name could be derived from the Akkadian Bēlu.
