= Parwanaya =

Five-day Mandaean religious festival

Parwanaya Paruanaiia
- Observed by: Mandaeans
- Type: Religious, ethnic

Parwanaya (Classical Mandaic: ࡐࡀࡓࡅࡀࡍࡀࡉࡉࡀ, romanized: Paruanaiia; Arabic: البرونايا) or Panja (Mandaic: ࡐࡀࡍࡔࡀ Panša, from Persian 'five') is a five-day religious festival in the Mandaean calendar. The 5 epagomenals (extra days) inserted at the end of every Šumbulta (the 8th month) constitute the Parwanaya intercalary feast. The festival celebrates the five days that Hayyi Rabbi created the uthri and the universe.

== Origins ==
The epagomenals in the Egyptian calendar were also considered to be sacred days in Ancient Egypt, as they were considered to be the birthdays of different gods. Today in the Coptic calendar, these five days are designated by the Coptic Orthodox Church as feast days for different saints.

== Rites ==
The maṣbuta (baptism), Ṭabahata Masiqta (ascension of the soul ceremony for ancestors), and hawad mania rites are held during the Parwanaya.

== Texts ==
Mandaean texts containing instructions for rites performed during the Parwanaya include the Šarḥ ḏ-Parwanaiia ("Scroll of the Parwanaya") and Šarḥ ḏ-Ṭabahata ("Scroll of the Ancestors").

== Gallery ==
Gallery of Mandaeans celebrating Parwanaya on the banks of the Tigris River in Amarah, Maysan Governorate, Iraq on 17 March 2019:

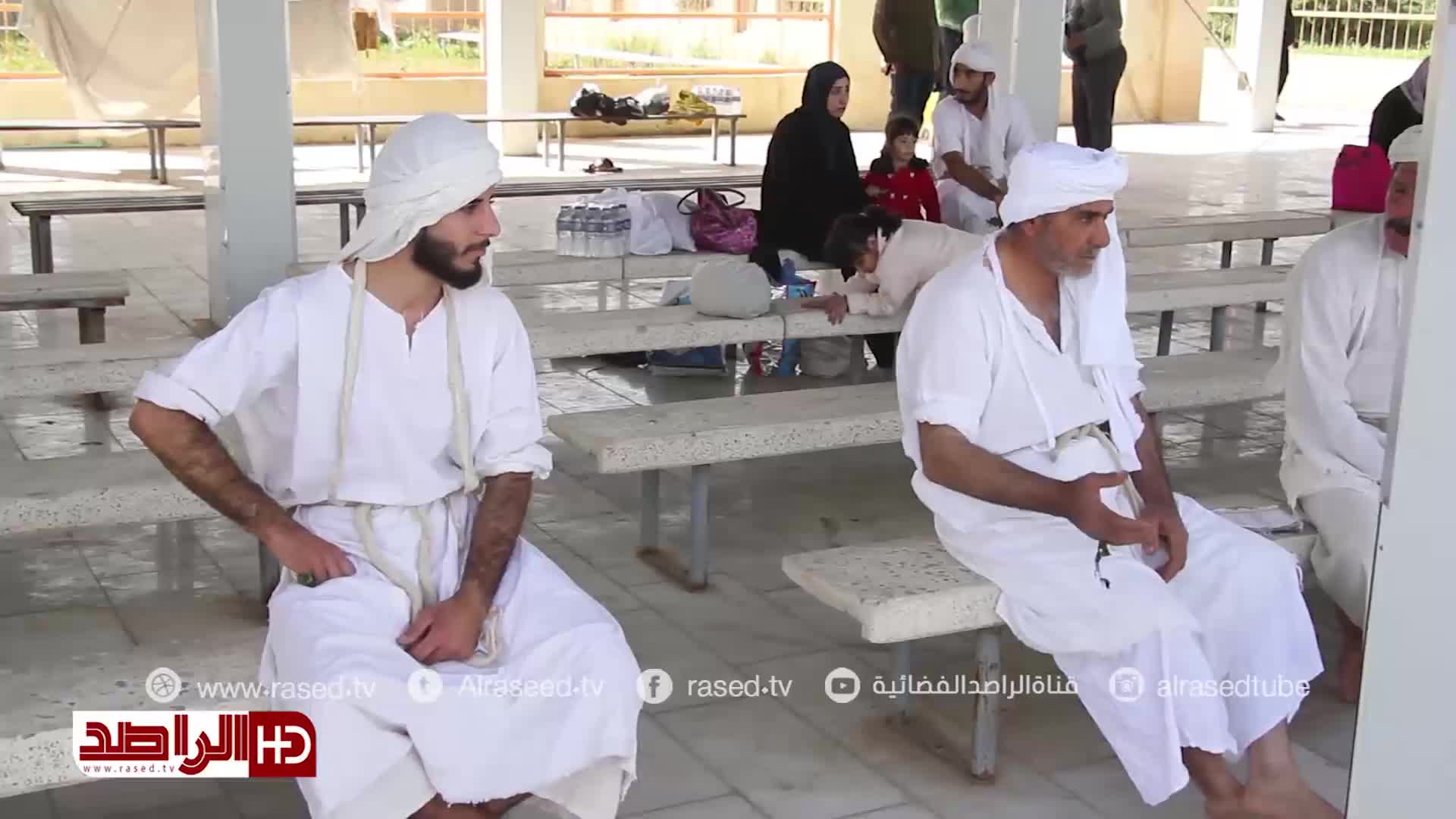

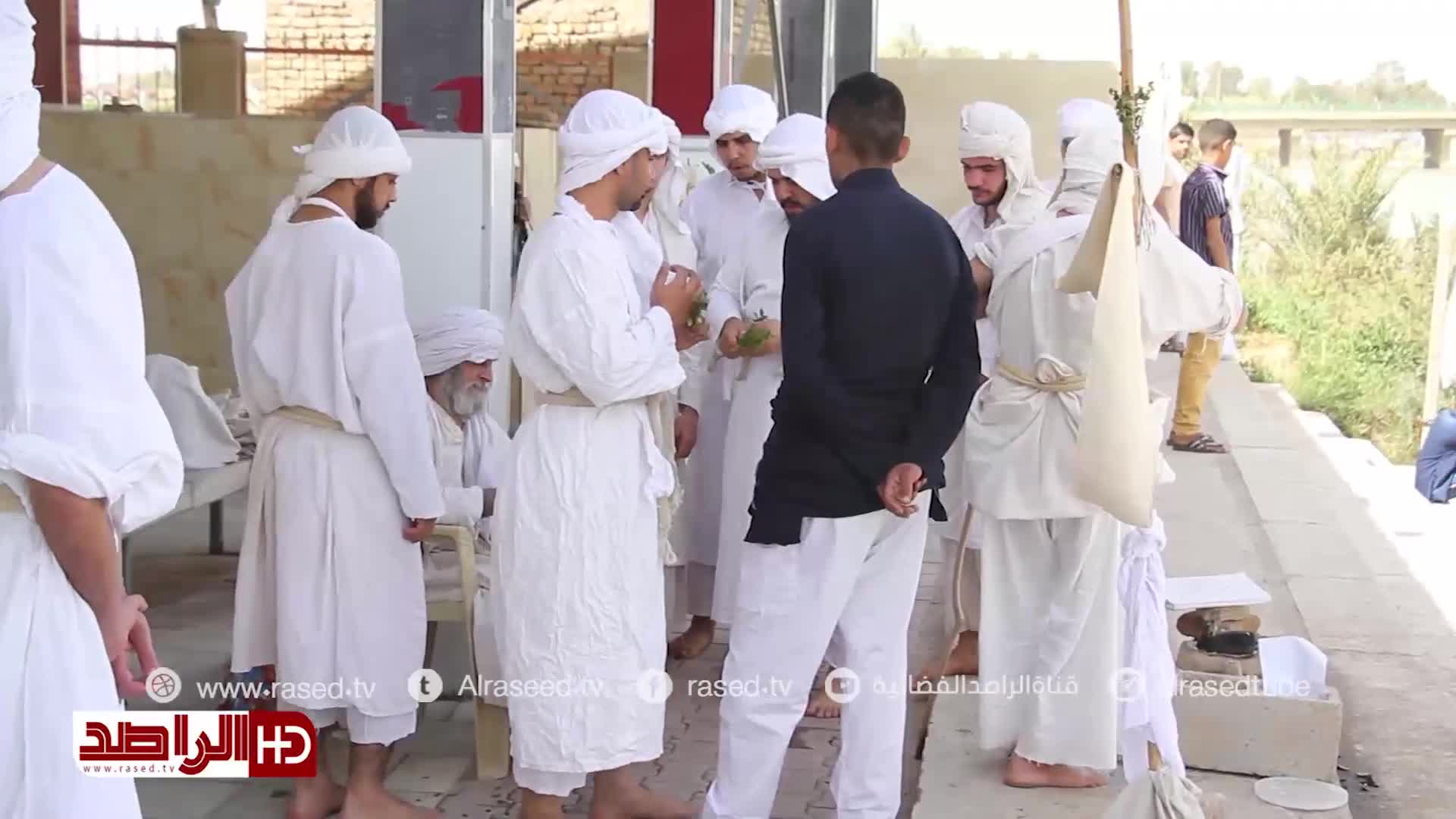

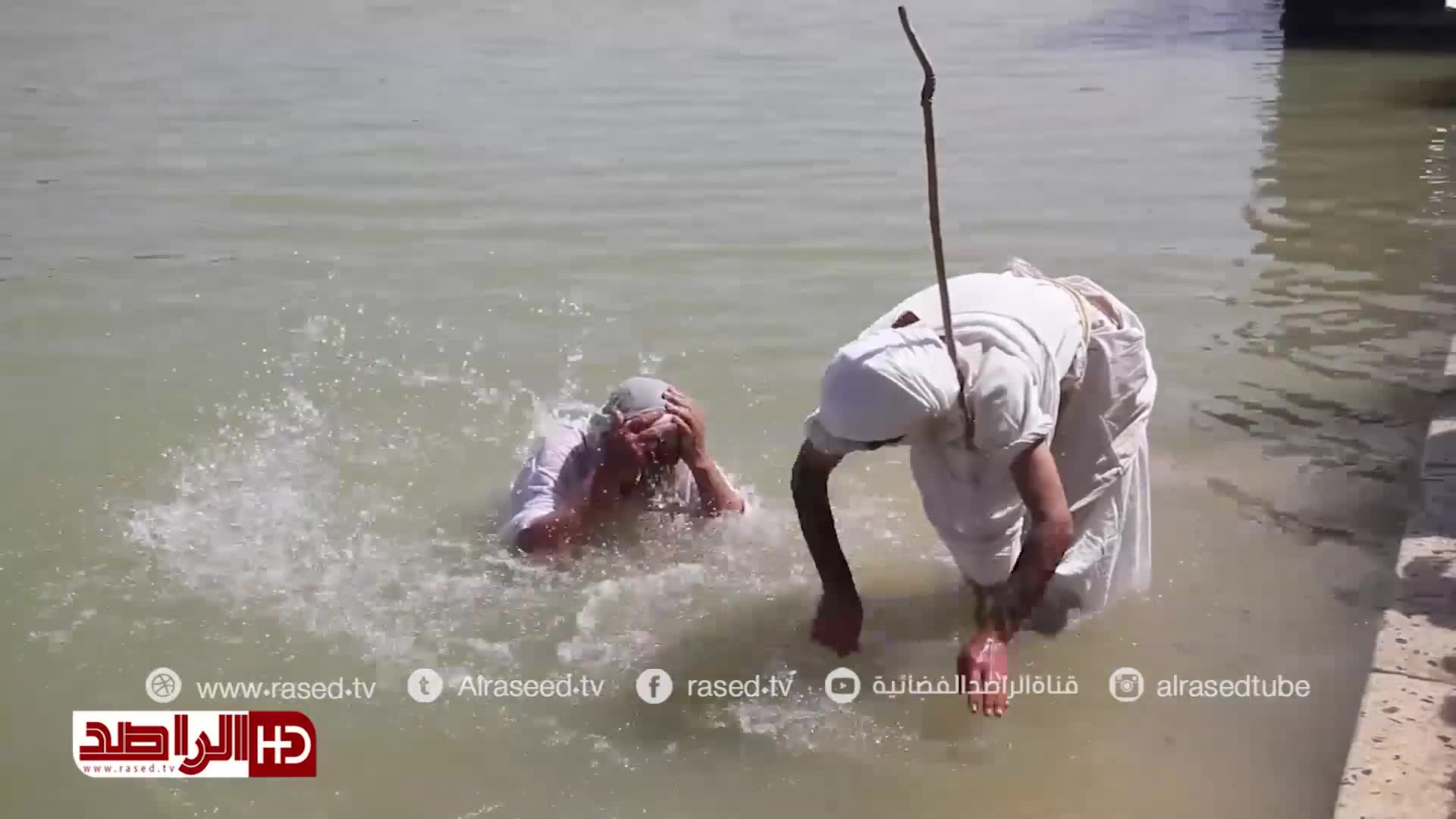

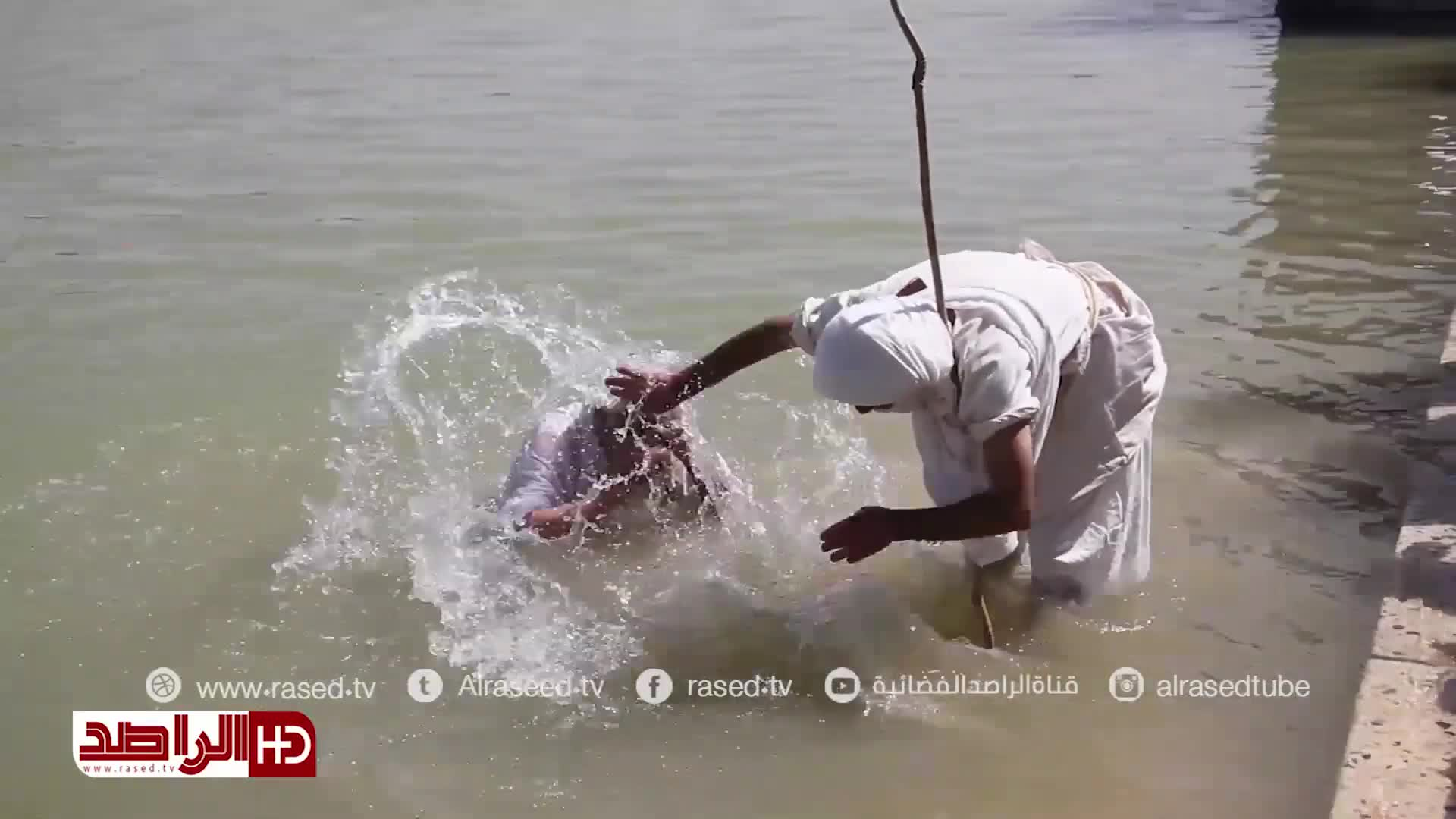

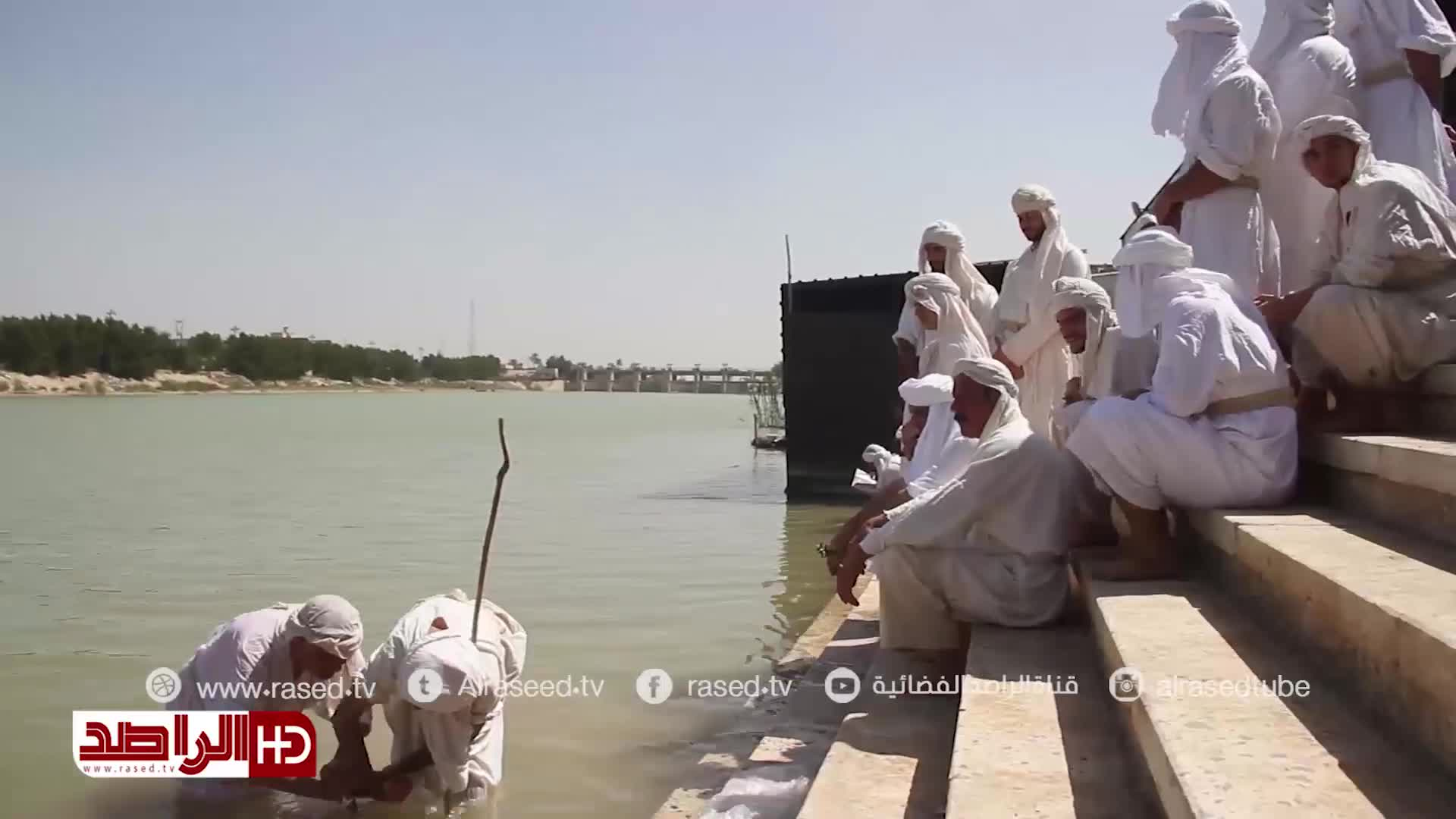

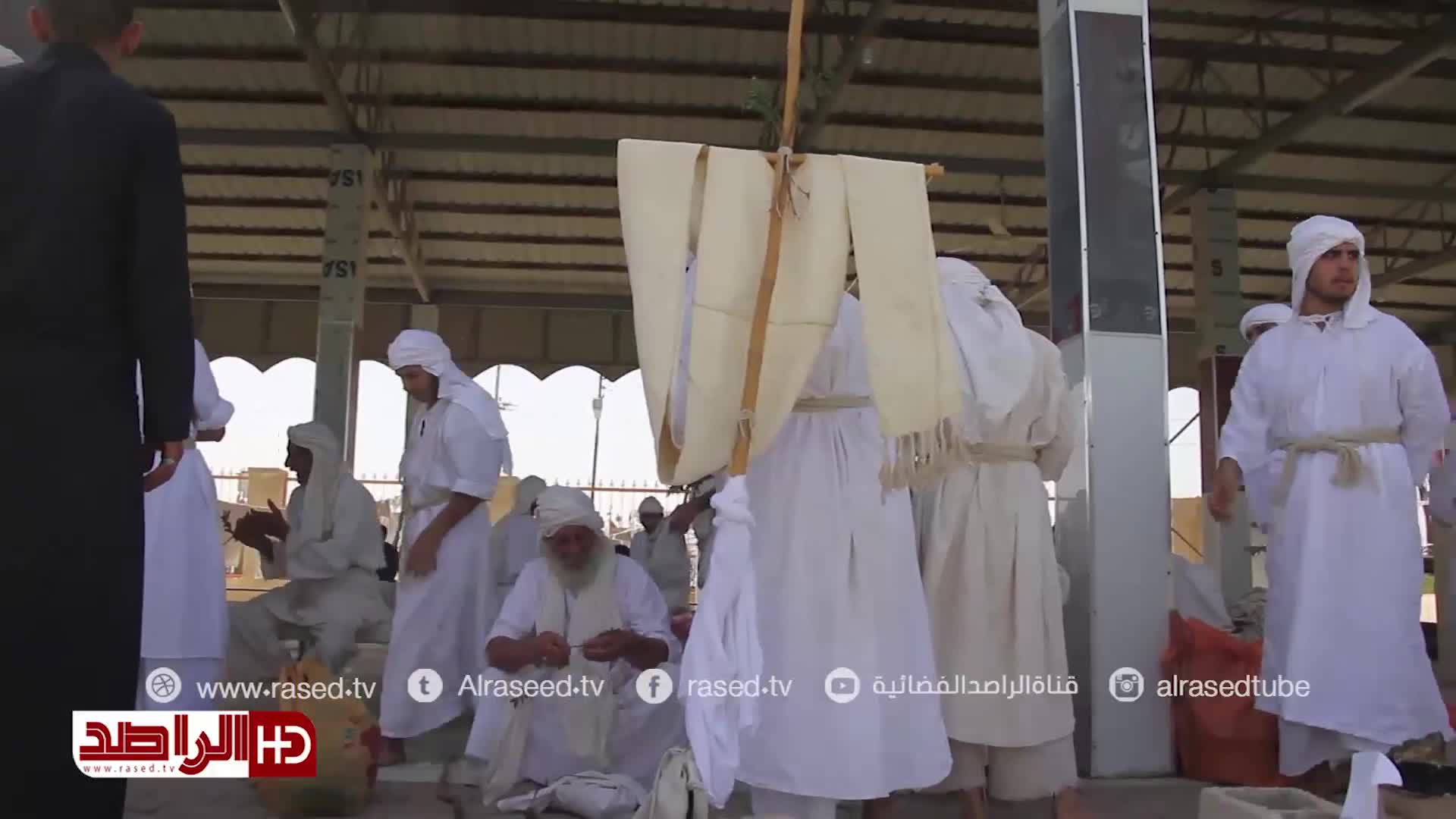

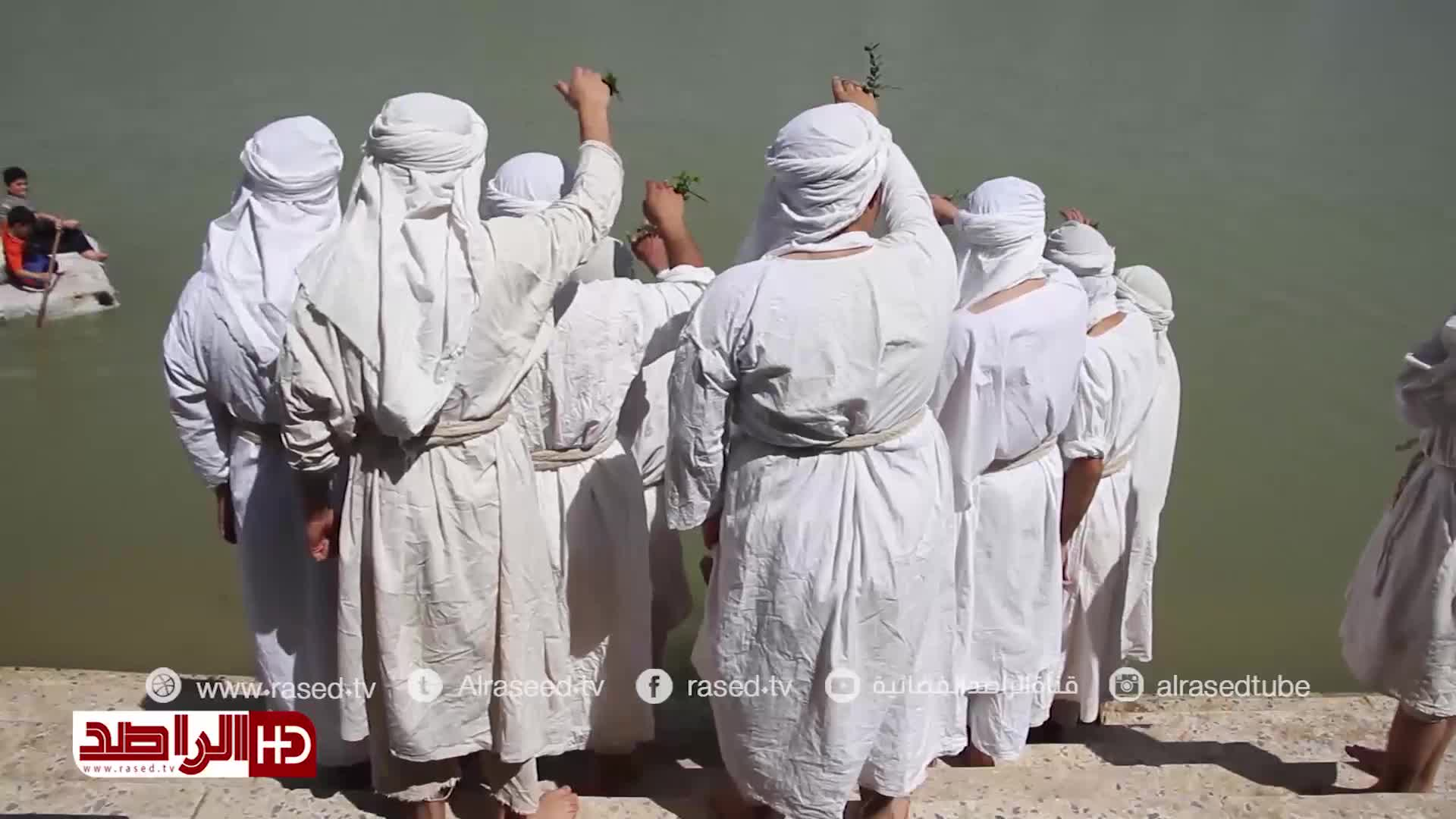

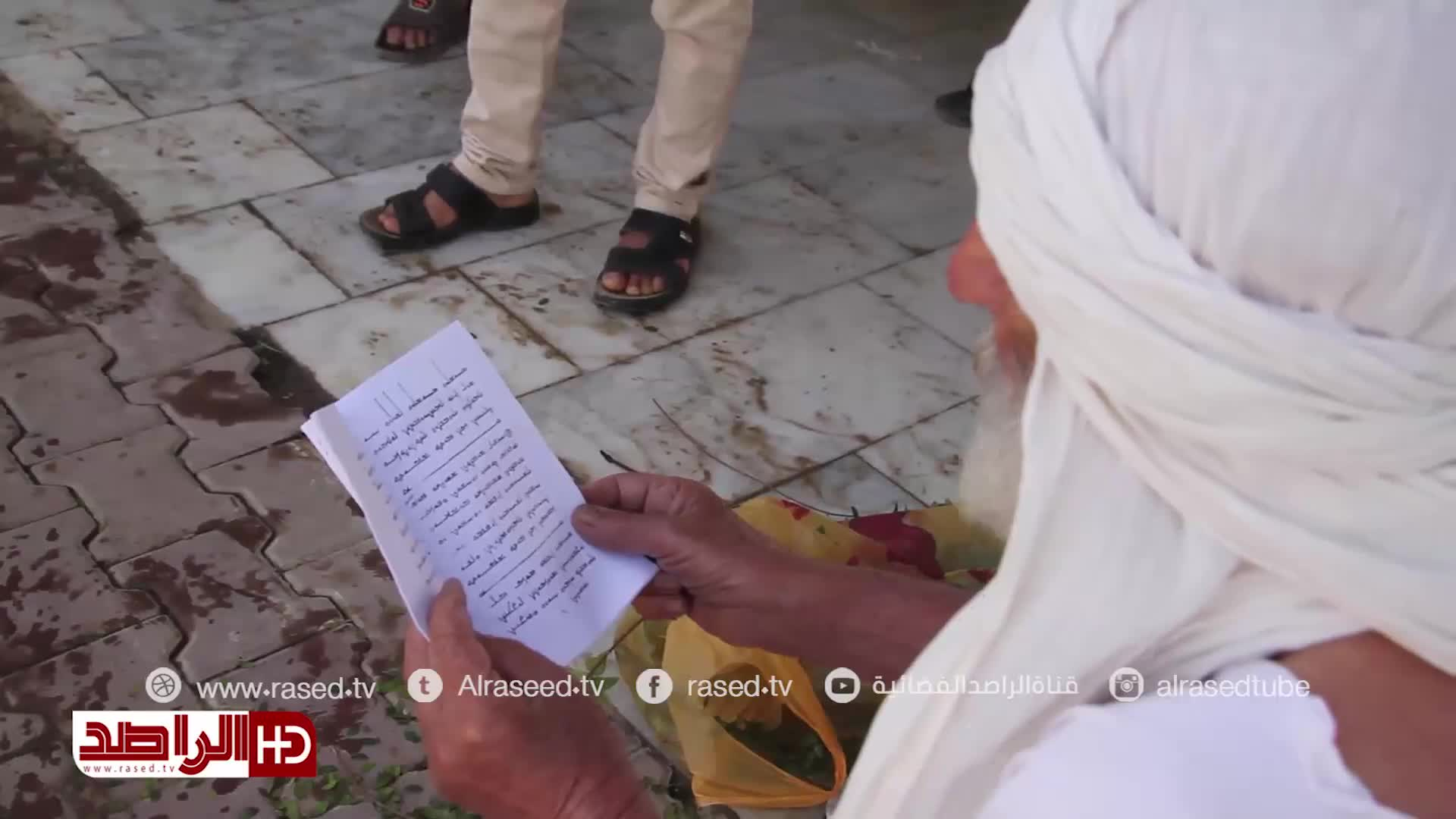

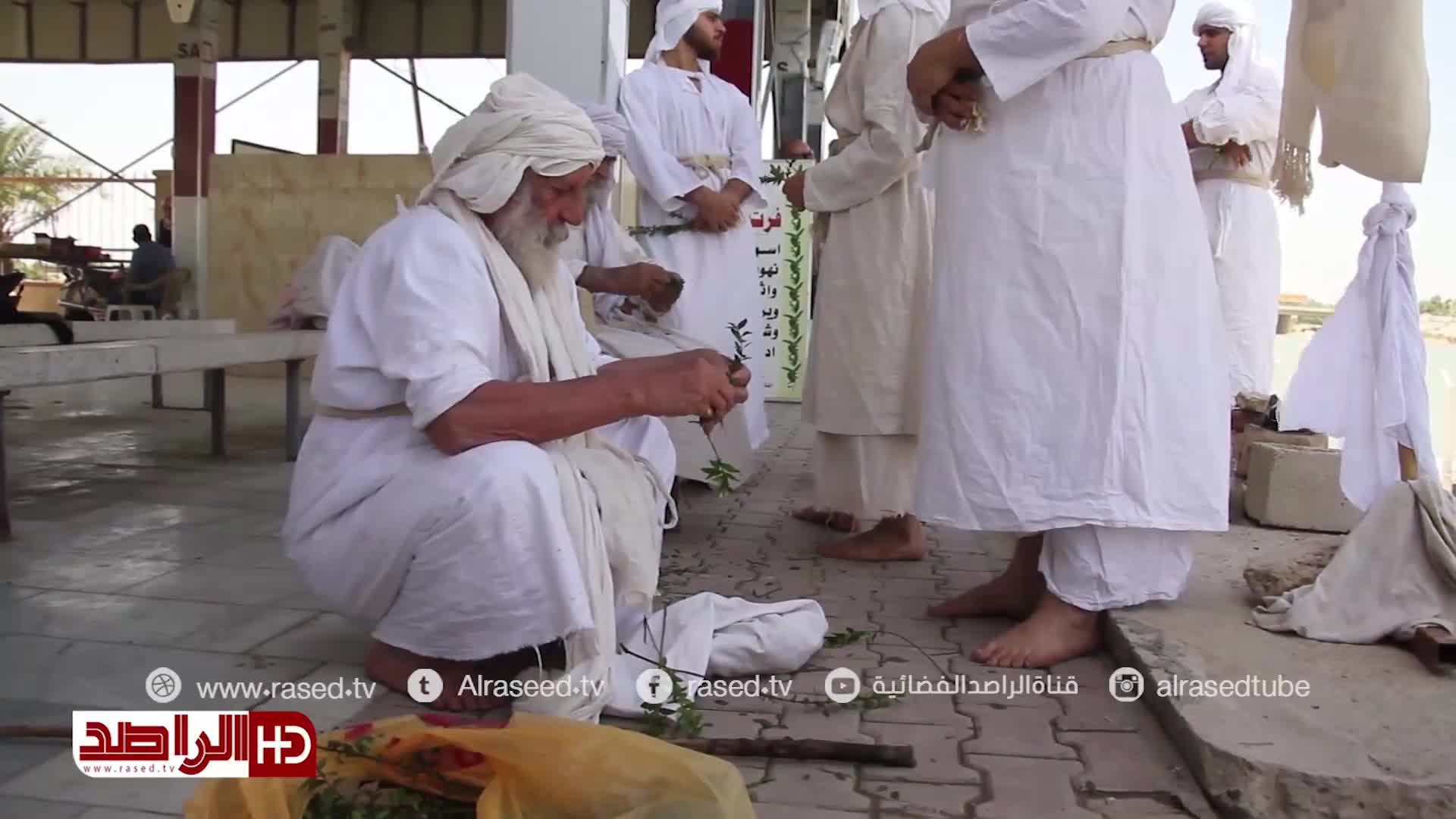

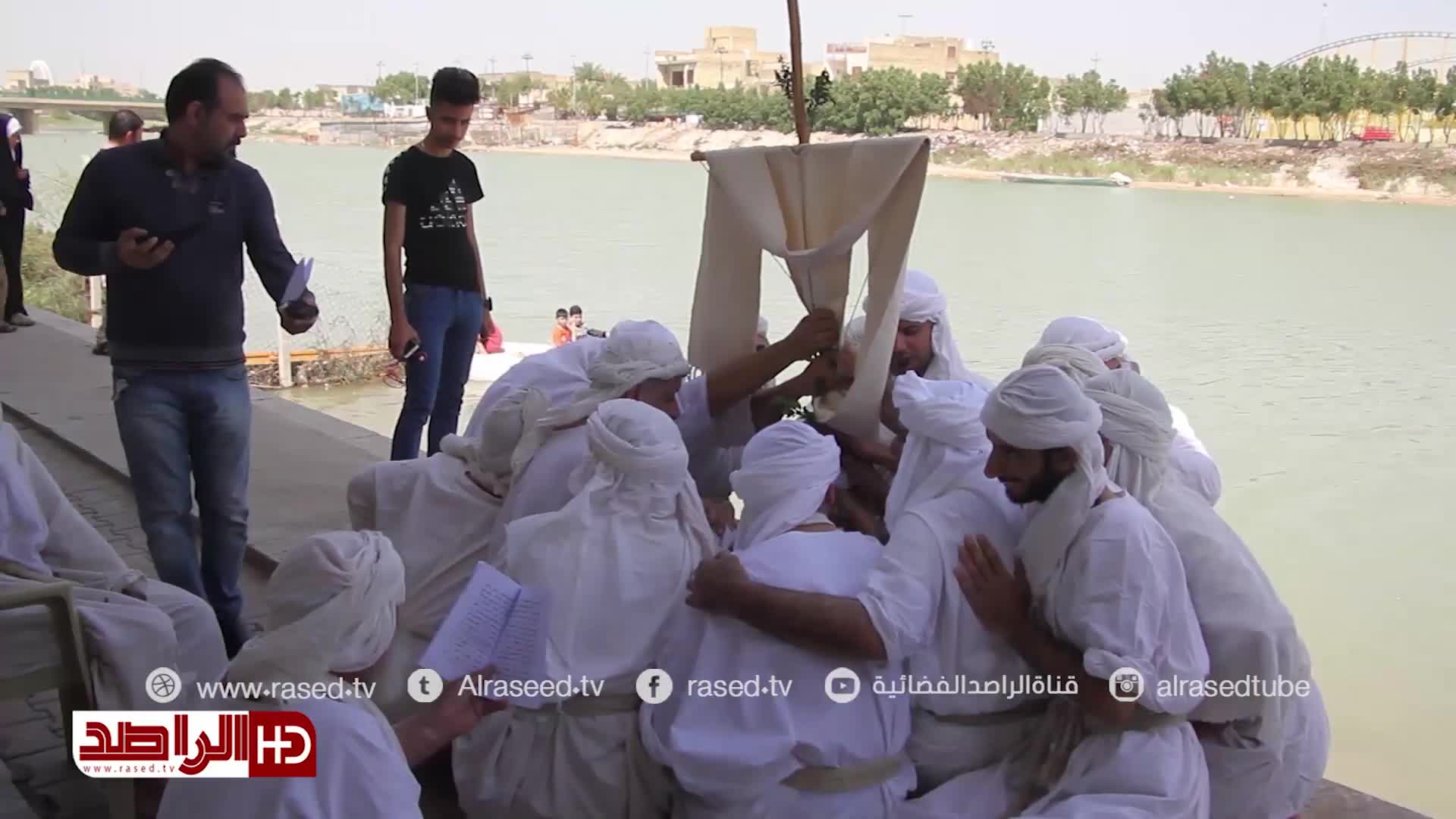

== See also ==
- Mandaean calendar
- Intercalary month (Egypt)
- Dehwa Rabba
