= Sartana (month) =

- Native name: ࡎࡀࡓࡈࡀࡍࡀ (Classical Mandaic)
- Calendar: Mandaean calendar
- Month number: 6
- Number of days: 30
- Season: abhar (spring)
- Gregorian equivalent: December / January
- Significant days: Ashoriya (Sarṭana 1)

Sarṭana (Classical Mandaic: ࡎࡀࡓࡈࡀࡍࡀ) (variant: Ṣarṭana ࡑࡀࡓࡈࡀࡍࡀ), alternatively known as Tamuz or Tammuz (Classical Mandaic: ࡕࡀࡌࡅࡆ), is the sixth month of the Mandaean calendar. Ashoriya (Ashuriyah), a day of remembrance for the drowned people of Noah's flood, is celebrated on the first day of Sarṭana. Light fasting is practiced by Mandaeans on the 9th, 15th, and 23rd days of the month.

It is the Mandaic name for the constellation Cancer. It currently corresponds to December / January in the Gregorian calendar due to a lack of a leap year in the Mandaean calendar.
