= Laufa =

Mandaean concept of spiritual communion

In Mandaeism, laufa or laupa (Classical Mandaic: ࡋࡀࡅࡐࡀ) is the concept of a spiritual connection forged between Tibil (Earth) and the World of Light. It has been variously translated as "communion," "spiritual union," "spiritual connection," or "vital connection."

== In rituals ==
Laufa between the World of Light and Tibil can be established through rituals mediated by Mandaean priests, who serve as "uthras (i.e., beings from the World of Light) on earth" during these rituals. These rituals include masbuta (baptism) and masiqta rituals. Mandaeans believe that laufa was initially established when the material world was first created. Mandaeans regularly re-establish and reconfirm this connection by regularly performing rituals with priestly assistance. Laufa can also be reconstituted through written records of unbroken ancestral lineages, such as the Ṭabahatan ("Our Ancestors") commemoration prayer in the Qulasta with its long list of ancestors' names.

According to Mandaean priest Brikha Nasoraia (2021):

... the ritual life of the Naṣoraeans is to keep relations between the earth and the heaven always open, linked by the flow of cosmic into terrestrial running waters. This is why Baptism is the central Mandaean ritual. Mandaean Gnosis is thoroughly integrated into ritual, and the wider body of 'believers' can thus participate in (or just 'feel into') a collective experience of cosmic connection.

== See also ==
- Theosis (Eastern Christian theology)
- Lofani
