= Tibil =

World or Earth in Mandaeism

In Mandaean cosmology, Tibil (Classical Mandaic: ࡕࡉࡁࡉࡋ) or occasionally Arqa ḏ-Tibil (lit. "Tibil-Earth") is the Earth (World) or earthly middle realm. It is separated from the World of Light (alma ḏ-nhūra) above and the World of Darkness (alma ḏ-hšuka) below by ayar (aether).

To reach the World of Light (alma ḏ-nhūra) from Tibil, Mandaeans believe that need they to establish laufa (connection, union) to be reunited with the World of Light. The laufa is re-created and reconfirmed by priests through rituals such as maṣbuta (baptism). Upon death, priests must perform masiqta rituals to help the departed soul successfully navigate from Tibil through the various maṭarta (watch-stations) that lie in between, in order to reach the World of Light.

== Etymology ==
Häberl (2022) considers Tibil to be a borrowing from Hebrew tebel (Hebrew: תֵבֵל).

== See also ==
- Gaia
- Midgard in Norse mythology
- Middle-earth in J. R. R. Tolkien's novels
- Ki (goddess) in Mesopotamian mythology
