= John the Baptist =

Prophet (6 BC – AD 30)

Saint John the Baptist
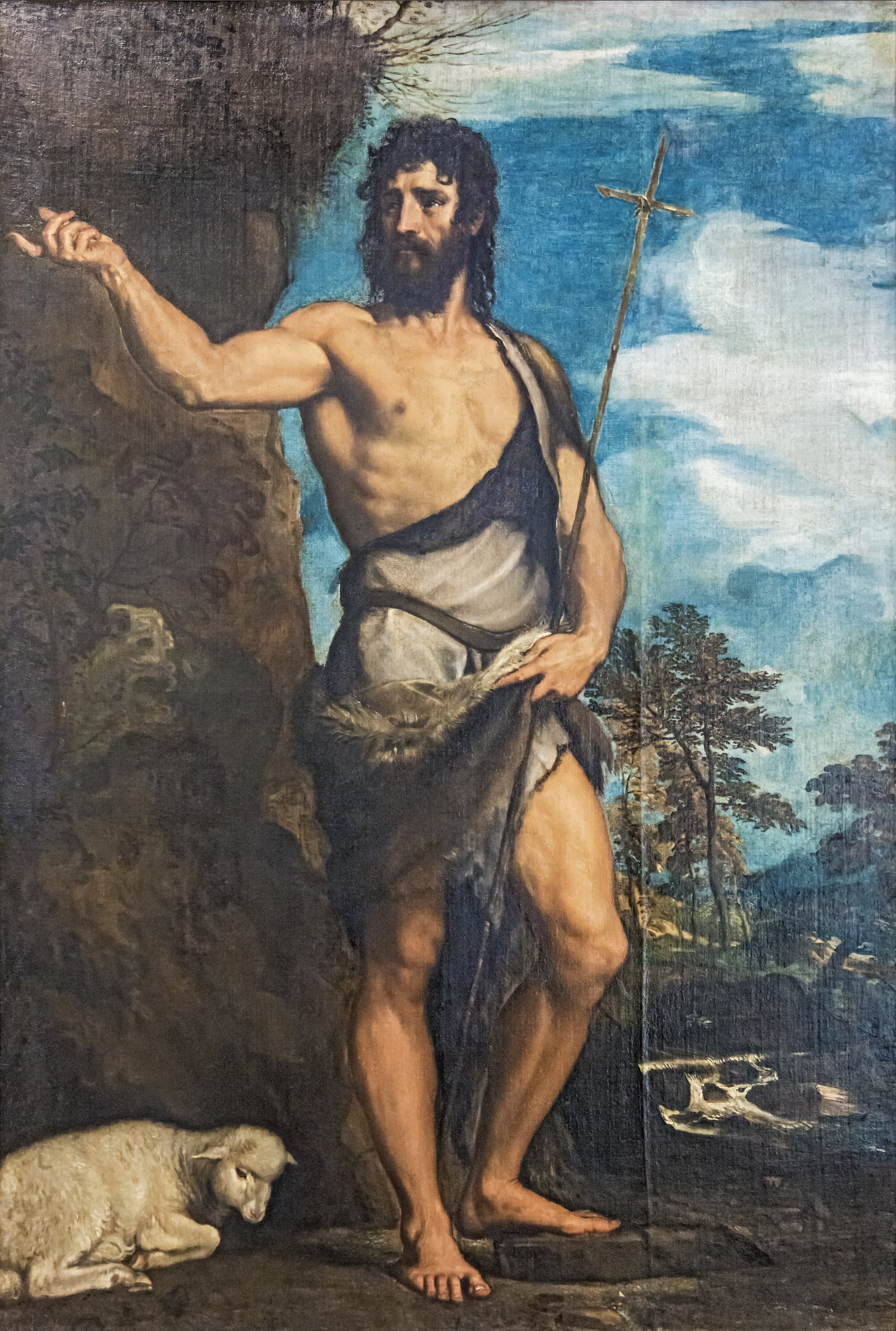
- Saint John the Baptist, a 1540 painting by Titian

Prophet Forerunner and Baptist
- Born: c. 6 BC; Herodian Kingdom of Judea, Roman Empire
- Died: c. AD 30; Machaerus, Province of Judaea, Roman Empire
- Cause of death: Decapitation
- Venerated in: Christianity (all denominations which venerate saints); Islam; Baháʼí Faith; Druze; Mandaeism
- Canonized: Pre-Congregation
- Major shrine: Church of Saint John the Baptist in Jerusalem; Umayyad Mosque in Damascus; Nabi Yahya Mosque in Sebastia; Aachen Cathedral in Aachen, Germany
- Feast: 24 June (Nativity); 29 August (Beheading); 7 January (Synaxis—Byzantine); 30 Paoni (Nativity—Coptic); 2 Thout (Beheading—Coptic); 1 Hitia (Birthday—Mandaean)
- Attributes: Camel-skin robe, cross, lamb, scroll with words Ecce Agnus Dei-, platter with own head, pouring water from hands or scallop shell
- Patronage: See Commemoration

John the Baptist (Note: Hebrew: יוחנן המטביל, romanized: Yohənān ha-Mətbīl; Ancient Greek: Ἰωάννης ὁ βαπτιστής, romanized: Iōánnēs ho baptistḗs or Ἰωάννης ὁ βαπτίζων, Iōánnēs ho baptízōn, or Ἰωάννης ὁ πρόδρομος, Iōánnēs ho pródromos; Classical Syriac: ܝܘܿܚܲܢܵܢ ܡܲܥܡܕ݂ܵܢܵܐ, romanized: Yoḥanān Maʿmḏānā; Latin: Ioannes Baptista; Coptic: ⲓⲱⲁⲛⲛⲏⲥ ⲡⲓⲡⲣⲟⲇⲣⲟⲙⲟⲥ, romanized: Ioannēs piprojromos or ⲓⲱ̅ⲁ ⲡⲓⲣϥϯⲱⲙⲥ, Iōa pirftioms; Arabic: يوحنا المعمدان, romanized: Yuḥanna al-Maʿmadān; Classical Mandaic: ࡉࡅࡄࡀࡍࡀ ࡌࡀࡑࡁࡀࡍࡀ, romanized: Iuhana Maṣbana. Amharic: መጥምቁ ዮሐንስ, romanized: Mäṭməqu Yoḥannəs; Tigrinya: ዮሐንስ መጥምቕ, romanized: Yoḥannəs Mäṭməq̣. The name "John" is the Anglicized form, via French, Latin, and then Greek, of the Hebrew, "Yochanan", which means "YHWH is gracious".) (c. 6 BC – c. AD 30) was an itinerant Jewish preacher (Hebrew name Yochanan) who was active in the area of the Jordan River in the early 1st century AD. Sometimes referred to as John the Baptizer, he is known as Saint John the Forerunner in Eastern Orthodoxy, Eastern Catholicism, and Oriental Orthodoxy, as Saint John the Immerser in the Baptist tradition, and as the prophet Yahya ibn Zakariya in Islam.

John the Baptist is revered as a major religious figure in Christianity, Islam, the Baháʼí Faith, the Druze faith, and Mandaeism; in the last of these he is considered to be the final and most vital prophet. He is regarded as a prophet of God by all of the aforementioned faiths, and is honoured as a saint in many Christian denominations.

According to the New Testament, John anticipated a messianic figure greater than himself; in the Gospels, he is portrayed as the precursor or forerunner of Jesus. According to the Gospel of Matthew, Jesus himself identifies John as "Elijah who is to come", which is a direct reference to the Book of Malachi (Malachi 4:5), as confirmed by the angel Gabriel, who announced John's birth to his father Zechariah. According to the Gospel of Luke, John and Jesus were relatives.

Some scholars think that John belonged to the Essenes, a semi-ascetic Jewish sect which expected a messiah and practised ritual baptism. John used baptism as the central symbol or sacrament of his pre-messianic movement. The majority of biblical scholars agree that John baptized Jesus, and several New Testament accounts report that some of Jesus's early followers had previously been followers of John.

According to the New Testament, John the Baptist was sentenced to death by Herod Antipas and subsequently beheaded around AD 30, after John rebuked him for divorcing his wife and then unlawfully wedding Herodias, the wife of his brother Herod Philip I. The Roman historian Josephus also mentions John in his Antiquities of the Jews, and states that he was executed by order of Herod Antipas in the fortress at Machaerus.

Followers of John persisted into the second century AD, and some proclaimed him to be the Messiah awaited by Jews. In modern times, the followers of John the Baptist are the Mandaeans, an ancient ethnoreligious group who believe that he is their greatest and final prophet. In Catholic martyrology, John is the only saint whose birth and death are both commemorated.

== Gospel narratives ==
John the Baptist is mentioned in all four canonical Gospels and the non-canonical Gospel of the Nazarenes. The Synoptic Gospels (Mark, Matthew and Luke) describe John baptising Jesus; in the Gospel of John this is inferred by many to be referred to in John 1:32.

=== In Mark ===
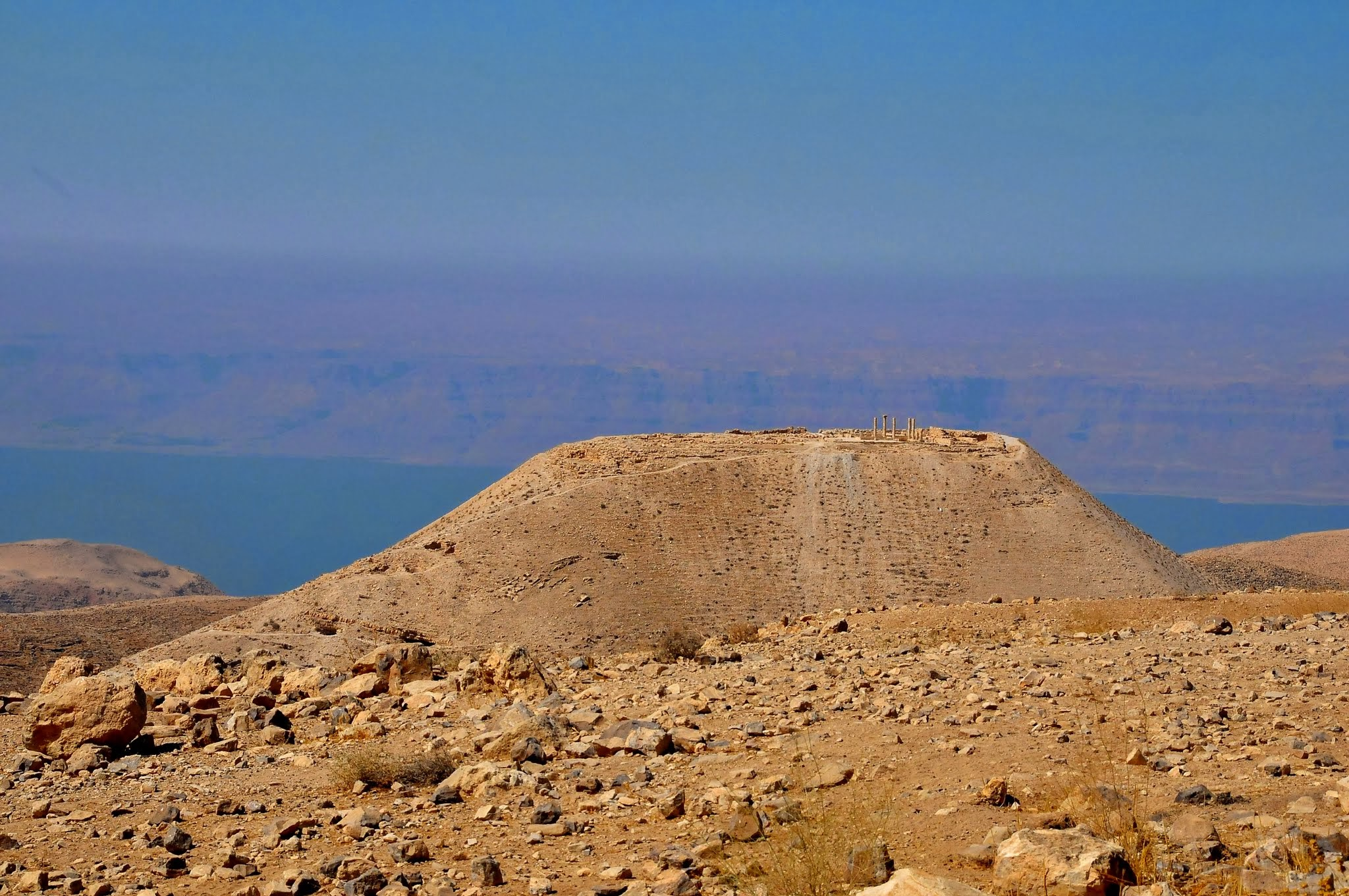
The ruins of Machaerus, a hilltop fortress overlooking the Dead Sea in modern-day Jordan, where John's decapitation reportedly took place around 32 AD.

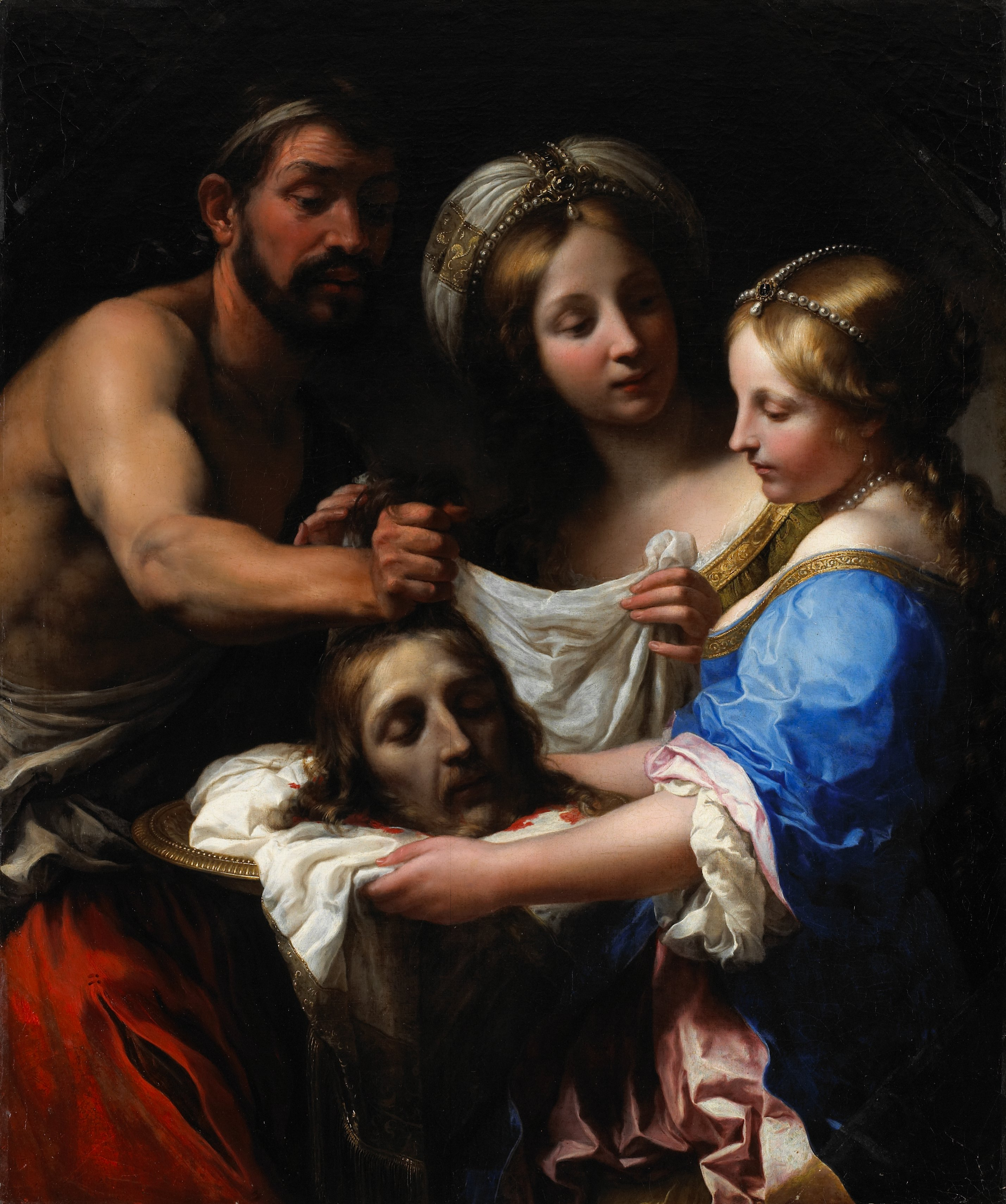
Salome is given the severed head of John the Baptist. Onorio Marinari, 1670s.

The Gospel of Mark introduces John as a fulfilment of a prophecy from the Book of Isaiah, which is a conflation of texts from Isaiah, Malachi, and Exodus, about a messenger being sent ahead, and a voice crying out in the wilderness. John is described as wearing clothes of camel's hair, and living on locusts and wild honey. John proclaims baptism of repentance for the forgiveness of sin, and says another will come after him who will not baptize with water, but with the Holy Spirit.

Jesus comes to John, and is baptized by him in the River Jordan. The account describes how, as he emerges from the water, Jesus sees the heavens open and the Holy Spirit descends on him "like a dove", and he hears a voice from heaven that says, "You are my Son, the Beloved; with you I am well pleased".

Later in the gospel there is an account of John's death. It is introduced by an incident where the Tetrarch Herod Antipas, hearing stories about Jesus, imagines that this is John the Baptist raised from the dead. It then explains that John had rebuked Herod for marrying Herodias, the ex-wife of his brother, named here as Philip. Herodias demands his execution, but Herod, who "liked to listen" to John, is reluctant to do so because he fears him, knowing he is a "righteous and holy man".

The account then describes how Herodias' unnamed daughter dances before Herod, who is pleased and offers her anything she asks for in return. When the girl asks her mother what she should request, she is told to demand the head of John the Baptist. Reluctantly, Herod orders the beheading of John, and his head is delivered to her, at her request, on a plate. John's disciples take the body away and bury it in a tomb.

The Gospel refers to Antipas as "King" and the ex-husband of Herodias is named as Philip, but he is known to have been called Herod II. Although the wording implies the girl was the daughter of Herodias, many texts describe her as "Herod's daughter, Herodias". Since these texts are early and significant and the reading is 'difficult', many scholars see this as the original version, altered in later versions and in Matthew and Luke. Josephus says that Herodias had a daughter by the name of Salome.

Many scholars have seen the story of John arrested, executed, and buried in a tomb as a conscious foreshadowing of the fate of Jesus.

=== In Matthew ===
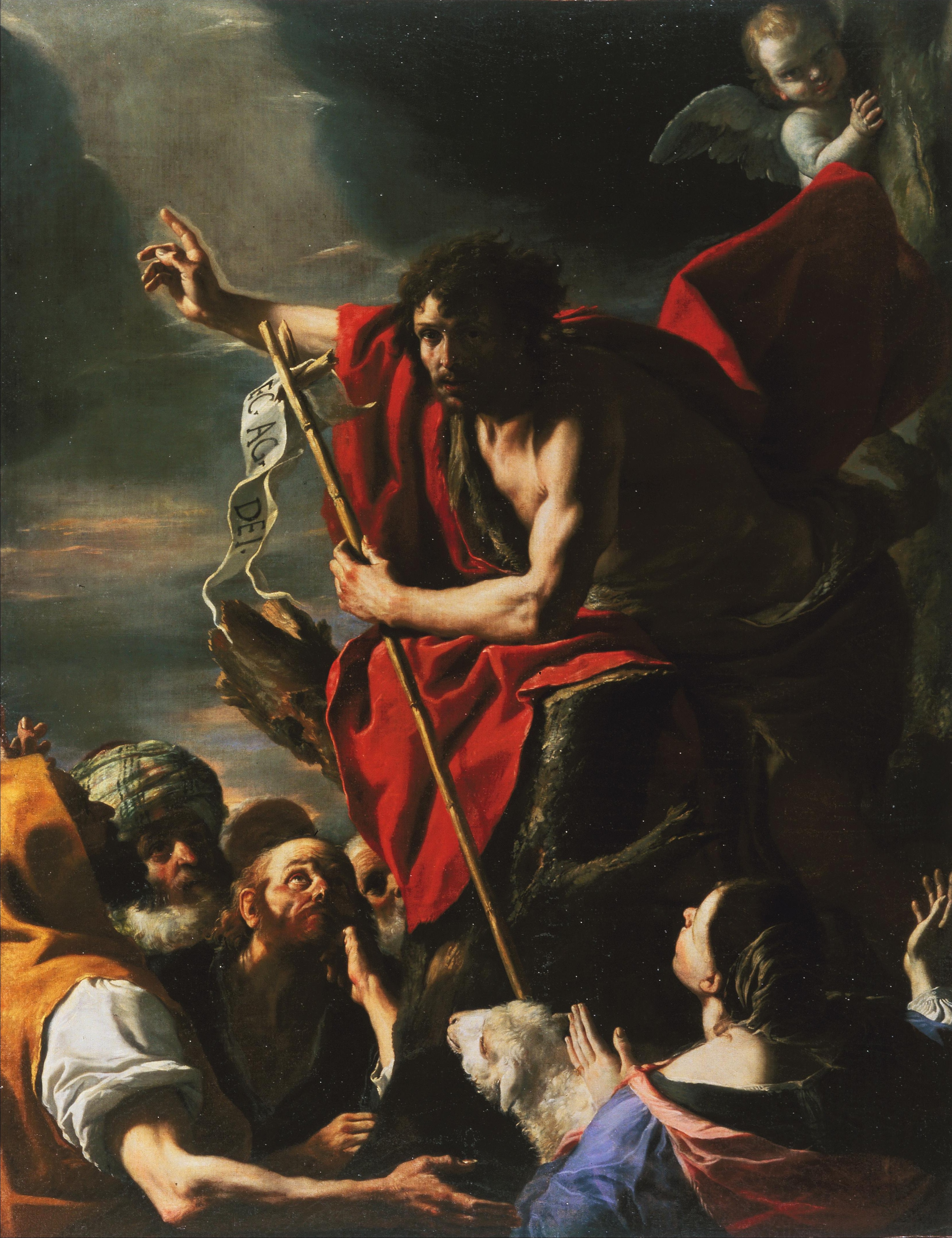
St. John the Baptist Preaching, c. 1665, by Mattia Preti

The Gospel of Matthew account begins with the same modified quotation from Isaiah, moving the Malachi and Exodus material to later in the text, where it is quoted by Jesus. The description of John is possibly taken directly from Mark ("clothing of camel's hair with a leather belt around his waist, and his food was locusts and wild honey"), along with the proclamation that one was coming who would baptize with the Holy Spirit "and fire". The book of Matthew next has Jesus coming to John to be baptized, but John objects because he is not worthy because Jesus is the one that brings the baptism in the Spirit.

Unlike Mark, Matthew describes John as critical of Pharisees and Sadducees—calling them a "brood of vipers"—and as preaching "the kingdom of heaven is at hand" and a "coming judgment".

Matthew shortens the account of the beheading of John, and adds two elements: that Herod Antipas wants John dead, and that the death is reported to Jesus by his disciples. Matthew's approach is to shift the focus away from Herod and onto John as a prototype of Jesus. Where Mark has Herod killing John reluctantly and at Herodias' insistence, Matthew describes him as wanting John dead.

=== In Luke and Acts ===
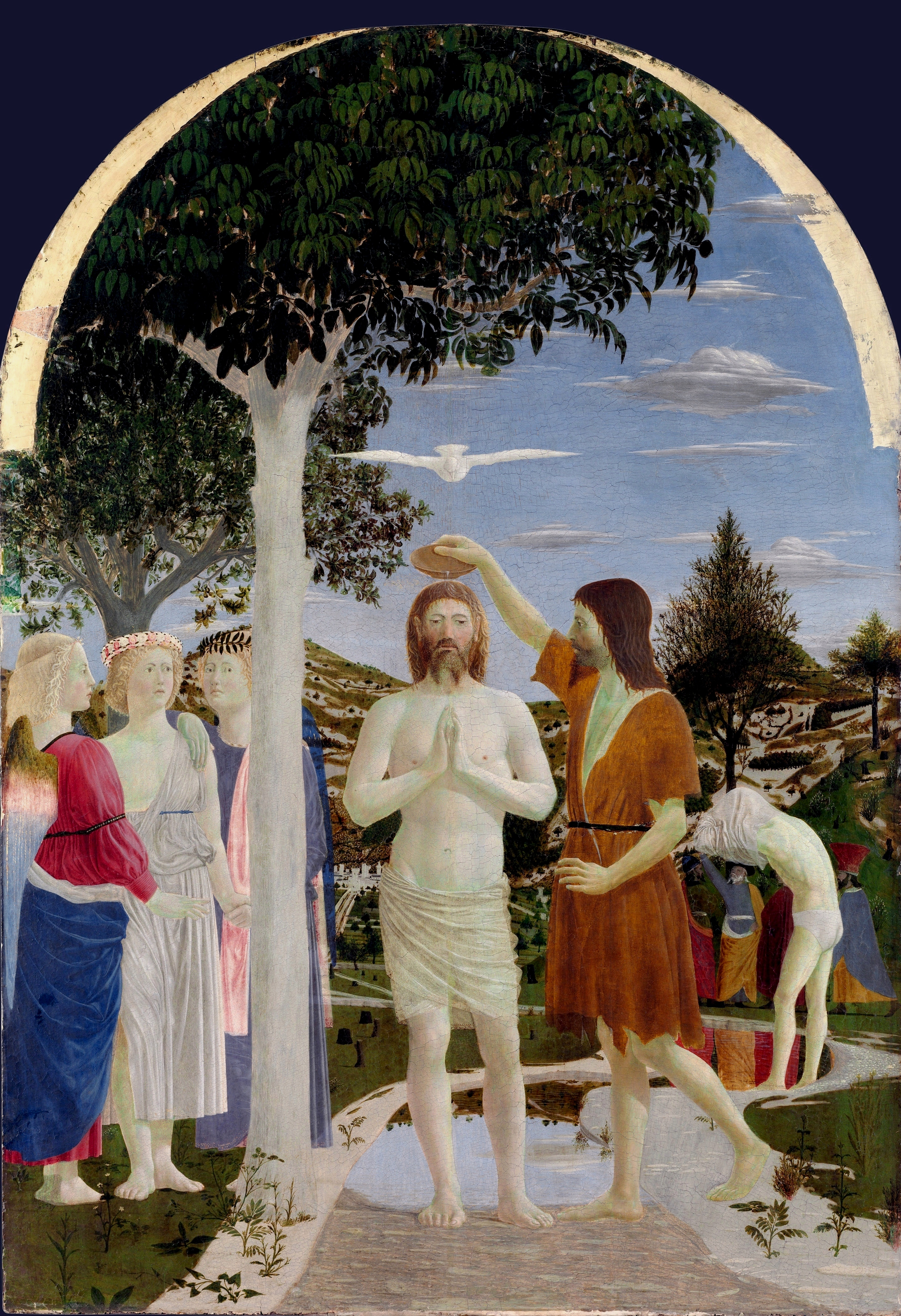
The Baptism of Jesus Christ by Piero della Francesca, c. 1448–1450

The Gospel of Luke adds an account of John's infancy, introducing him as the miraculous son of Zechariah, an old priest, and his wife Elizabeth, who was past menopause and therefore unable to have children. According to this account, the birth of John was foretold by the angel Gabriel to Zechariah while he was performing his functions as a priest in the temple of Jerusalem. Since he is described as a priest of the course of Abijah and Elizabeth as one of the daughters of Aaron, this would make John a descendant of Aaron on both his father's and mother's side. On the basis of this account, the Catholic as well as the Anglican and Lutheran liturgical calendars placed the feast of the Nativity of John the Baptist on 24 June, six months before Christmas.

Elizabeth is described as a "relative" of Mary the mother of Jesus, in Luke 1:36. There is no mention of a family relationship between John and Jesus in the other Gospels, and Raymond E. Brown has described it as "of dubious historicity". Géza Vermes has called it "artificial and undoubtedly Luke's creation". The many similarities between Luke's story of the birth of John and the Old Testament account of the birth of Samuel suggest that Luke's account of the annunciation and birth of Jesus are modelled on that of Samuel.

Uniquely in the Gospel of Luke, John explicitly teaches charity, baptizes tax-collectors, and advises soldiers. He teaches his disciples to pray. Frederic Farrar notes that John travels around the Jordan region to reach people, whereas in the accounts in the other gospels, the crowds come to him.

The text briefly mentions that John is imprisoned and later beheaded by Herod, but the Gospel of Luke lacks the story of a step-daughter dancing for Herod and requesting John's head.

The Book of Acts portrays some disciples of John becoming followers of Jesus, a development not reported by the gospels except for the early case of Andrew, Simon Peter's brother.

=== In the Gospel of John ===
The fourth gospel describes John the Baptist as "a man sent from God" who "was not the light", but "came as a witness, to bear witness to the light, so that through him everyone might believe". John confirms that he is not the Christ nor Elijah nor 'the prophet' when asked by Jewish priests and Pharisees; instead, he described himself as the "voice of one crying in the wilderness".

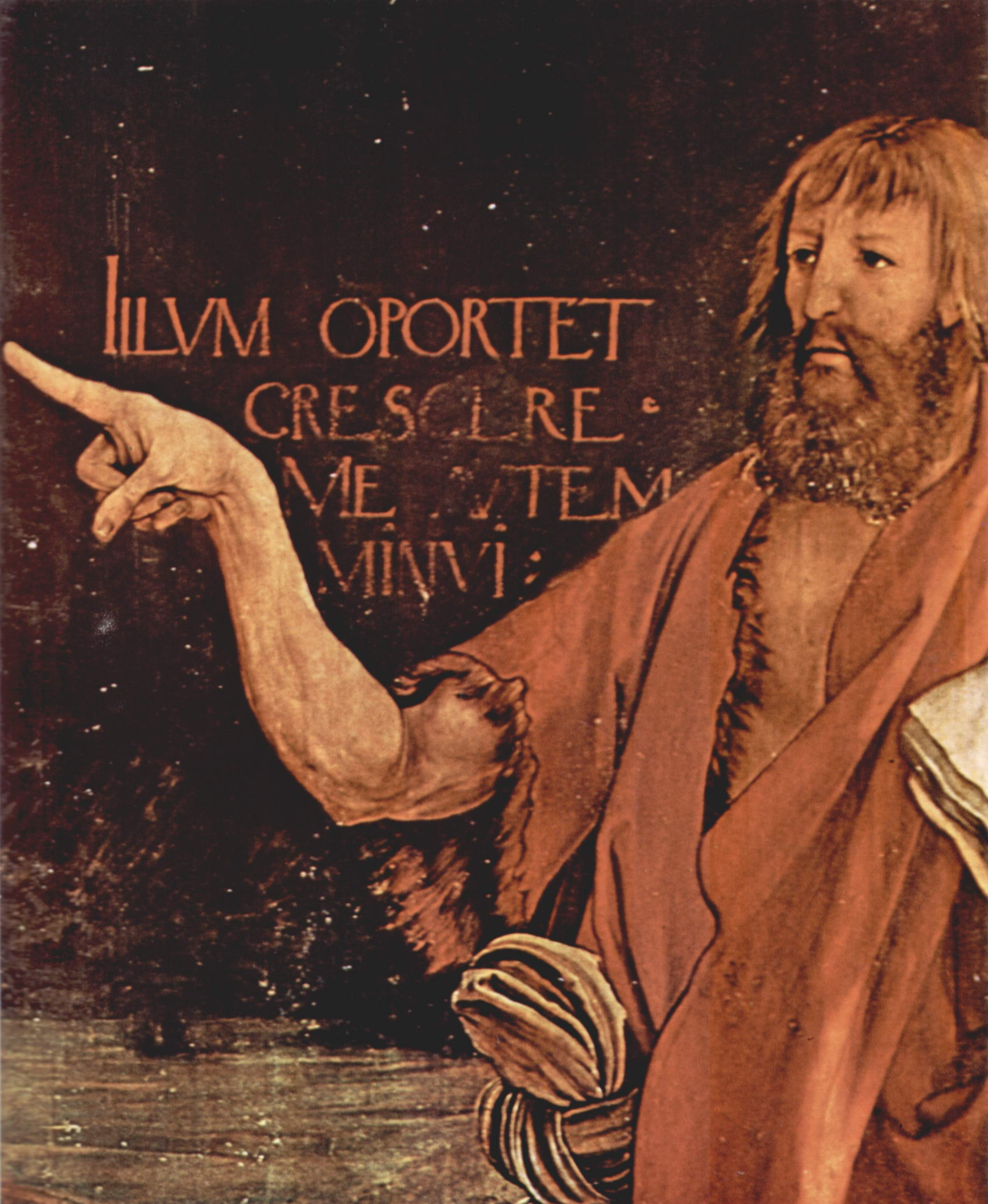
Matthias Grünewald, detail of the Isenheim Altarpiece

Jesus's baptism is implied but not depicted. Unlike the other gospels, it is John himself who testifies to seeing "the Spirit come down from heaven like a dove and rest on him". John explicitly announces that Jesus is the one "who baptizes with the Holy Spirit" and John even professes a "belief that he is the Son of God" and "the Lamb of God".

The Gospel of John reports that Jesus' disciples were baptizing and that a debate broke out between some of the disciples of John and another Jew about purification. In this debate John argued that Jesus "must become greater," while he (John) "must become less."

The Gospel of John then points out that Jesus' disciples were baptizing more people than John. Later, the Gospel relates that Jesus regarded John as "a burning and shining lamp, and you were willing to rejoice for a while in his light".

=== Comparative analysis ===
All four Gospels start Jesus' ministry in association with the appearance of John the Baptist. Simon J. Joseph has argued that the Gospel demotes the historical John by depicting him as a prophetic forerunner to Jesus whereas his ministry actually complemented Jesus'.

==== The prophecy of Isaiah ====
Although the Gospel of Mark implies that the arrival of John the Baptist is the fulfilment of a prophecy from the Book of Isaiah, the words quoted ("I will send my messenger ahead of you, who will prepare your way – a voice of one calling in the wilderness, 'Prepare the way for the Lord, make straight paths for him.'") are a composite of texts from Isaiah, Malachi and the Book of Exodus. Matthew and Luke do not include the first part of the reference.

==== Baptism of Jesus ====
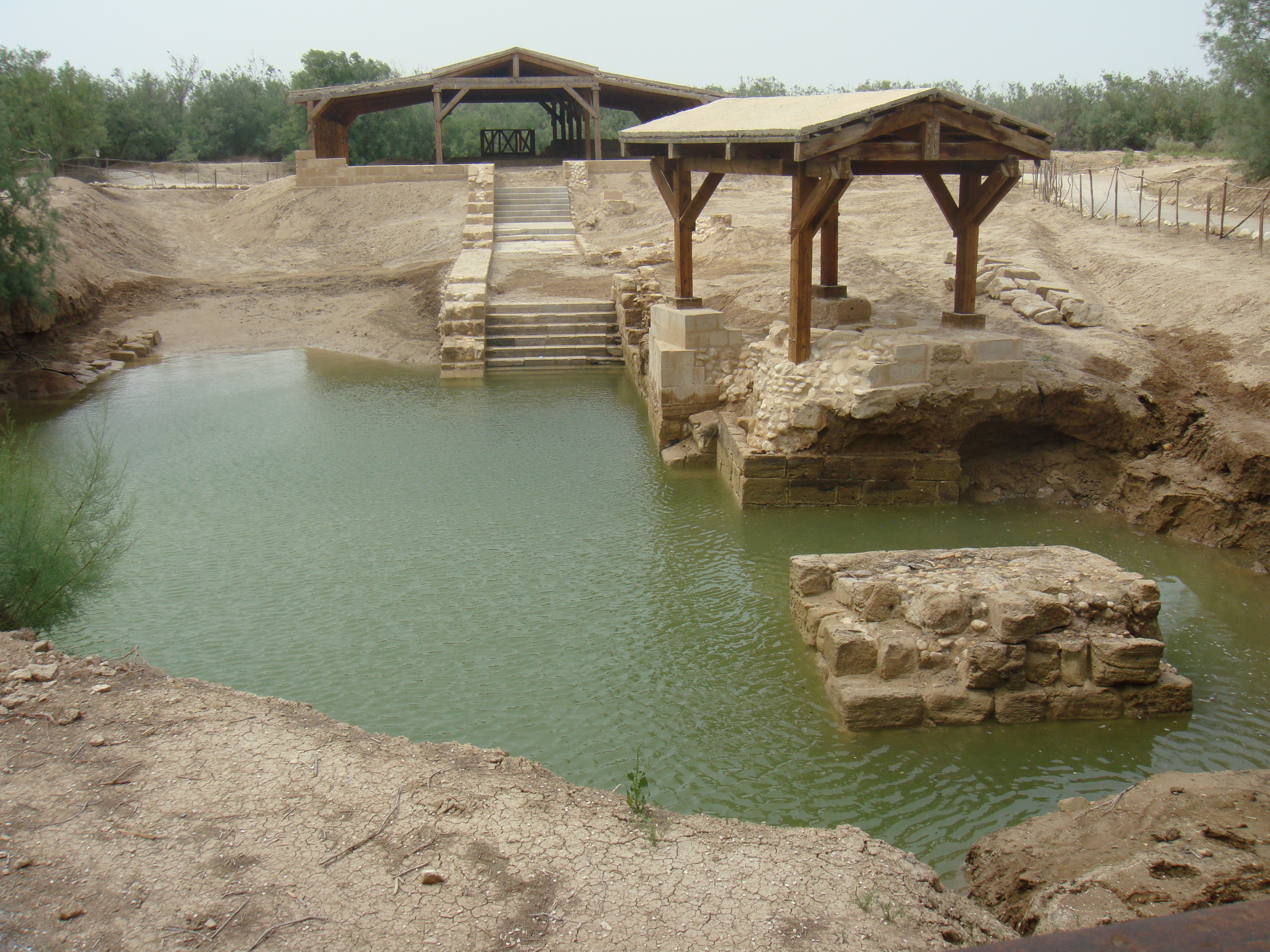
The ruins of Al-Maghtas on the eastern side of the Jordan River in modern-day Jordan, where the Baptism of Jesus and the ministry of John reportedly took place around 30 AD

Limestone relief of John the Baptist from Zakynthos, Byzantine and Christian Museum, Greece

The gospels differ on the details of the Baptism. In Mark and Luke, it is Jesus who sees the heavens open and hears a voice address him personally, saying, "You are my dearly loved son; you bring me great joy". They do not clarify whether others saw and heard these things. Although other incidents where the "voice came out of heaven" are recorded in which, for the sake of the crowds, it was heard audibly, John did say in his witness that he saw the spirit coming down "out of heaven".

In Matthew, the voice from heaven does not address Jesus personally, saying instead "This is my beloved son, in whom I am well pleased."

In the Gospel of John, John the Baptist sees the spirit descend as a dove, testifying about the experience as evidence of Jesus's status.

==== John's knowledge of Jesus ====
John's knowledge of Jesus varies across gospels. In the Gospel of Mark, John preaches of a coming leader, but shows no signs of recognizing that Jesus is this leader. In Matthew, however, John immediately recognizes Jesus and John questions his own worthiness to baptize Jesus. In both Matthew and Luke, John later dispatches disciples to question Jesus about his status, asking "Are you he who is to come, or shall we look for another?" In Luke, John is a familial relative of Jesus whose birth was foretold by Gabriel. In the Gospel of John, John the Baptist himself sees the spirit descend like a dove and he explicitly preaches that Jesus is the Son of God.

==== John and Elijah ====
The Gospels vary in their depiction of John's relationship to Elijah. Matthew and Mark describe John's attire in a way reminiscent of the description of Elijah in 2 Kings 1:8, who also wore a garment of hair and a leather belt. In Matthew, Jesus explicitly teaches that John is "Elijah who was to come" (Matthew 11:14 – see also Matthew 17:11–13); many Christian theologians have taken this to mean that John was Elijah's successor. In the Gospel of John, John the Baptist explicitly denies being Elijah. In the annunciation narrative in Luke, an angel appears to Zechariah, John's father, and tells him that John "will turn many of the sons of Israel to the Lord their God," and that he will go forth "in the spirit and power of Elijah."

The following comparison table is primarily based on the New International Version (NIV) English translation of the New Testament. The account of Flavius Josephus in Antiquities of the Jews was translated by William Whiston.

	Matthew	Mark	Luke–Acts	John	Josephus
Prologue			Luke 1:5–80: Birth of John the Baptist	John 1:6–18: Prologue about John the Baptist's identity and mission	
Ministry	Matthew 3:1–17: John the Baptist preached to people and baptised them in the Jordan.; John the Baptist baptised Jesus.	Mark 1:4–11: John the Baptist preached to people and baptised them in the Jordan.; John the Baptist baptised Jesus.	Luke 3:1–22; Acts 1:5, 1:21–22, 10:37–38, 11:16, 13:24–25, 18:25, 19:3–4: John the Baptist preached to people and baptised them in the Jordan.; John the Baptist baptised Jesus.	John 1:19–42, 3:22–36, 4:1: John the Baptist preached to people and baptised them in the Jordan. He denied being the Messiah.; It is unstated whether or not John the Baptist baptised Jesus. He insisted Jesus was superior: the Son/Lamb of God.; Two of John the Baptist's disciples – including Andrew – defected to Jesus at John's own insistence.; John the Baptist baptised at Enon/Salim before being arrested. His disciples told him Jesus was successful; John endorsed Jesus as his superior and the Son of God.; Jesus heard the rumour he was more successful than John.	Jewish Antiquities 18. 5. 2.: John the Baptist preached to people and baptised them.
Prison	Matthew 11:2–7, 14:6–12: John the Baptist criticised king Herod Antipas for marrying his brother's ex-wife Herodias.; John the Baptist was therefore arrested by Herod Antipas.; John the Baptist, in prison, heard about Jesus' deeds, sent some disciples to ask if Jesus was the awaited one. Jesus listed his miracles and said: 'Blessed is he who does not reject me'. The disciples returned to John the Baptist.; Herod wanted to kill John, but was afraid of the people.; John the Baptist was executed by beheading by Herod Antipas on the request of Herodias' daughter. His disciples buried his remains and told Jesus.	Mark 1:14, 6:17–29: John the Baptist criticised king Herod Antipas for marrying his brother's ex-wife Herodias.; John the Baptist was therefore arrested by Herod Antipas.; Herodias wanted John killed, but Herod Antipas protected John because he knew John was a just and holy man.; John the Baptist was executed by beheading by Herod Antipas on the request of Herodias' daughter. His disciples buried his remains.	Luke 3:19–20, 7:18–25, 9:9: John the Baptist criticised king Herod Antipas for marrying his brother's ex-wife Herodias and other evils.; John the Baptist was therefore arrested by Herod Antipas.; John the Baptist [in prison?] heard about Jesus' deeds (in Capernaum and Nain), sent 2 disciples to ask if Jesus was the awaited one. Jesus listed his miracles and said: 'Blessed is he who does not reject me.' The disciples returned to John the Baptist.; [no execution motive mentioned]; John the Baptist was executed by beheading by Herod Antipas.	John 3:24: [no arrest motive mentioned]; John the Baptist was arrested.; [no execution motive mentioned]; [no execution mentioned]	Jewish Antiquities 18. 5. 2.: John the Baptist gained a large following.; Herod Antipas feared the widely popular John the Baptist would incite his followers to launch a rebellion against his rule.; Therefore, he had John the Baptist arrested and imprisoned at Macherus.; Herod Antipas later had John the Baptist executed 'to prevent any mischief he might cause, and not bring himself into difficulties'.
Epilogue	Matthew 14:1–6: Word of Jesus' miracles spread.; Herod Antipas concluded Jesus was actually John the Baptist risen from the dead.	Mark 6:14–16: Word of Jesus' miracles spread; some people believed Jesus was actually John the Baptist risen from the dead, others believed he was Elijah, still others he was like a prophet of the past.; Herod Antipas agreed with those saying Jesus was actually John the Baptist risen from the dead.	Luke 9:7–9: Word of Jesus' miracles spread; some people believed Jesus was actually John the Baptist risen from the dead, others believed he was Elijah, still others that an old prophet had risen.; Herod Antipas did not believe Jesus was John the Baptist, but had to be someone else.	John 5:30–38: Jesus said his claims were reliable, because he knew John the Baptist's testimony about Jesus was reliable, even though Jesus did not need human testimony.; John 10:40–42: The narrator downplays John the Baptist's deeds in comparison to Jesus, and claims John's testimony of Jesus had convinced many people to believe in Jesus.	Jewish Antiquities 18. 5. 2.: Some Jews believed God later destroyed Herod Antipas' army as a punishment, because he had unjustly executed John the Baptist.

== In Josephus's Antiquities of the Jews ==
An account of John the Baptist (Greek: Iōánnēs ho baptízōn) is found in all extant manuscripts of Antiquities of the Jews (book 18, chapter 5, 2) by the Roman Jewish historian Flavius Josephus (37–100):

Now some of the Jews thought that the destruction of Herod's [Antipas's] army came from God, and that very justly, as a punishment of what he did against John, that was called the Baptist: for Herod slew him, who was a good man, and commanded the Jews to exercise virtue, both as to righteousness towards one another, and piety towards God, and so to come to baptism; for that the washing [with water] would be acceptable to him, if they made use of it, not in order to the putting away [or the remission] of some sins [only], but for the purification of the body; supposing still that the soul was thoroughly purified beforehand by righteousness.

Now when [many] others came in crowds about him, for they were very greatly moved [or pleased] by hearing his words, Herod, who feared lest the great influence John had over the people might put it into his power and inclination to raise a rebellion, (for they seemed ready to do any thing he should advise,) thought it best, by putting him to death, to prevent any mischief he might cause, and not bring himself into difficulties, by sparing a man who might make him repent of it when it would be too late.

Accordingly he was sent a prisoner, out of Herod's suspicious temper, to Macherus, the castle I before mentioned, and was there put to death. Now the Jews had an opinion that the destruction of this army was sent as a punishment upon Herod, and a mark of God's displeasure to him.

According to this passage, the execution of John was blamed for the defeat Herod suffered. Some have claimed that this passage indicates that John died near the time of the destruction of Herod's army in AD 36. However, in a different passage, Josephus states that the end of Herod's marriage with Aretas's daughter (after which John was killed) was only the beginning of hostilities between Herod and Aretas, which later escalated into the battle.

Biblical scholar John Dominic Crossan differentiates between Josephus's account of John and Jesus, saying, "John had a monopoly, but Jesus had a franchise." To get baptized, Crossan writes, a person went only to John; to stop the movement one only needed to stop John (therefore his movement ended with his death). Jesus invited all to come and see how he and his companions had already accepted the government of God, entered it and were living it. Such a communal praxis was not just for himself, but could survive without him, unlike John's movement.

== Relics ==
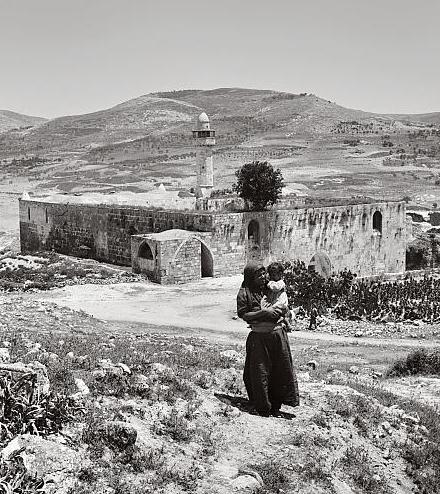
Nabi Yahya Mosque, traditionally held as the burial site of John the Baptist, in Sebastia, near Nablus

Matthew 14:12 records that "his disciples came and took away [John's] body and buried it." Theologian Joseph Benson refers to a belief that they managed to do so because "it seems that the body had been thrown over the prison walls, without burial, probably by order of Herodias."

=== The fate of his head ===
What became of the head of John the Baptist is difficult to determine. Ancient historians Josephus, Nicephorus and Symeon Metaphrastes assumed that Herodias had it buried in the fortress of Machaerus.

An Eastern Orthodox tradition holds that, after being buried, the head was discovered by John's followers and was taken to the Mount of Olives, where it was twice buried and discovered, the latter events giving rise to the Orthodox feast of the First and Second Finding of the Head of St. John the Baptist. Other writers say that it was interred in Herod's palace in Jerusalem; there it was found during the reign of Constantine, and thence secretly taken to Emesa (modern Homs, in Syria), where it was concealed, the place remaining unknown for years, until it was manifested by revelation in 452, an event celebrated in the Orthodox Church as the Third Finding.

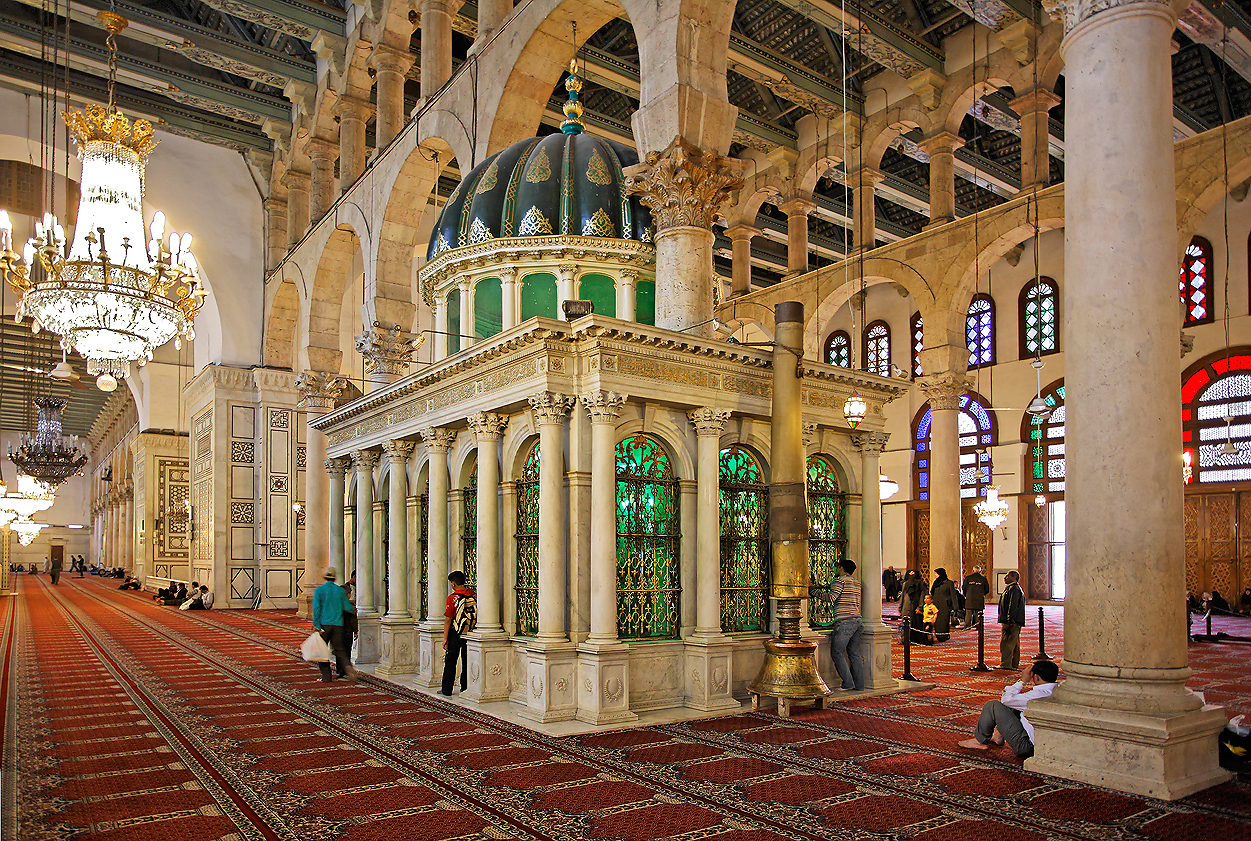
Shrine of John the Baptist in the Umayyad Mosque, which purportedly houses John the Baptist's head

Two Catholic churches and one mosque claim to have the head of John the Baptist: the Umayyad Mosque, in Damascus (Syria); the church of San Silvestro in Capite, in Rome; and Amiens Cathedral, in France (the French king would have had it brought from Constantinople after the Fourth Crusade). A fourth claim is made by the Residenz Museum in Munich, Germany, which keeps a reliquary containing what the Wittelsbach rulers of Bavaria believed to be the head of Saint John.

=== Right hand relics ===
According to the Christian Arab Ibn Butlan, the church of Cassian in Antioch held the right arm of John the Baptist until it was smuggled to Chalcedon and later to Constantinople. An Orthodox Christian monastery in Cetinje, Montenegro, and the Catholic Cathedral of Siena, in Italy, both claim to have John the Baptist's right arm and hand, with which he baptised Jesus. According to the Catholic account, in 1464 Pope Pius II donated what was identified as the right arm and hand of John the Baptist to the Siena Cathedral. The donation charter identifies the relic as "the arm of blessed John the Baptist. And this is the very arm that baptized the Lord." The relic is displayed on the high altar of the Siena Cathedral annually in June.

Topkapi Palace, in Istanbul, claims to have John's right hand index finger.

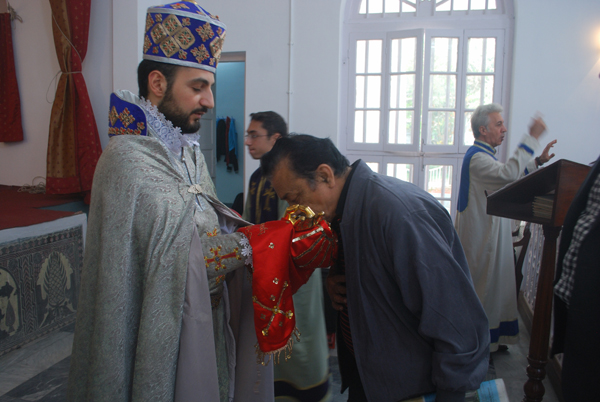
A Kolkata Armenian kisses the hand of St John the Baptist at Chinsurah.

=== Various relics and traditions ===
==== Right hand – St. John the Baptist Church of Chinsurah (India) ====
John the Baptist's right hand is allegedly preserved in the Armenian Apostolic Church of St. John at Chinsurah, West Bengal, in India, where each year on "Chinsurah Day" in January it blesses the Armenian Christians of Calcutta.

==== Decapitation cloth ====
The decapitation cloth of Saint John, the cloth which covered his head after his execution, is said to be kept at the Aachen Cathedral, in Germany.

==== Historic Armenia ====
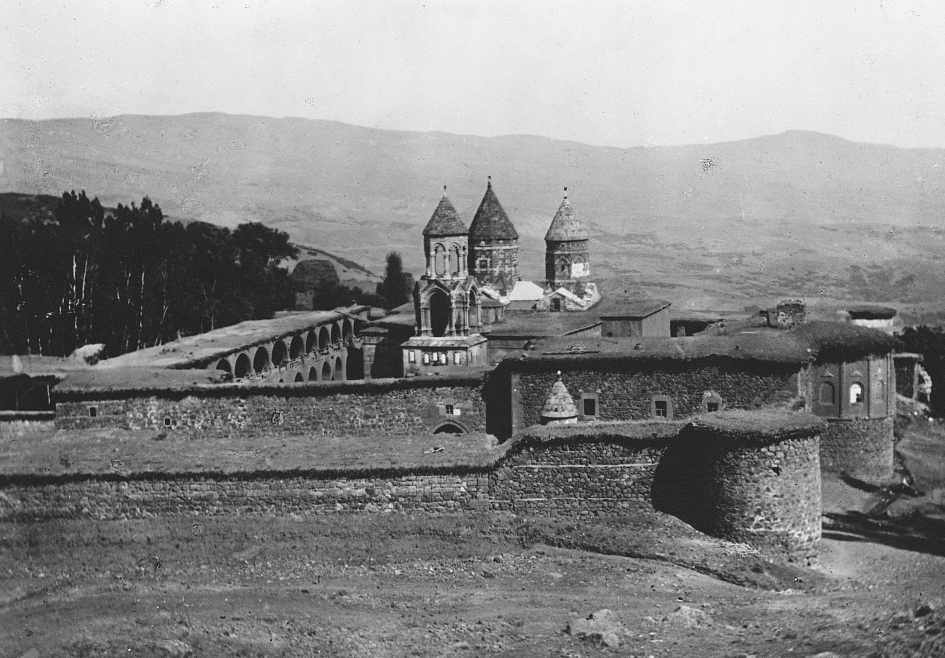
Saint Karapet Monastery, where Armenian tradition holds that his remains were laid to rest by Gregory the Illuminator

According to Armenian tradition, the remains of John the Baptist would in some point have been transferred by Gregory the Illuminator to the Saint Karapet Armenian Monastery.

==== Bulgaria ====
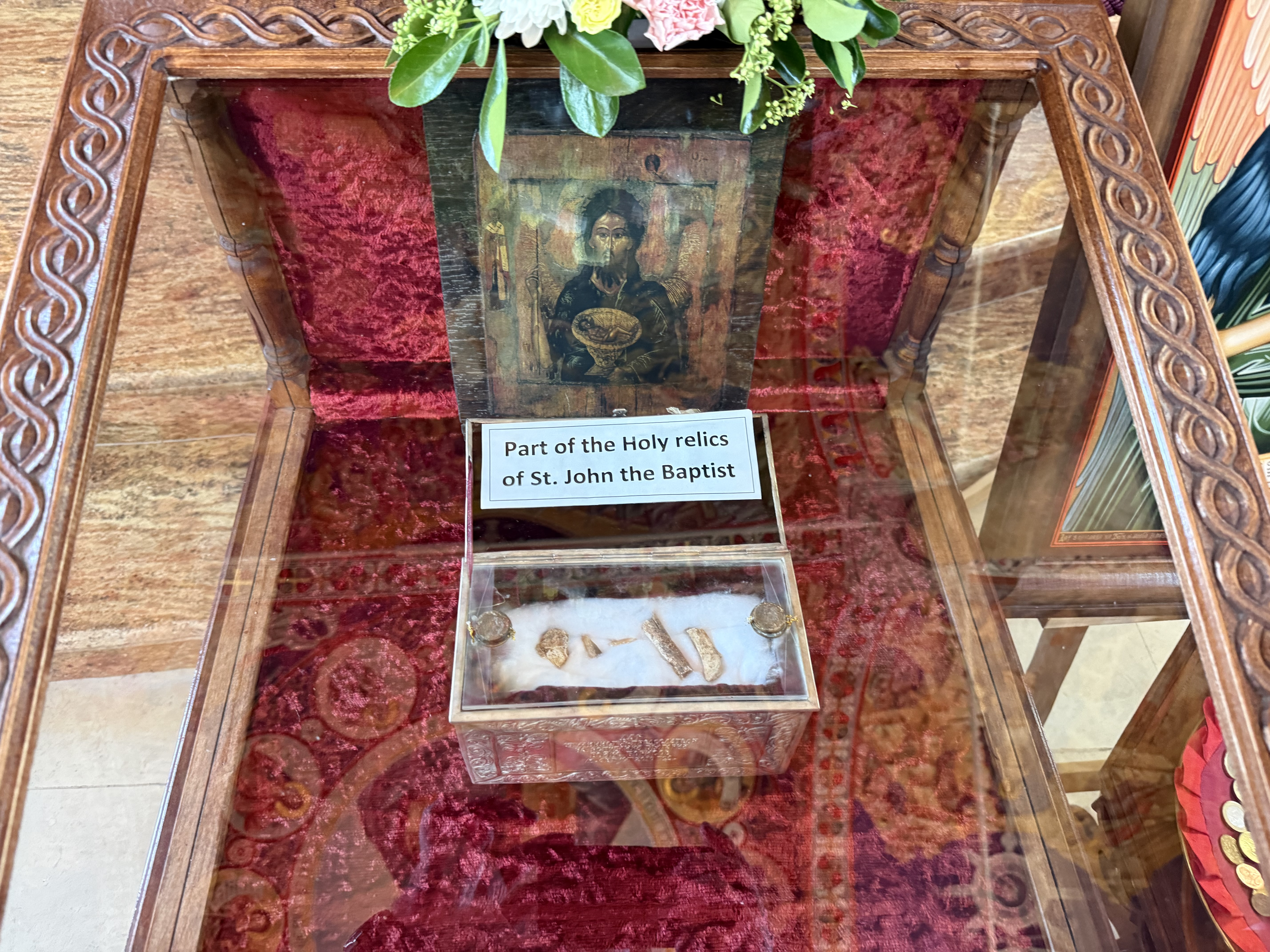
Remains kept in the Sts. Cyril and Methodius Cathedral in Sozopol, Bulgaria

In 2010, bones were discovered in the ruins of a Bulgarian church in the St. John the Forerunner Monastery (4th–17th centuries) on the Black Sea island of Sveti Ivan (St. John Island). Two years later, DNA and radio carbon testing showed the bones probably belonged to a Middle Eastern man who lived in the first century AD, and media reports said the remains could conceivably have belonged to John the Baptist, but there was no evidence to confirm or deny such speculation. The remains, found in a reliquary, were kept in the Sts. Cyril and Methodius Cathedral in Sozopol as of 2022.

==== Egypt ====
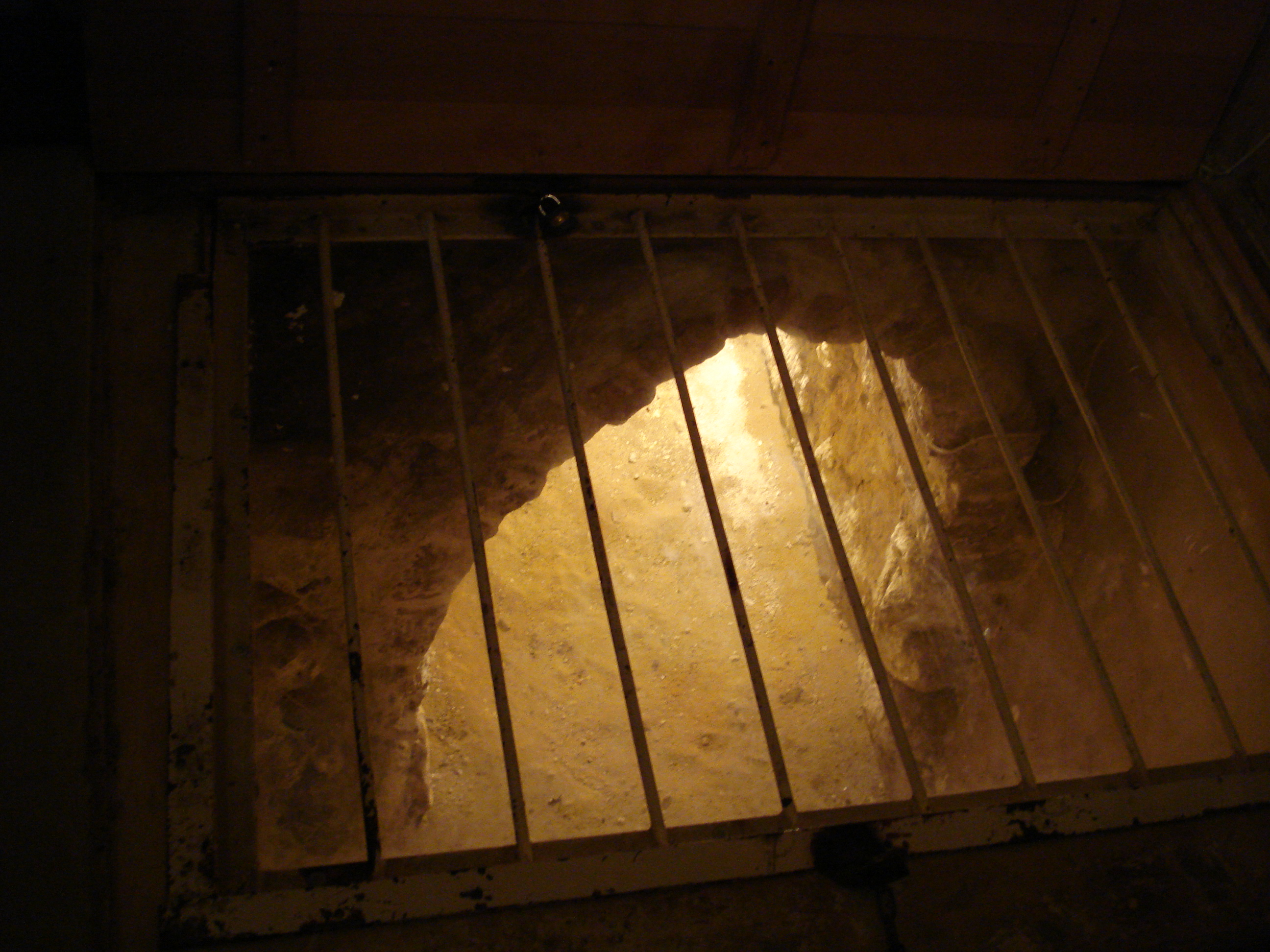
Tomb of Saint John the Baptist at a Coptic monastery in Lower Egypt. The bones of Saint John the Baptist were said to have been found here.

The Coptic Orthodox Church also have claimed to hold the relics of Saint John the Baptist. A crypt and relics said to be John's and mentioned in eleventh- and sixteenth-century manuscripts, were discovered in 1969 during restoration of the Church of St. Macarius at the Monastery of Saint Macarius the Great in Scetes, Egypt.

==== Nagorno-Karabakh ====
Additional relics are claimed to reside in Gandzasar Monastery's Cathedral of St. John the Baptist, in Nagorno-Karabakh.

==== Purported left finger bone ====
The bone of one of John the Baptist's left fingers is said to be at the Nelson-Atkins Museum of Art in Kansas City, Missouri. It is held in a Gothic-style monstrance made of gilded silver that dates back to fourteenth-century Lower Saxony.

==== Halifax, England ====
Another obscure claim relates to the town of Halifax in West Yorkshire, United Kingdom, where, as patron saint of the town, John the Baptist's head appears on the official coat-of-arms. One legend (among others) bases the etymology of the town's place-name on "halig" (holy) and "fax" (hair), claiming that a relic of the head, or face, of John the Baptist once existed in the town.

== Religious views ==
=== Christianity ===
The Gospels describe John the Baptist as having a specific role ordained by God as forerunner or precursor of Jesus, who was the foretold Messiah. The New Testament Gospels speak of this role. In Luke 1:17 the role of John is referred to as being "to turn the hearts of the fathers to the children, and the disobedient to the wisdom of the just; to make ready a people prepared for the Lord." In Luke 1:76 as "thou shalt go before the face of the Lord to prepare his ways" and in Luke 1:77 as being "To give knowledge of salvation unto his people by the remission of their sins."

There are several passages within the Old Testament which are interpreted by Christians as being prophetic of John the Baptist in this role. These include a passage in the Book of Malachi that refers to a prophet who would "prepare the way of the Lord":

Behold, I will send my messenger, and he shall prepare the way before me: and the Lord, whom ye seek, shall suddenly come to his temple, even the messenger of the covenant, whom ye delight in: behold, he shall come, saith the LORD of hosts.

— Malachi 3:1

Also at the end of the next chapter in Malachi 4:5–6 it says:

Behold, I will send you Elijah the prophet before the coming of the great and dreadful day of the LORD: And he shall turn the heart of the fathers to the children, and the heart of the children to their fathers, lest I come and smite the earth with a curse.

The Jews of Jesus' day expected Elijah to come before the Messiah; some present day Jews continue to await Elijah's coming as well, as in the Cup of Elijah the Prophet in the Passover Seder. This is why the disciples ask Jesus in Matthew 17:10, "Why then say the scribes that Elias must first come?"The disciples are then told by Jesus that Elijah came in the person of John the Baptist:

Jesus replied, "To be sure, Elijah comes and will restore all things. But I tell you, Elijah has already come, and they did not recognize him, but have done to him everything they wished. In the same way the Son of Man is going to suffer at their hands." Then the disciples understood that he was talking to them about John the Baptist.

— Matthew 17:11–13 (see also 11:14: "...if you are willing to accept it, he is Elijah who was to come.")

These passages are applied to John in the Synoptic Gospels. But where Matthew specifically identifies John the Baptist as Elijah's spiritual successor, the gospels of Mark and Luke are silent on the matter. The Gospel of John states that John the Baptist denied that he was Elijah:

Now this was John's testimony when the Jews of Jerusalem sent priests and Levites to ask him who he was. He did not deny, but confessed freely, "I am not the Christ." They asked him, "Then who are you? Are you Elijah?" He said, "I am not." "Are you the Prophet?" He answered, "No."

— John 1:19–21

==== Influence on Paul ====
Many scholars believe there was contact between the early church in the Apostolic Age and what is called the "Qumran-Essene community". The Dead Sea Scrolls were found at Qumran, which the majority of historians and archaeologists identify as an Essene settlement. John the Baptist is thought to have been either an Essene or "associated" with the community at Khirbet Qumran. According to the Book of Acts, Paul met some "disciples of John" in Ephesus.

==== Catholic Church ====
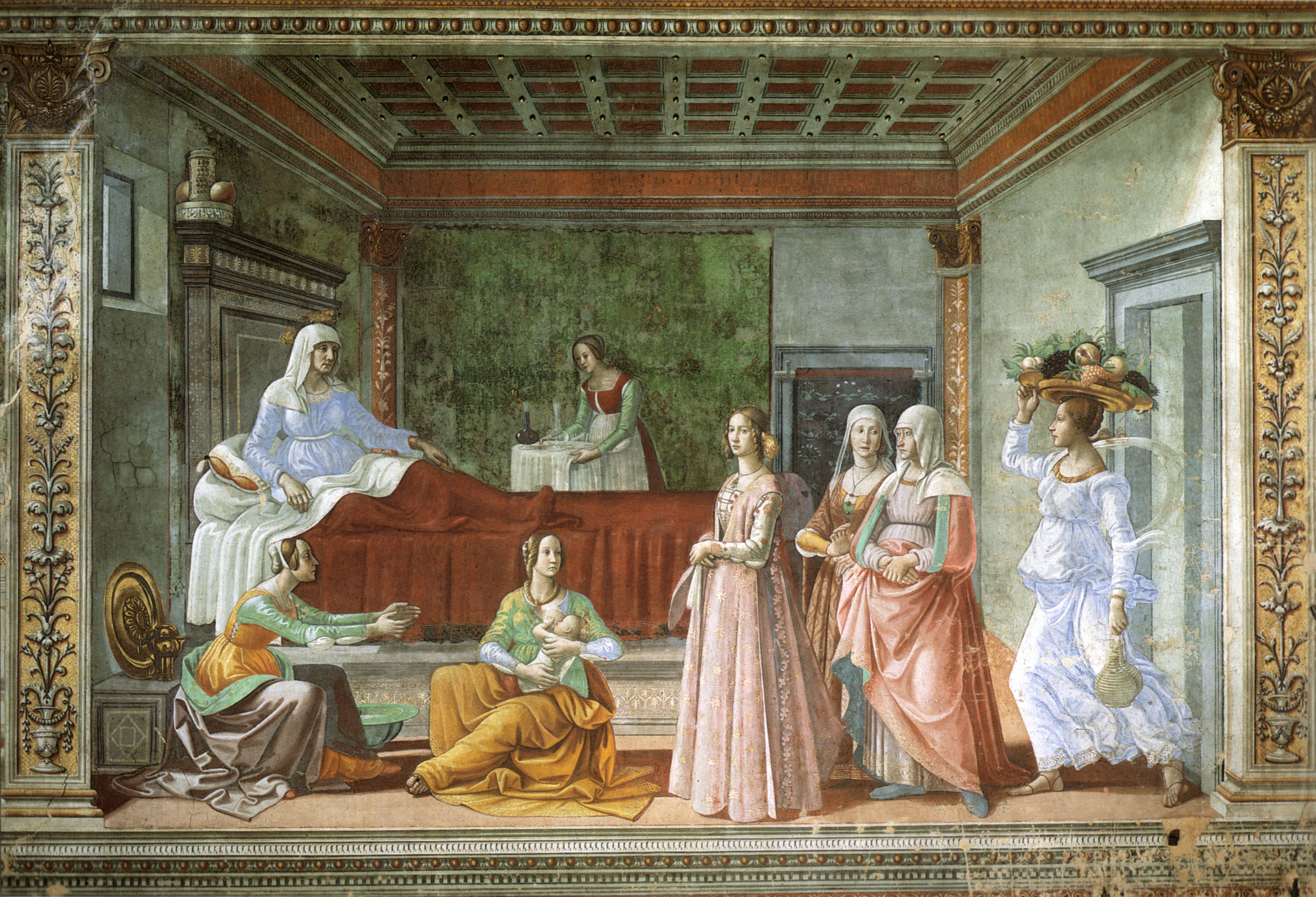
The Birth of John the Baptist, a fresco in the Tornabuoni Chapel in Florence

The Catholic Church commemorates Saint John the Baptist on two feast days:

- 24 June – Nativity of Saint John the Baptist
- 29 August – Beheading of Saint John the Baptist

According to Frederick Holweck, at the Visitation of the Blessed Virgin Mary to his mother Elizabeth, as recounted in Luke 1:39–57, John, sensing the presence of his Jesus, upon the arrival of Mary, leaped in the womb of his mother; he was then cleansed from original sin and filled with the grace of God. In her Treatise of Prayer, Saint Catherine of Siena includes a brief altercation with the Devil regarding her fight due to the Devil attempting to lure her with vanity and flattery. Speaking in the first person, Catherine responds to the Devil with the following words:

[...] humiliation of yourself, and you answered the Devil with these words: "Wretch that I am! John the Baptist never sinned and was sanctified in his mother's womb. And I have committed so many sins [...]"

— Catherine of Siena, A Treatise of Prayer, 1370.

==== Eastern Christianity ====
The Eastern Catholic Churches and Eastern Orthodox faith believe that John was the last of the Old Testament prophets, thus serving as a bridge between that period of revelation and the New Covenant. They also teach that, following his death, John descended into Hades and there once more preached that Jesus the Messiah was coming, so he was the Forerunner of Christ in death as he had been in life. Eastern Catholic and Orthodox churches will often have an icon of Saint John the Baptist in a place of honour on the iconostasis, and he is frequently mentioned during the Divine Services. Every Tuesday throughout the year is dedicated to his memory.

The Eastern Orthodox Church remembers Saint John the Forerunner on six separate feast days, listed here in order in which they occur during the church year (which begins on 1 September):

- 23 September – Conception of the Honorable Glorious Prophet, Forerunner and Baptist John
- 12 October – Translation from Malta to Gatchina: of a Particle of the Life Giving Cross, the Filersk Icon of the Mother of God, and the relic of the Right Hand of John the Baptist
- 7 January – Synaxis of the Holy Glorious Prophet, Forerunner and Baptist John. This is John the Baptist's main feast day, immediately after Theophany on 6 January (7 January also commemorates the transfer of the relic of the right hand of John the Baptist from Antioch to Constantinople in 956)

20 January In the Serbian Orthodox Church, the feast day of Saint John the Baptist is called "Jovanjdan" and is celebrated on 20 January (according to the Gregorian calendar). Key points about Jovanjdan: Name: "Jovanjdan" directly translates to "John's Day" in Serbian. Significance: This is a major feast day for Serbian Orthodox Christians, often considered a family "Slava" (patron saint day) where families celebrate with a special feast. Calendar note: While the Gregorian calendar date is 20 January, the Serbian Orthodox Church uses the Julian calendar, which can result in a slightly different date.

- 24 February – First and second finding of the Honorable Head of the Holy Glorious Prophet, Forerunner, and Baptist of the Lord, John
- 25 May – Third Finding of the Honorable Head of the Holy Glorious Prophet, Forerunner and Baptist John
- 24 June – Nativity of Saint John the Forerunner
- 29 August – The Beheading of Saint John the Forerunner, a day of strict fast and abstinence from meat and dairy products and foods containing meat or dairy products.

In addition to the above, 5 September is the commemoration of Zacharias and Elizabeth, Saint John's parents.

The Russian Orthodox Church observes 12 October as the Transfer of the Right Hand of the Forerunner from Malta to Gatchina (1799).

==== Church of Jesus Christ of Latter-day Saints ====
The Church of Jesus Christ of Latter-day Saints teaches that modern revelation confirms the biblical account of John and also makes known additional events in his ministry. According to this belief, John was "ordained by the angel of God" when he was eight days old "to overthrow the kingdom of the Jews" and to prepare a people for the Lord. Latter-day Saints also believe that "he was baptized while yet in his childhood."

Joseph Smith said: "Let us come into New Testament times – so many are ever praising the Lord and His apostles. We will commence with John the Baptist. When Herod's edict went forth to destroy the young children, John was about six months older than Jesus, and came under this hellish edict, and Zecharias caused his mother to take him into the mountains, where he was raised on locusts and wild honey. When his father refused to disclose his hiding place, and being the officiating high priest at the Temple that year, was slain by Herod's order, between the porch and the altar, as Jesus said."

The Church of Jesus Christ of Latter-Day Saints teaches that John the Baptist appeared on the banks of the Susquehanna River near Harmony Township, Susquehanna County, Pennsylvania, as a resurrected being to Joseph Smith and Oliver Cowdery on 15 May 1829, and ordained them to the Aaronic priesthood. According to the Church's dispensational view of religious history, John's ministry has operated in three dispensations: he was the last of the prophets under the law of Moses; he was the first of the New Testament prophets; and he was sent to restore the Aaronic priesthood in our day (the dispensation of the fulness of times). Latter-day Saints believe John's ministry was foretold by two prophets whose teachings are included in the Book of Mormon: Lehi and his son Nephi.

==== Unification Church ====
The Unification Church teaches that God intended John to help Jesus during his public ministry in Judea. In particular, John should have done everything in his power to persuade the Jewish people that Jesus was the Messiah. He was to become Jesus' main disciple and John's disciples were to become Jesus' disciples. Unfortunately, John did not follow Jesus and continued his own way of baptizing people. Moreover, John also denied that he was Elijah when queried by several Jewish leaders, contradicting Jesus who stated John is Elijah who was to come. Many Jews therefore could not accept Jesus as the Messiah because John denied being Elijah, as the prophet's appearance was a prerequisite for the Messiah's arrival as stated in Malachi 4:5. According to the Unification Church, "John the Baptist was in the position of representing Elijah's physical body, making himself identical with Elijah from the standpoint of their mission."

According to Matthew 11:11, Jesus stated "there has not risen one greater than John the Baptist." However, in referring to John's blocking the way of the Jews' understanding of him as the Messiah, Jesus said "yet he who is least in the kingdom of heaven is greater than he." John's failure to follow Jesus became the chief obstacle to the fulfilment of Jesus' mission.

==== Syrian-Egyptian Gnosticism ====
Among the early Judeo-Christian Gnostics the Ebionites held that John, along with Jesus and James the Just – all of whom they revered – were vegetarians. Epiphanius of Salamis records that this group had amended their Gospel of Matthew – known today as the Gospel of the Ebionites – to change where John eats "locusts" to read "honey cakes" or "manna".

=== Mandaeism ===
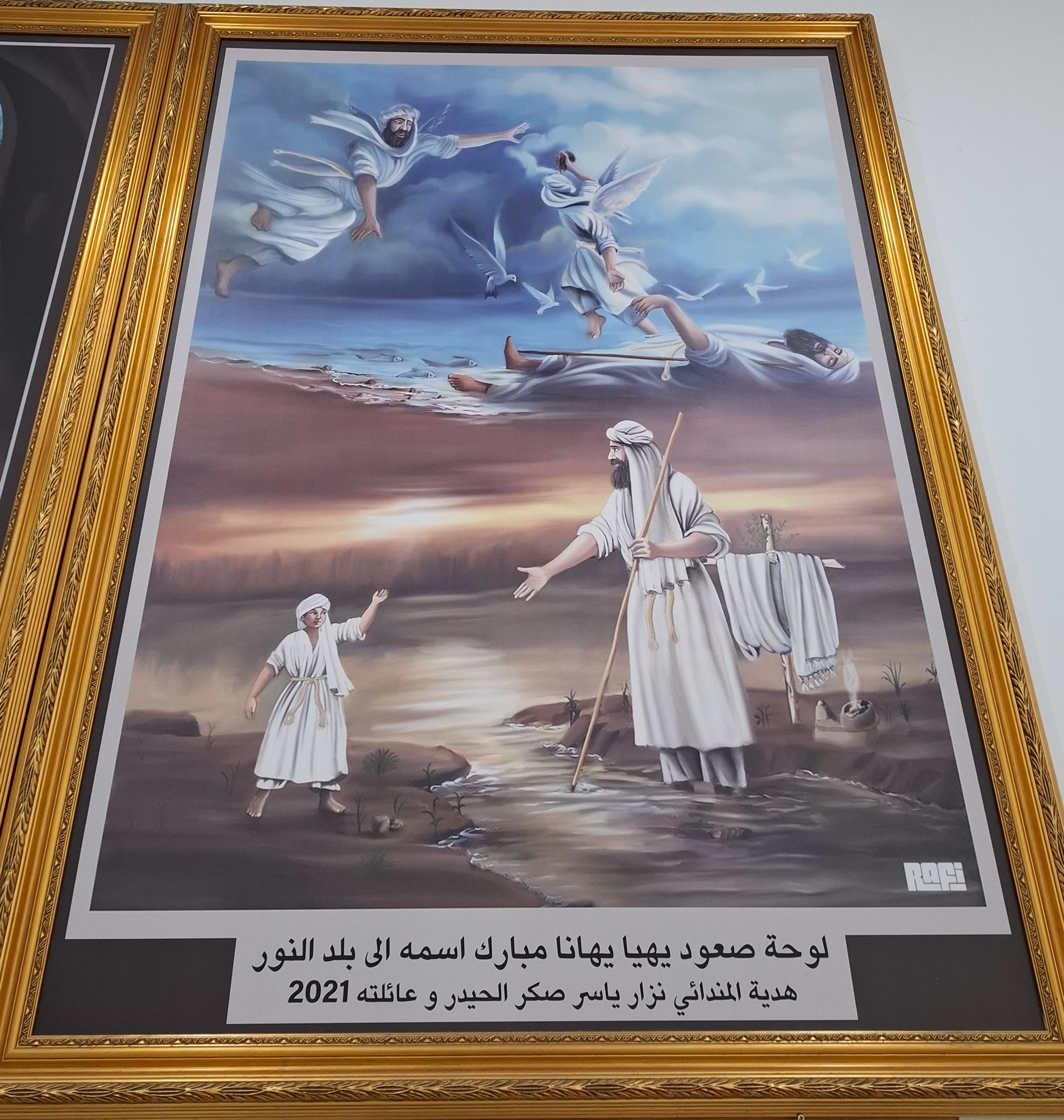
A painting at Yahya Yuhana Mandi depicting the ascension of Yahya Yuhana (John the Baptist) to the World of Light during his meeting with Manda d-Hayyi, who appears as a boy. The story is from Right Ginza Book 5, Chapter 4.

John the Baptist, or Yuhana Maṣbana (Classical Mandaic: ࡉࡅࡄࡀࡍࡀ ࡌࡀࡑࡁࡀࡍࡀ, lit. 'John the Baptizer' Iuhana Maṣbana) is considered the greatest prophet of the Mandaeans. Mandaeans also refer to him as Yuhana bar Zakria (John, son of Zechariah). He plays a large part in their religious texts such as the Ginza Rabba and the Mandaean Book of John. Mandaeans believe that they descend directly from John's original disciples but they do not believe that their religion began with John, tracing their beliefs back to their first prophet Adam. According to Mandaeism, John was a great teacher, a Nasoraean and renewer of the faith. John is a messenger of Light (nhura) and Truth (kushta) who possessed the power of healing and full Gnosis (manda). Mandaean texts make it abundantly clear that early Mandaeans were extremely loyal to John and viewed him as a prophetic reformer of the ancient Mandaean/Israelite tradition. Scholars such as Rudolf Macúch, E. S. Drower, Jorunn J. Buckley, and Şinasi Gündüz believe that the Mandaeans likely have a historical connection with John's original disciples. Mandaeans believe that John was married, with his wife named Anhar, and had children.

Enišbai (Elizabeth) is mentioned as the mother of John the Baptist in chapters 18, 21, and 32 of the Mandaean Book of John.

=== Islam ===
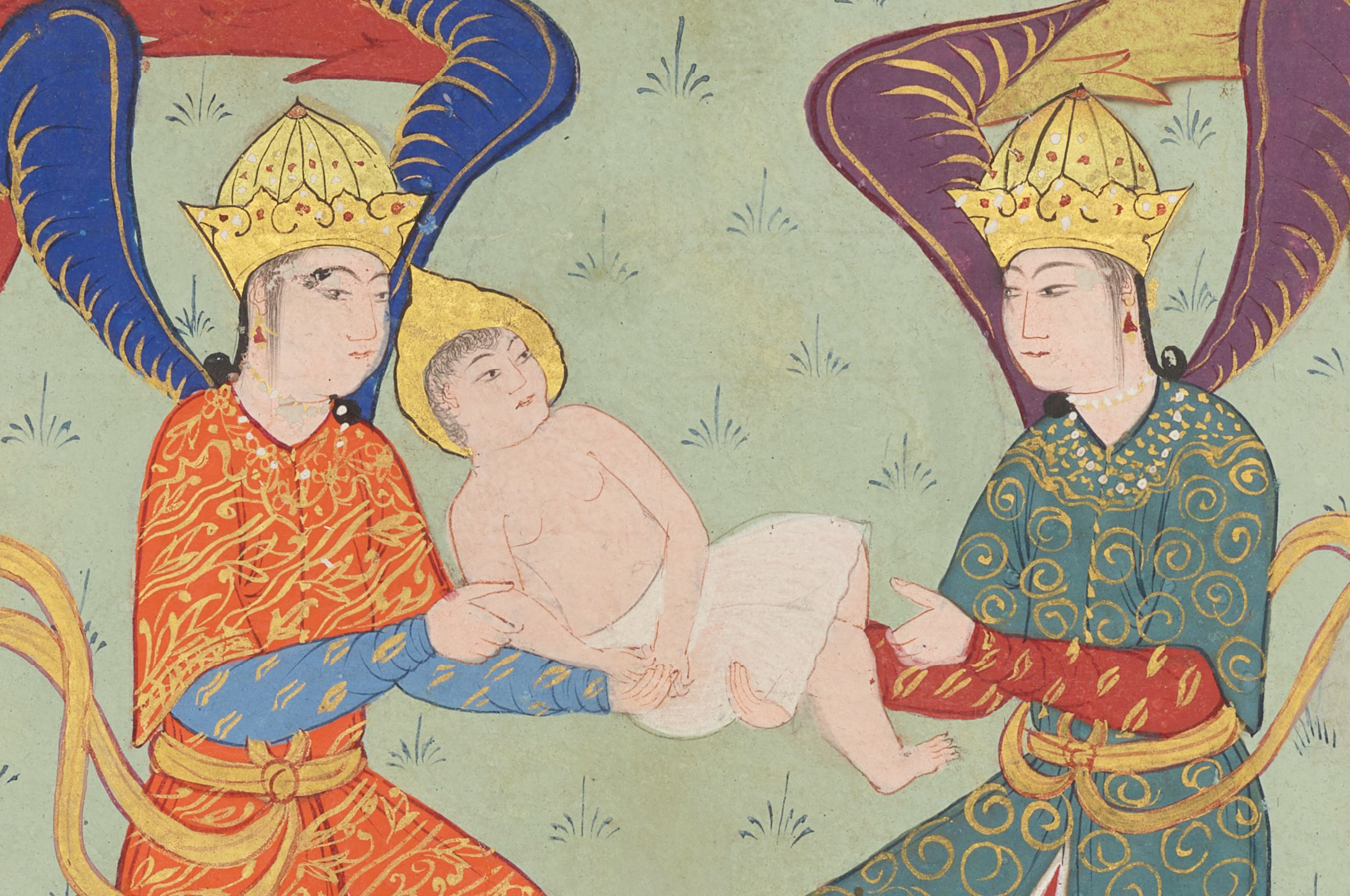
Illustration of a 1585–1590 Ottoman manuscript depicting baby Yahya being held by two angels

In Islam, John the Baptist is known as Yaḥyā ibn Zakariyā (Arabic: يحيى بن زكريا) and considered the maternal cousin of Jesus as well as a prophet. He is also believed by Muslims to have been a witness to the word of God who would herald the coming of Jesus. His father Zechariah was also an Islamic prophet. Islamic tradition maintains that John met Muhammad on the night of the Mi'raj, along with Jesus in the second heaven. John's story was also told to the Abyssinian king during the Muslim refugees' Migration to Abyssinia. According to the Quran, John was one on whom God sent peace on the day that he was born and the day that he died. His cenotaph is a major pilgrimage site for Muslims in the Umayyad Mosque in Damascus.

==== Quranic mentions ====
The Quran claims that John the Baptist was the first to receive this name (Quran 19:7-10) but since the name Yoḥanan occurs many times before John the Baptist, this verse is referring either to Islamic scholar consensus that "Yaḥyā" is not the same name as "Yoḥanan" or to the Biblical account of the miraculous naming of John, which accounted that he was almost named "Zacharias" (Greek: Ζαχαρίας) after his father's name, as no one in the lineage of his father Zacharias (also known as Zechariah) had been named "John" ("Yohanan"/"Yoannes") before him.

In the Quran, God frequently mentions Zechariah's continuous praying for the birth of a son. Zechariah's wife, mentioned in the New Testament as Elizabeth (Arabic: إيشاع) was barren and therefore the birth of a child seemed impossible. As a gift from God, Zechariah (Arabic: زكريَا) was given a son by the name of "Yaḥya" or "John", a name specially chosen for this child alone. In accordance with Zechariah's prayer, God made John and Jesus, who according to exegesis was born six months later, renew the message of God, which had been corrupted and lost by the Israelites. The Quran says:

˹The angels announced,˺ "O Zachariah! Indeed, We give you the good news of ˹the birth of˺ a son, whose name will be John—a name We have not given to anyone before."
He wondered, "My Lord! How can I have a son when my wife is barren, and I have become extremely old?"
An angel replied, "So will it be! Your Lord says, 'It is easy for Me, just as I created you before, when you were nothing!'"
Zachariah said, "My Lord! Grant me a sign." He responded, "Your sign is that you will not ˹be able to˺ speak to people for three nights, despite being healthy."

— Surah Maryam 19:7-10

According to the Quran, John was exhorted to hold fast to scripture and was given wisdom by God while still a child. He was pure and devout, and walked well in the presence of God. He was dutiful towards his parents and he was not arrogant or rebellious. John's reading and understanding of the scriptures, when only a child, surpassed even that of the greatest scholars of the time. Muslim exegesis narrates that Jesus sent John out with twelve disciples, who preached the message before Jesus called his own disciples. The Quran says:

˹It was later said,˺ "O John! Hold firmly to the Scriptures." And We granted him wisdom while ˹he was still˺ a child,

— Surah Maryam 19:12

John was a classical prophet, who was exalted high by God for his bold denouncing of all things sinful. Furthermore, the Quran speaks of John's gentle piety and love and his humble attitude towards life, for which he was granted the Purity of Life:

as well as purity and compassion from Us. And he was God-fearing,
and kind to his parents. He was neither arrogant nor disobedient.
Peace be upon him the day he was born, and the day of his death, and the day he will be raised back to life.

— Surah Maryam 19:13-15

John is also honoured highly in Sufism, primarily because of the Quran's description of John's chastity and kindness. Sufis have frequently applied commentaries on the passages on John in the Quran, primarily concerning the God-given gift of "Wisdom" which he acquired in youth as well as his parallels with Jesus. Although several phrases used to describe John and Jesus are virtually identical in the Quran, the manner in which they are expressed is different.

=== Druze view ===
Druze tradition honours several "mentors" and "prophets", and John the Baptist is honoured as a prophet. Druze venerate John the Baptist and he is considered a central figure in Druzism. Druze, like some Christians, believe that Elijah (al-Khidr) came back as John the Baptist, since they believe in reincarnation and the transmigration of the soul.

=== Baháʼí view ===
The Baháʼí Faith considers John to have been a prophet of God who like all other prophets was sent to instill the knowledge of God, promote unity among the people of the world, and to show people the correct way to live. There are numerous quotations in the writings of Bahá'u'lláh, founder of the Baháʼí Faith, mentioning John the Baptist. He is regarded by Baháʼís as a lesser Prophet. Bahá'u'lláh claimed that his forerunner, the Báb, was the spiritual return of John the Baptist. In his letter to Pope Pius IX, Bahá'u'lláh wrote:

O followers of the Son! We have once again sent John unto you, and He, verily, hath cried out in the wilderness of the Bayán: O peoples of the world! Cleanse your eyes! The Day whereon ye can behold the Promised One and attain unto Him hath drawn nigh! O followers of the Gospel! Prepare the way! The Day of the advent of the Glorious Lord is at hand! Make ready to enter the Kingdom. Thus hath it been ordained by God, He Who causeth the dawn to break.

John is believed to have had the specific role of foretelling and preparing the way for Jesus. In condemning those who had 'turned aside' from him, Bahá'u'lláh compared them to the followers of John the Baptist, who, he said, "protested against Him Who was the Spirit (Jesus) saying: 'The dispensation of John hath not yet ended; wherefore hast thou come?'" Bahá'u'lláh believed that the Báb played the same role as John in preparing the people for his own coming. As such, Bahá'u'lláh refers to the Báb as 'My Forerunner', the Forerunner being a title that Christians reserve for John the Baptist. However, Baháʼís consider the Báb to be a greater Prophet (Manifestation of God) and thus possessed of a far greater station than John the Baptist.

== Scholarship ==
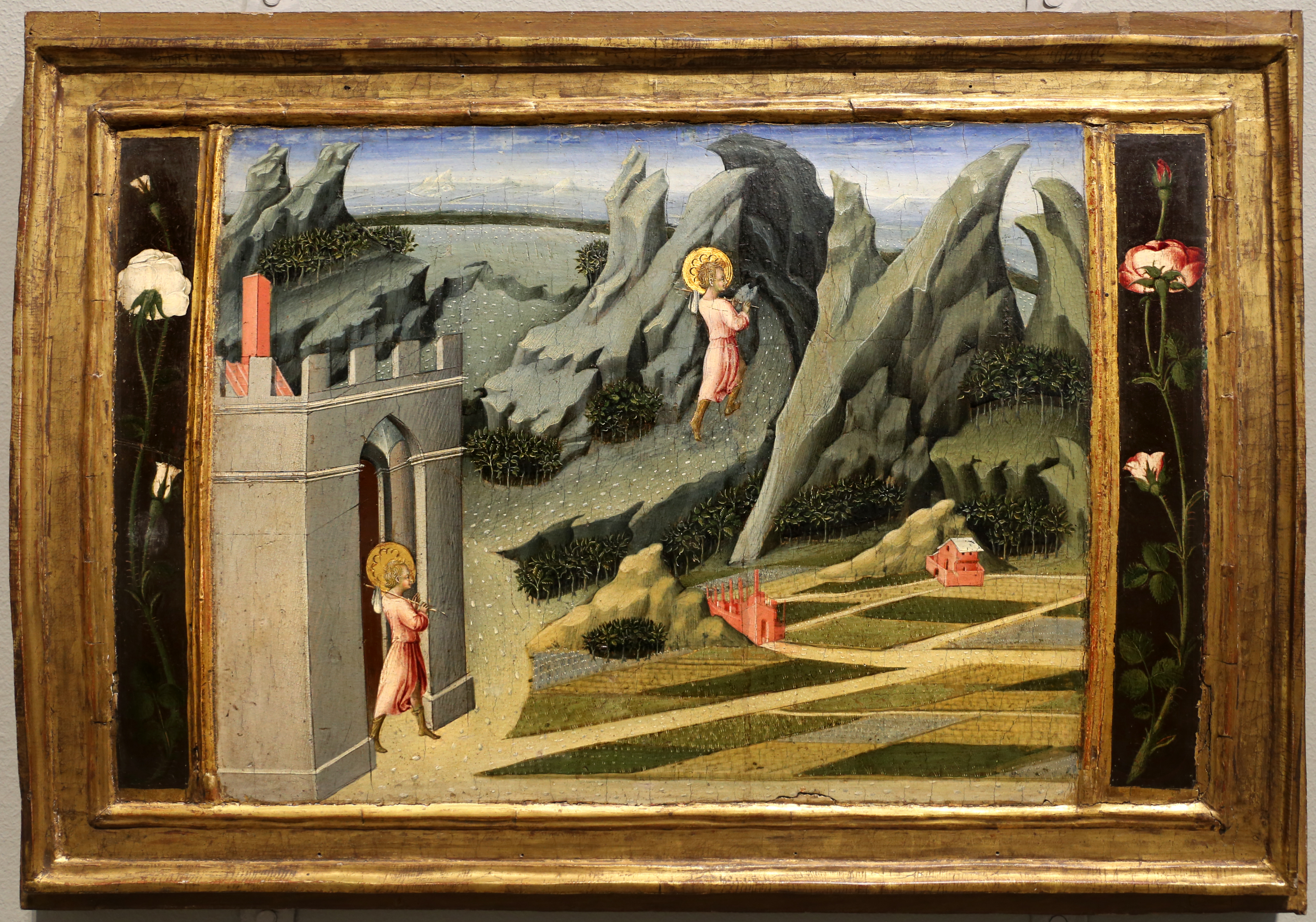
John the Baptist setting off into the desert, by Giovanni di Paolo, 1454

Scholars studying John the Baptist's relationship with Jesus of Nazareth have commented on the differences in their respective approaches.

James F. McGrath writes "In the first half of the twentieth century, the Mandaeans received significant attention from New Testament scholars who thought that their high view of John the Baptist might mean they were the descendants of his disciples. Many historians think that Jesus of Nazareth was a disciple of John the Baptist before breaking away to form his own movement, and I am inclined to agree."

L. Michael White says John the Baptist should be thought of "...primarily as one who was calling for a return to an intensely Jewish piety [...] to follow the way of the Lord [...] to make oneself pure... to be right with God [...] And it seems to be that he calls for baptism as a sign of rededication or repurification of life in a typically Jewish way before God."

John Dominic Crossan sees John the Baptist as an apocalyptic eschatologist predicting that "God, very soon, imminently, any moment, is going to descend to eradicate the evil of this world in a sort of an apocalyptic consummation..." When Jesus says John is the greatest person ever born on earth, but the least in the Kingdom of God is greater than John, it means that Jesus is changing his vision of God and the Kingdom of God from what he has taken from John. For Crossan, Jesus is an ethical eschatologist who sees "...the demand that God is making on us, not us on God so much as God on us, to do something about the evil in the world."

Michael H. Crosby states that there is "no biblical evidence indicating that John the Baptist ever became a disciple of Jesus". He believes that John's concept of what a messiah should be stood in contrast to how Jesus presented himself, and kept him from becoming a disciple of Jesus. Crosby states that "an unbiased reading leaves us with the figure of John the Baptist as a reformist Jew who also may have wanted desperately to become a believer but was unable to become convinced of Jesus' messiahship..." Crosby considers John's effectiveness as a "precursor" in encouraging others to follow Jesus as very minimal, since the scriptures record only two of his own followers having become Jesus' disciples. Charles Croll points out that five of John's disciples immediately followed Jesus, four of whom became apostles, one third of the twelve.

Professor Candida Moss states that the followers of John and those of Jesus became "de facto competitors in the ancient religious marketplace". After baptizing Jesus, John did not follow Jesus but maintained a separate ministry. After John's death, Jesus' followers had to differentiate him from the executed prophet, "countering the prevalent idea that Jesus was actually John raised from the dead". Moss also references the incident in Matthew 16 where disciples indicated that some people believed that Jesus was John the Baptist.

Pastor Robert L. Deffinbaugh views John's sending two of his disciples to ask Jesus if he were the Messiah or whether another should be sought as the Baptist's issuing a public challenge — since the message was presented to Jesus while he was with a gathered crowd. Deffinbaugh suggests that John might have been looking for inauguration of the kingdom of God in a more dramatic way than what Jesus was presenting, as John had previously warned that the "Messiah would come with fire". Jesus answered by indicating his miracle works and teachings which themselves gave evidence of his identity: "The blind receive sight, the lame walk, those who have leprosy are cured, the deaf hear, the dead are raised, and the good news is preached to the poor". Charles Croll counters this view, suggesting that John had realized that his time of preparing the way was over and that he was saying to Jesus that he now had to testify, himself, that he was the Coming One. Jesus' affirmative yet indirect response was two-fold, first by pointing out that he was doing the work expected of the Messiah, referencing his commissioning text in Isaiah. Secondly, he affirmed John's ministry and message by identifying him as the unshakeable prophet of Malachi 3:1, who was among the greatest people who have ever lived and was not one to bend in the wind (Luke 7:18–35).

Harold W. Attridge agrees with Crossan in classifying John as an apocalyptic preacher. Attridge states that most contemporary scholars would see the idea of John as the "forerunner" of Jesus as a construct developed by the early church to help explain the relationship between the two: "For the early church it would have been something of an embarrassment to say that Jesus, who was in their minds superior to John the Baptist, had been baptized by him, and thereby proclaimed some sort of subordination to him, some sort of disciple relationship to him..."

Barbara Thiering questions the dating of the Dead Sea Scrolls and notes that the Teacher of Righteousness (a prominent figure for the Essenes) preached coming fiery judgement, said "the axe is laid to the roots of the tree", called people "vipers", practised baptism and lived in the wilderness of Judea. Due to these reasons, she believes there is a strong possibility for identifying the Teacher of Righteousness with John the Baptist. Charles Croll writes that the similarities are very superficial and there are many substantial differences between John the Baptist and the Qumran sect.

== In art ==
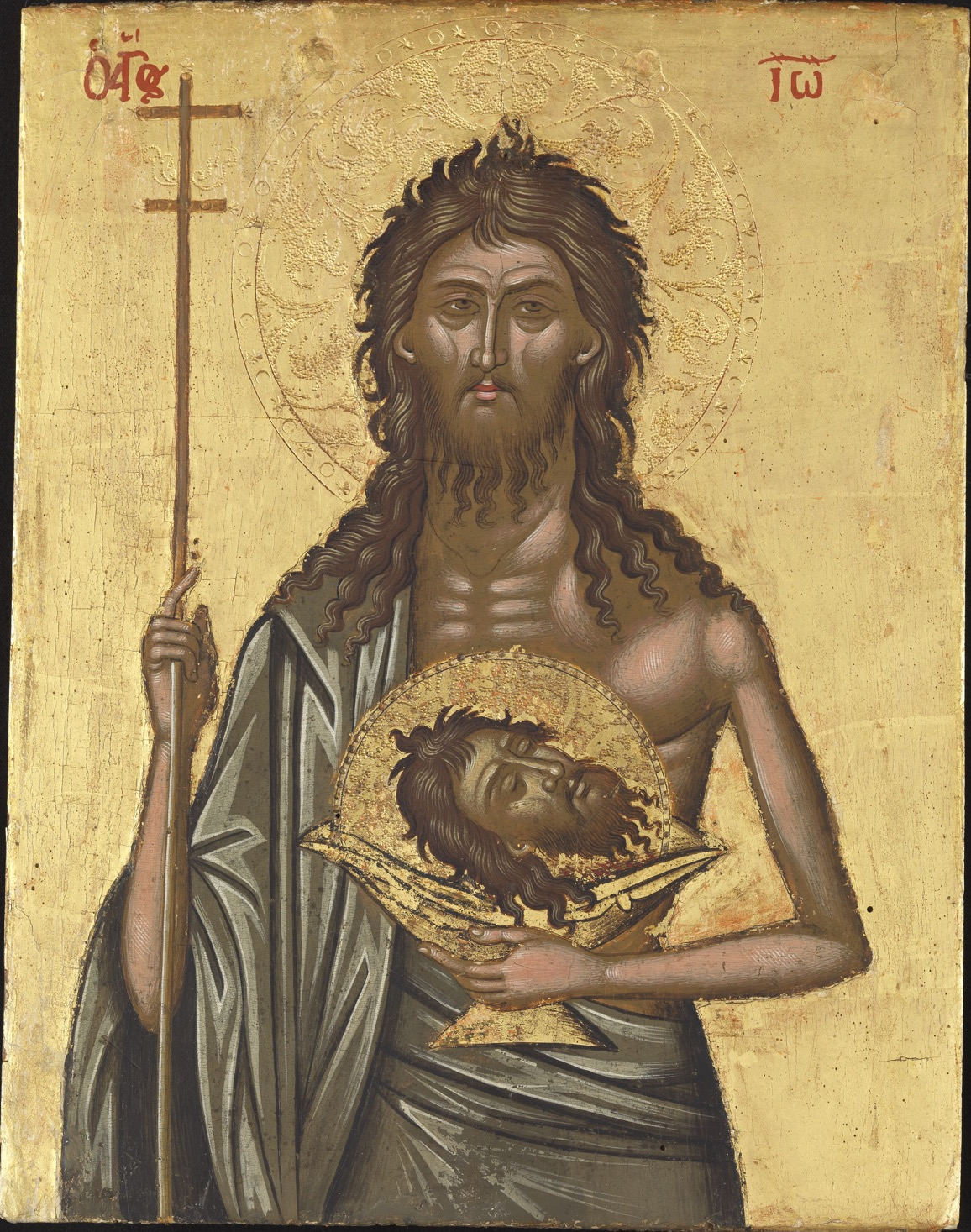
Eastern Orthodox icon of St. John the Baptist, painted by Emmanuel Tzanes in the 17th century

=== Early Christian art ===
The earliest depictions of St John are found in the Baptism of Christ, one of the earliest scenes from the Life of Christ to be frequently depicted in Early Christian art, and John's tall, thin, even gaunt, and bearded figure is already established by the fifth century. Only he and Jesus are consistently shown with long hair from Early Christian times, when the apostles generally have trim classical cuts; in fact John is more consistently depicted in this way than Jesus.

=== Byzantine and Eastern Orthodox art ===
In Byzantine and later Eastern Orthodox art, John the Baptist and the Holy Virgin Mary often flank Jesus on either side. The composition of the Deesis came to be included in every Eastern Orthodox church, as remains the case to this day. Here John and the Theotokos (Mary the "God-bearer") flank a Christ Pantocrator and intercede for humanity.

In Eastern Orthodox icons, he often has angel's wings, since Mark 1:2 describes him as a messenger.

=== Western art ===
After the earliest images showing the Baptism of the Lord follow ones with St John shown as an ascetic wearing camel hair, with a staff and scroll inscribed (in Western art) "Ecce Agnus Dei", or bearing a book or dish with a lamb on it.

The Baptist is very often shown on altarpieces designed for churches dedicated to him, where the donor was named for him or where there was some other patronage connection. John the Baptist is the patron saint of Florence and has often been depicted in the art of that city, and also frequently appears in baptistries, which are very often dedicated to him. Major works depicting St John the Baptist can be found in the Florence Baptistery, including the mosaics on the vault, the bronze doors by Andrea Pisano, and the great silver altar now in the Museo dell'Opera del Duomo.

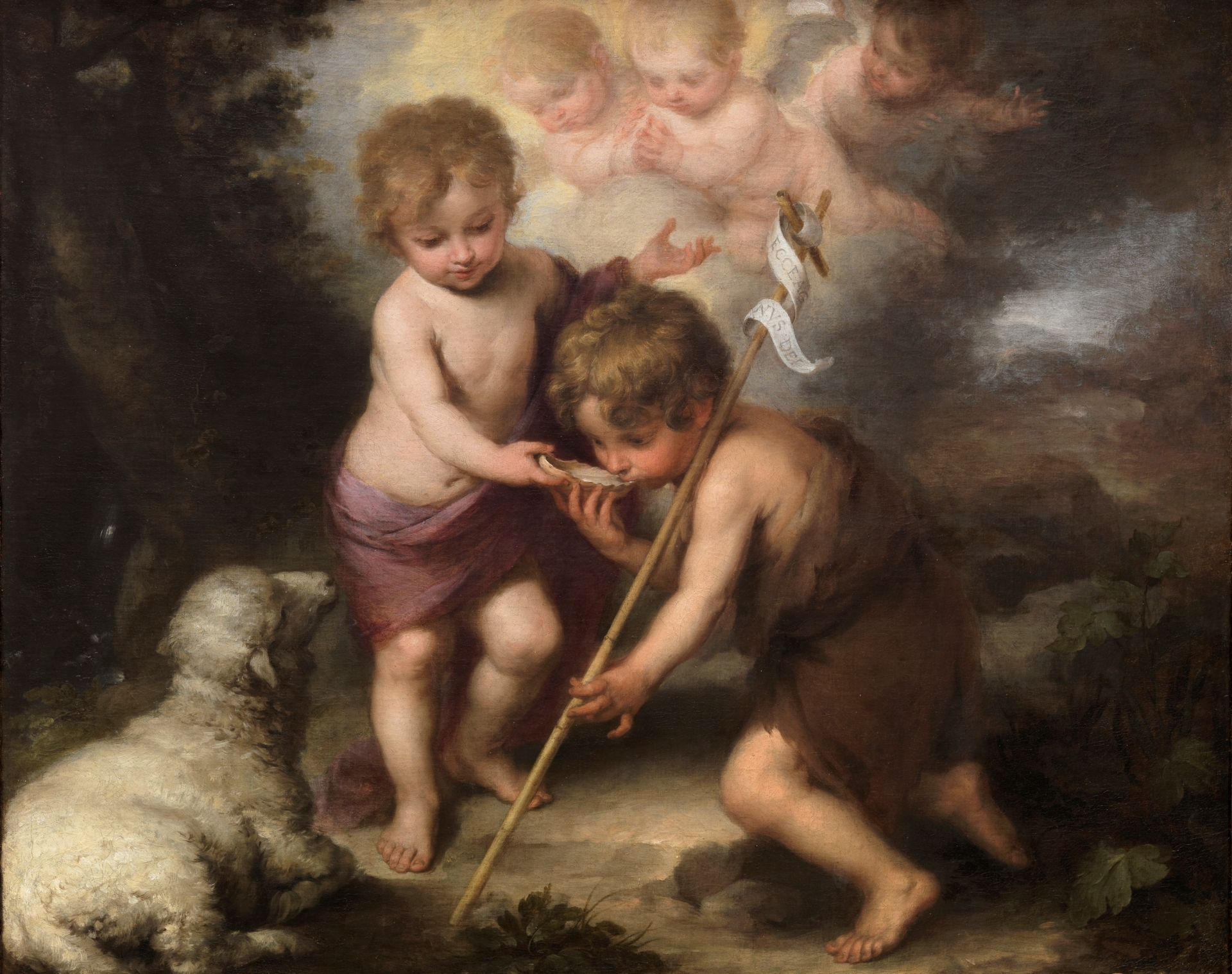
John the Baptist (right) with the Christ Child, in The Holy Children with a Shell by Bartolomé Esteban Murillo

A number of narrative scenes from his life were often shown on the predella of altarpieces dedicated to John, and other settings, notably in the frescoes by Giotto for the Peruzzi Chapel in the church of Santa Croce, the large series in grisaille fresco in the Chiostro dello Scalzo, which was Andrea del Sarto's largest work, and the frescoed Life by Domenico Ghirlandaio in the Tornabuoni Chapel, all in Florence. There is another important fresco cycle by Filippo Lippi in Prato Cathedral. These include the typical scenes: the Annunciation to Zechariah; John's birth; his naming by his father; the Visitation; John's departure for the desert; his preaching in the desert; the Baptism of Christ; John before Herod; the dance of Herod's stepdaughter, Salome; his beheading; and the daughter of Herodias Salome carrying his head on a platter.

His birth, which unlike the Nativity of Jesus allowed a relatively wealthy domestic interior to be shown, became increasingly popular as a subject in the late Middle Ages, with depictions by Jan van Eyck in the Turin-Milan Hours and Ghirlandaio in the Tornabuoni Chapel being among the best known. His execution, a church feast-day, was often shown; by the fifteenth century, scenes such as the dance of Salome became popular; sometimes, as in an engraving by Israhel van Meckenem, the interest of the artist is clearly in showing the life of Herod's court, given contemporary dress, as much as the martyrdom of the saint. The execution was usually by a swordsman, with John kneeling in prayer, Salome often standing by with an empty platter, and Herod and Herodias at table in a cut-through view of a building in the background.

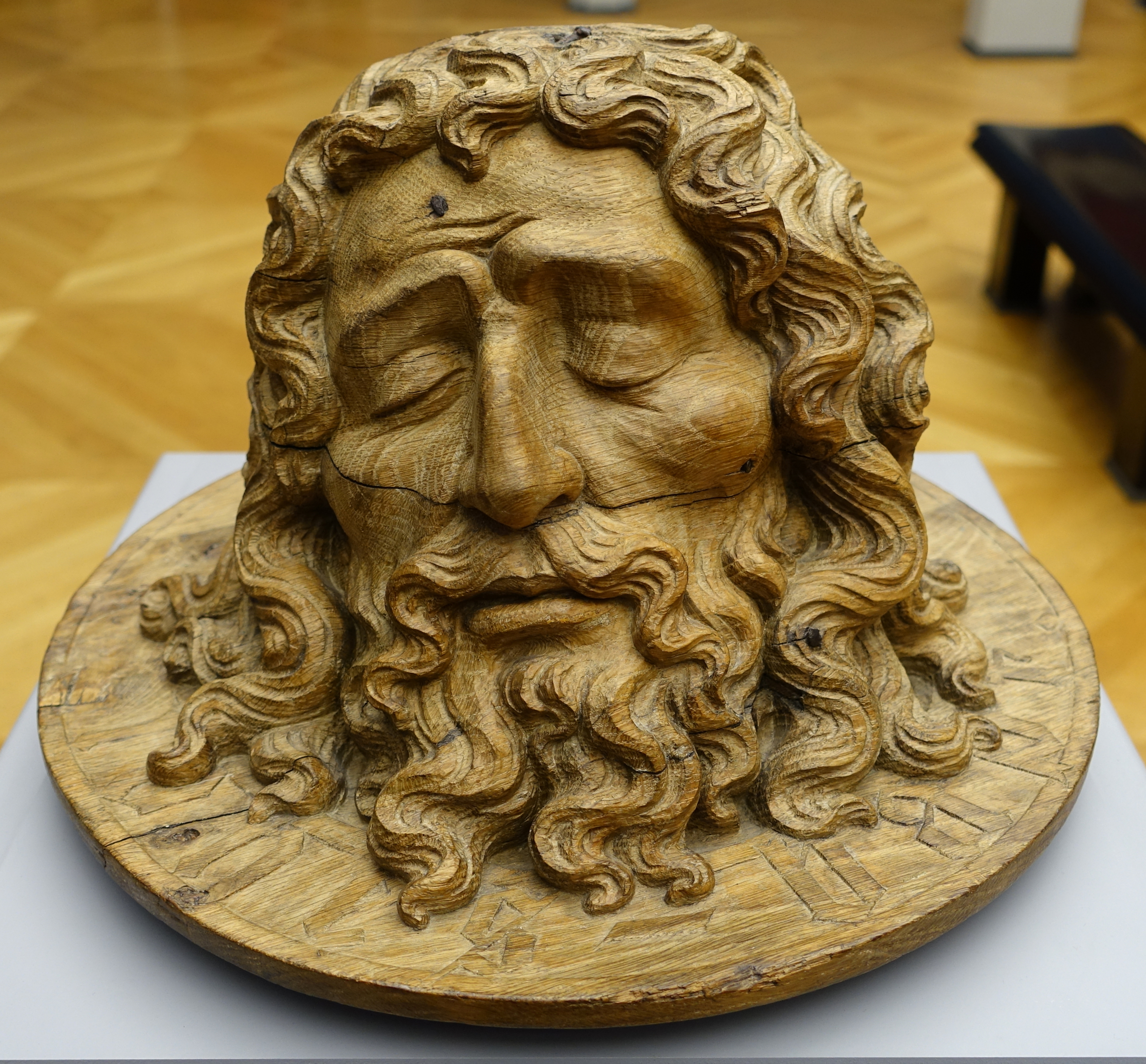
Head of St John the Baptist on a Plate, Southern Netherlands, c. 1430, oak

Salome bearing John's head on a platter equally became a subject for the Power of Women group: a Northern Renaissance fashion for images of glamorous but dangerous women (Delilah, Judith and others). It was often painted by Lucas Cranach the Elder and engraved by the Little Masters. When the head is brought to the table by Salome, Herod may be shown as startled, if not disgusted, but Herodias is usually not. These images remained popular into the Baroque, with Carlo Dolci painting at least three versions. John preaching, in a landscape setting, was a popular subject in Dutch art from Pieter Brueghel the Elder and his successors. The isolated motif of the severed head, often on its platter, was a frequent image, often in sculpture, from the late Middle Ages onwards, known as Ioannes in disco (Latin for "John on a plate").

As a child (of varying age), he is sometimes shown from the fifteenth century in family scenes from the life of Christ such as the Holy Family, the Presentation of Christ, the Marriage of the Virgin and the Holy Kinship. In the Baptism of Christ his presence was obligatory. Leonardo da Vinci's two versions of the Virgin of the Rocks were influential in establishing a Renaissance fashion for variations on the Madonna and Child which included John. Raphael in particular painted many compositions of the subject, such as the Alba Madonna, La belle jardinière, the Garvagh Madonna, the Madonna della seggiola, and the Madonna dell'Impannata, which are among his best-known works.

John was also often shown by himself as an adolescent or adult, usually already wearing his distinctive dress and carrying a long thin wooden cross – another theme influenced by Leonardo, whose equivocal composition, with the camel-skin dress, was developed by Raphael, Titian and Guido Reni among many others. Often he is accompanied by a lamb, especially in the many Early Netherlandish paintings which needed this attribute as he wore normal clothes, or a red robe over a not very clearly indicated camel skin. Caravaggio painted an especially large number of works depicting John, from at least five largely nude youths attributed to him, to three late works on his death – the great Execution in Malta, and two sombre Salomes with his head, one in Madrid, and one in London.

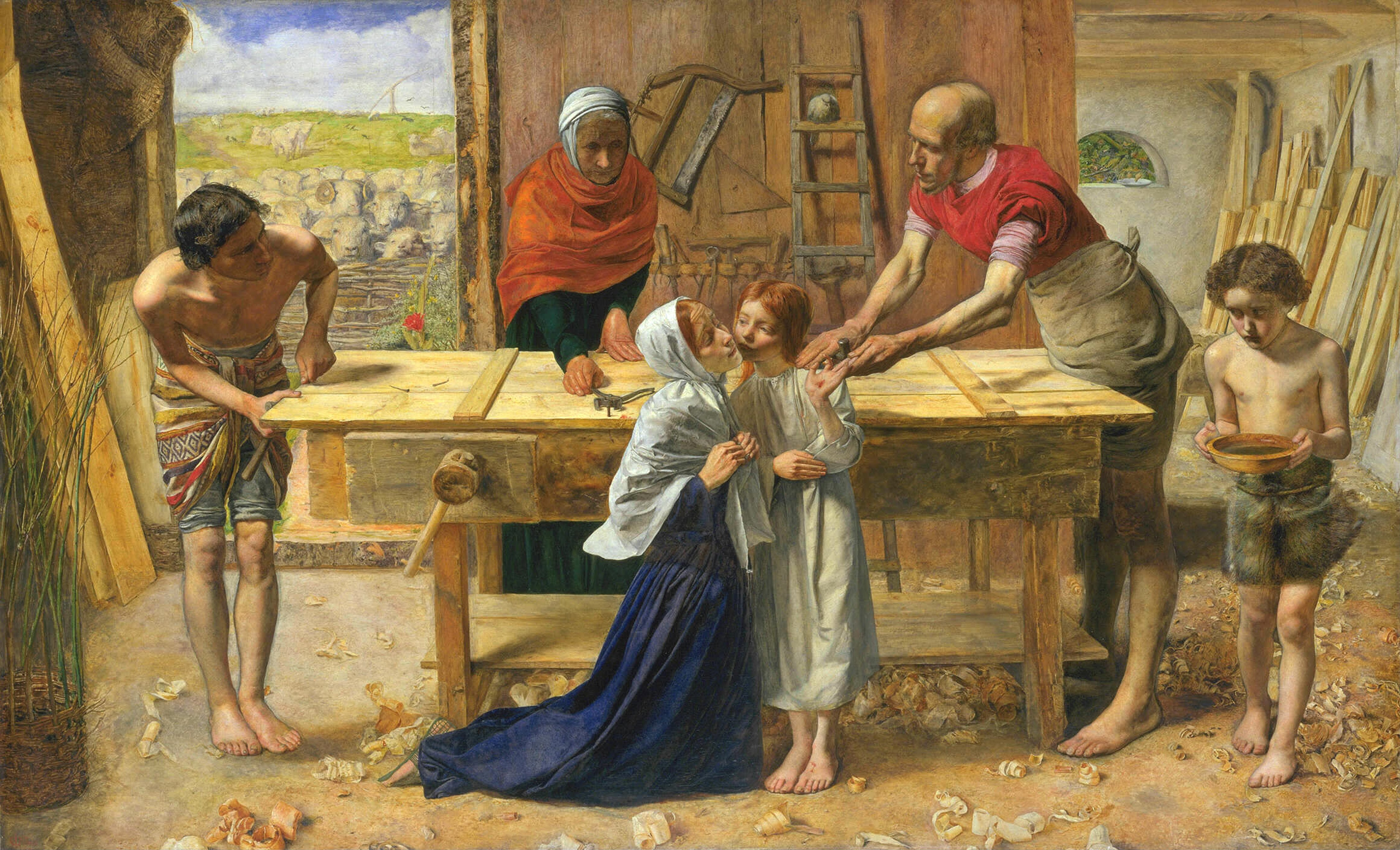
St John (right) in Christ in the House of His Parents by John Everett Millais, 1849–50

Amiens Cathedral, which holds one of the alleged heads of the Baptist, has a biographical sequence in polychrome relief, dating from the sixteenth century. This includes the execution and the disposal of the saint's remains, which according to legend were burnt in the reign of Julian the Apostate (fourth century) to prevent pilgrimages.

A remarkable Pre-Raphaelite portrayal is Christ in the House of His Parents by John Everett Millais. Here the Baptist is shown as a child, wearing a loin covering of animal skins, hurrying into Joseph's carpenter shop with a bowl of water to join Mary, Joseph, and Mary's mother Anne in soothing the injured hand of Jesus. Artistic interest enjoyed a considerable revival at the end of the nineteenth century with Symbolist painters such as Gustave Moreau and Puvis de Chavannes (National Gallery, London). Oscar Wilde's play Salome was illustrated by Aubrey Beardsley, giving rise to some of his most memorable images.

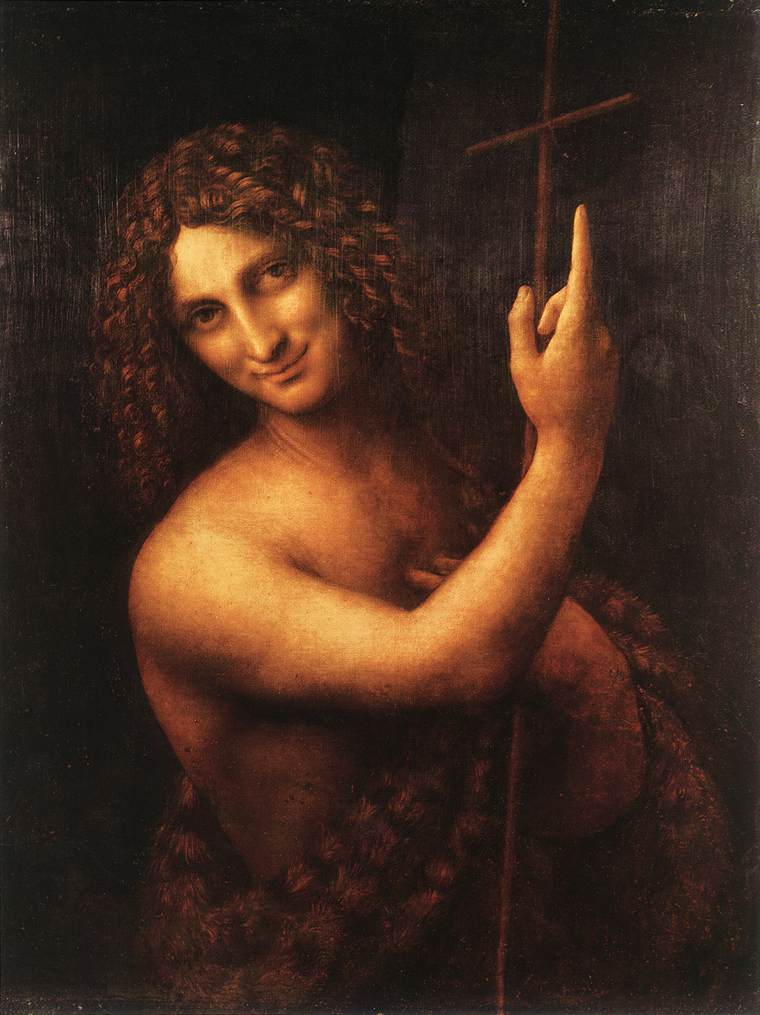
St. John the Baptist (c. 1513–1516), Leonardo da Vinci

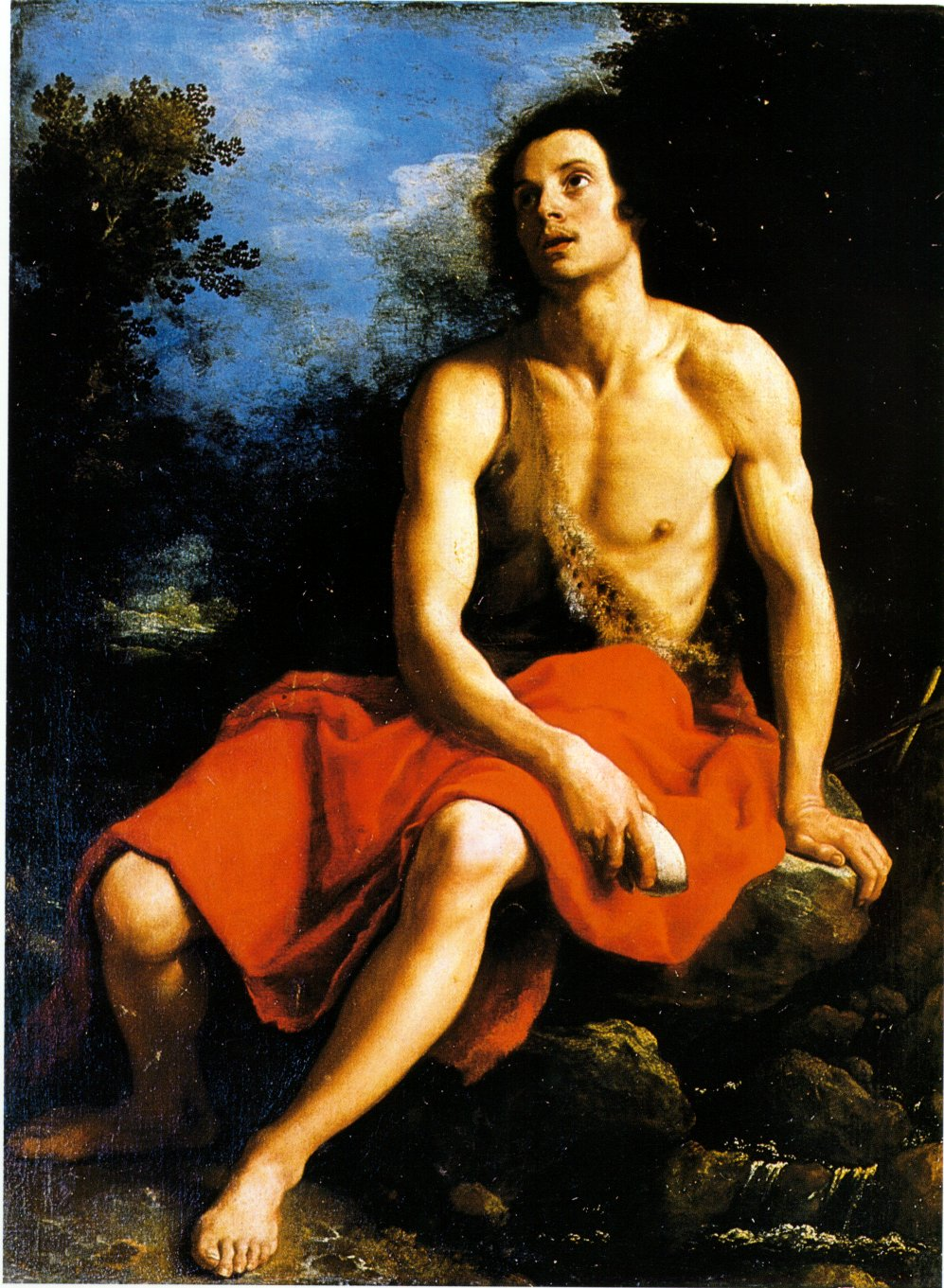
John the Baptist in the desert (1577–1621), Cristofano Allori

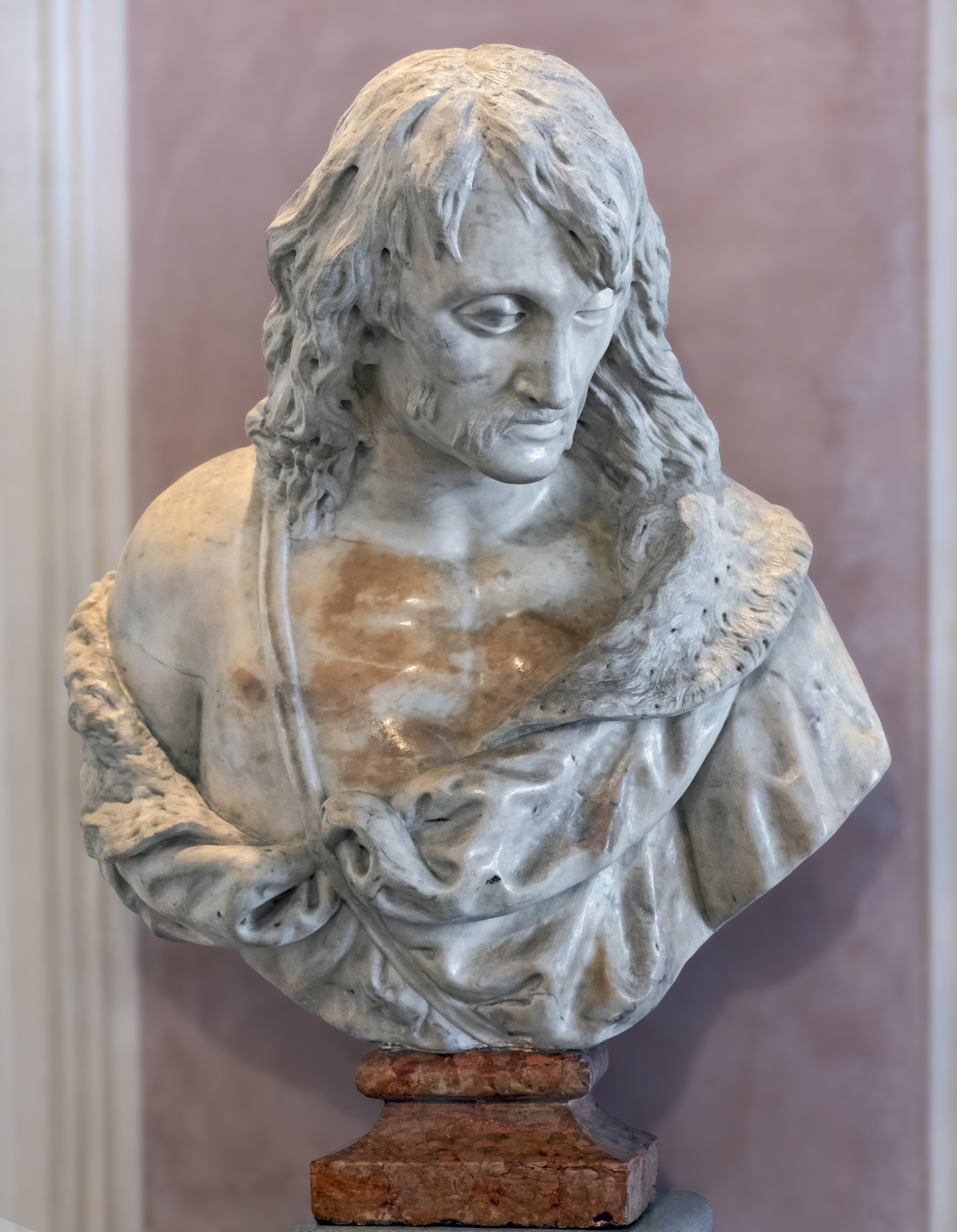
John the Baptist (seventeenth century), Michele Fabris

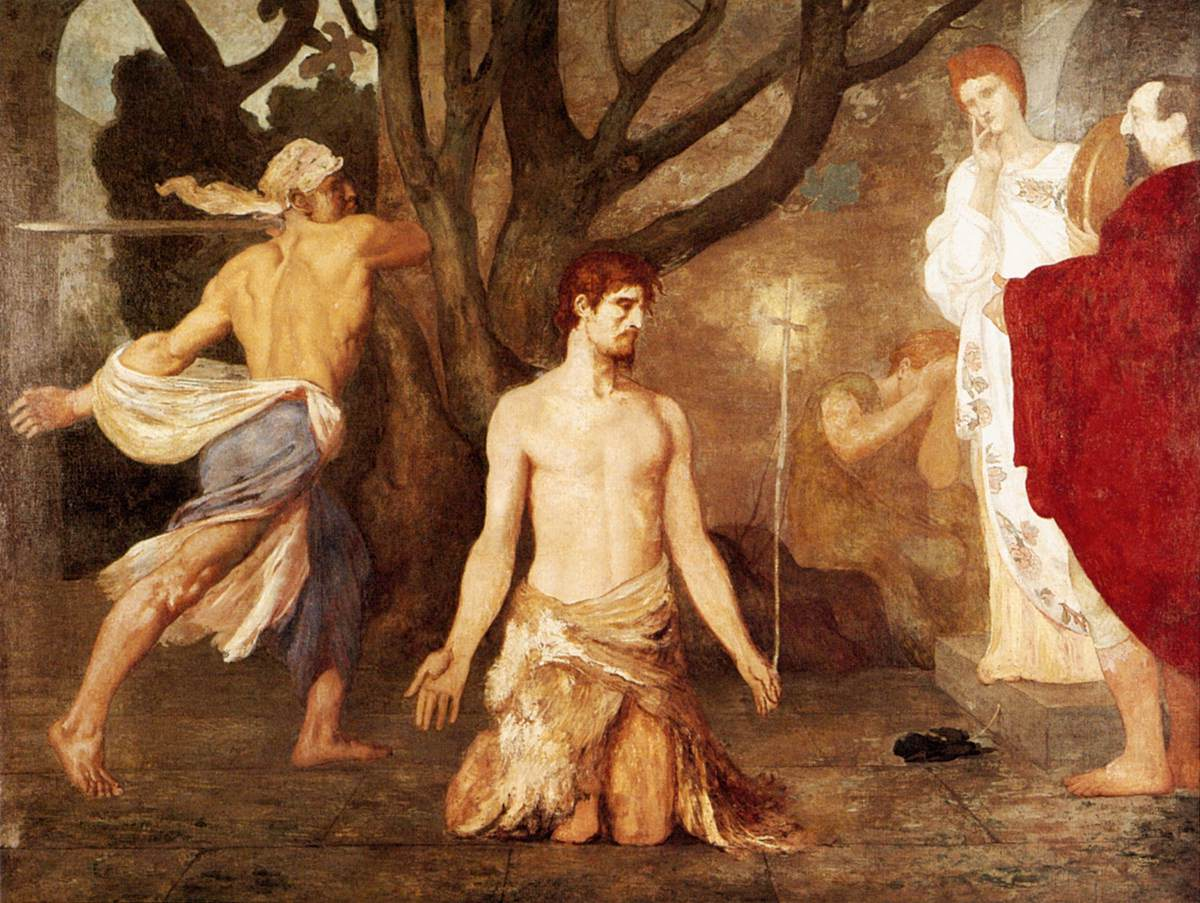
The Beheading of St John the Baptist, c. 1869, Puvis de Chavannes

=== In poetry ===
The Italian Renaissance poet Lucrezia Tornabuoni chose John the Baptist as one of the biblical figures about whom she wrote poetry.

He is also referenced in "The Love Song of J. Alfred Prufrock" by T. S. Eliot in stanza 13.

=== In music ===
- Guido D'Arezzo (991/992 – after 1033) an Italian Benedictine monk founded the standard music stave based on a hymn to Saint John the Baptist. The hymn that begins with Ut Queant Laxis uses the first syllable for each line – Ut (later changed to Do), Re, Mi, Fa, Sol, La, Si. The teaching is also known as the solmization syllable.
- This is the Record of John, by English Tudor composer Orlando Gibbons is a well-known part-setting of the Gospel of John for solo voice, choir and organ or viol accompaniment.
- The reformer Martin Luther wrote a hymn based on biblical accounts about the Baptist, "Christ unser Herr zum Jordan kam" (1541), based for a cantata by Johann Sebastian Bach for the feast day on 24 June, Christ unser Herr zum Jordan kam, BWV 7 (1724).
- S. Giovanni Battista (St. John the Baptist) is a 1676 oratorio by Alessandro Stradella.
- The well-known Advent hymn On Jordan's Bank the Baptist's cry was written by Charles Coffin.
- John the Baptist (Jokanaan), Baritone, is a character in the opera Salome by Richard Strauss, premiered 1905 in Dresden. The text is from Oscar Wilde's French play, translated into German by Hedwig Lachmann.
- In popular music, Bob Dylan dedicates four lines to John the Baptist in "Tombstone Blues", the second track of his 1965 album Highway 61 Revisited. He sings: "John the Baptist after torturing a thief/Looks up at his hero the Commander-in-Chief/Saying, "Tell me great hero, but please make it brief/Is there a hole for me to get sick in?".
- The song "John the Baptist (Holy John)" by Al Kooper on his 1971 album New York City (You're a Woman) is about John the Baptist. In the same year the song was also recorded by Blood, Sweat & Tears for their album Blood, Sweat & Tears 4.
- In his song "Everyman Needs a Companion", the closing track to his 2012 album Fear Fun, Father John Misty sings about the friendship between John the Baptist and Jesus of Nazareth: "John the Baptist took Jesus Christ/Down to the river on a Friday night/They talked about Mary like a couple of boys/With nothing to lose/Too scared to try."
- John the Baptist is referenced in the music of American heavy metal band Om in their 2009 song "Meditation Is the Practice of Death". As well as this, John the Baptist is depicted on the cover art of Om's 2012 album, Advaitic Songs.

=== In film and television ===
John the Baptist has appeared in a number of screen adaptations of the life of Jesus. Actors who have played John include James D. Ainsley in From the Manger to the Cross (1912), Nigel De Brulier in Salome (1923), Alan Badel in Salome (1953), Robert Ryan in King of Kings (1961), Mario Socrate in The Gospel According to St. Matthew (1964), Charlton Heston in The Greatest Story Ever Told (1965), David Haskell in Godspell (1973), Michael York in Jesus of Nazareth (1977), Eli Cohen in Jesus (1979), Andre Gregory in The Last Temptation of Christ (1988), Christopher Routh in Mary, Mother of Jesus (1999), David O'Hara in Jesus (1999), Scott Handy in The Gospel of John (2003), Aidan McArdle in Judas (2004), Daniel Percival in Son of God (2014), Abhin Galeya in Killing Jesus (2015), and David Amito in "The Chosen" (2019–2022).

Snapaka Yohannan (John the Baptist), a 1963 Indian Malayalam-language film depicts life of St. John the Baptist and his death at the hands of Salome, Herod Antipas and Herodias.

== Commemoration ==
=== Denominational festivals ===
Christian festivals associated with Saint John the Baptist and Forerunner are celebrated at various days by different denominations and are dedicated to his conception, birth, and death, as well as in correlation to the baptism of Jesus. The Eastern Church has feast days for the finding of his head (first, second, and third finding), as well as for his parents, Elizabeth and Zechariah. In the Russian Orthodox Church there is a feast day of the Transfer of the Right Hand of the Forerunner from Malta to Gatchina.

=== Association with summer solstice ===
The Feast of the nativity of Saint John closely coincides with the June solstice, also referred to as Midsummer in the Northern Hemisphere. The Christian holy day is fixed at 24 June; but in most countries festivities are mostly held the night before, on Saint John's Eve. "In England, 'Saint John's Tide' is combined with a midsummer celebration. Instead of the date of the summer solstice, they chose June 24. This may be because of the Baptist's own words, 'He must increase, but I must decrease' (John 3:30). John was, of course, referring to Jesus. John's day comes at the time when the sun is beginning to decrease..."

=== Patron saint and local festivals ===
==== Middle East ====
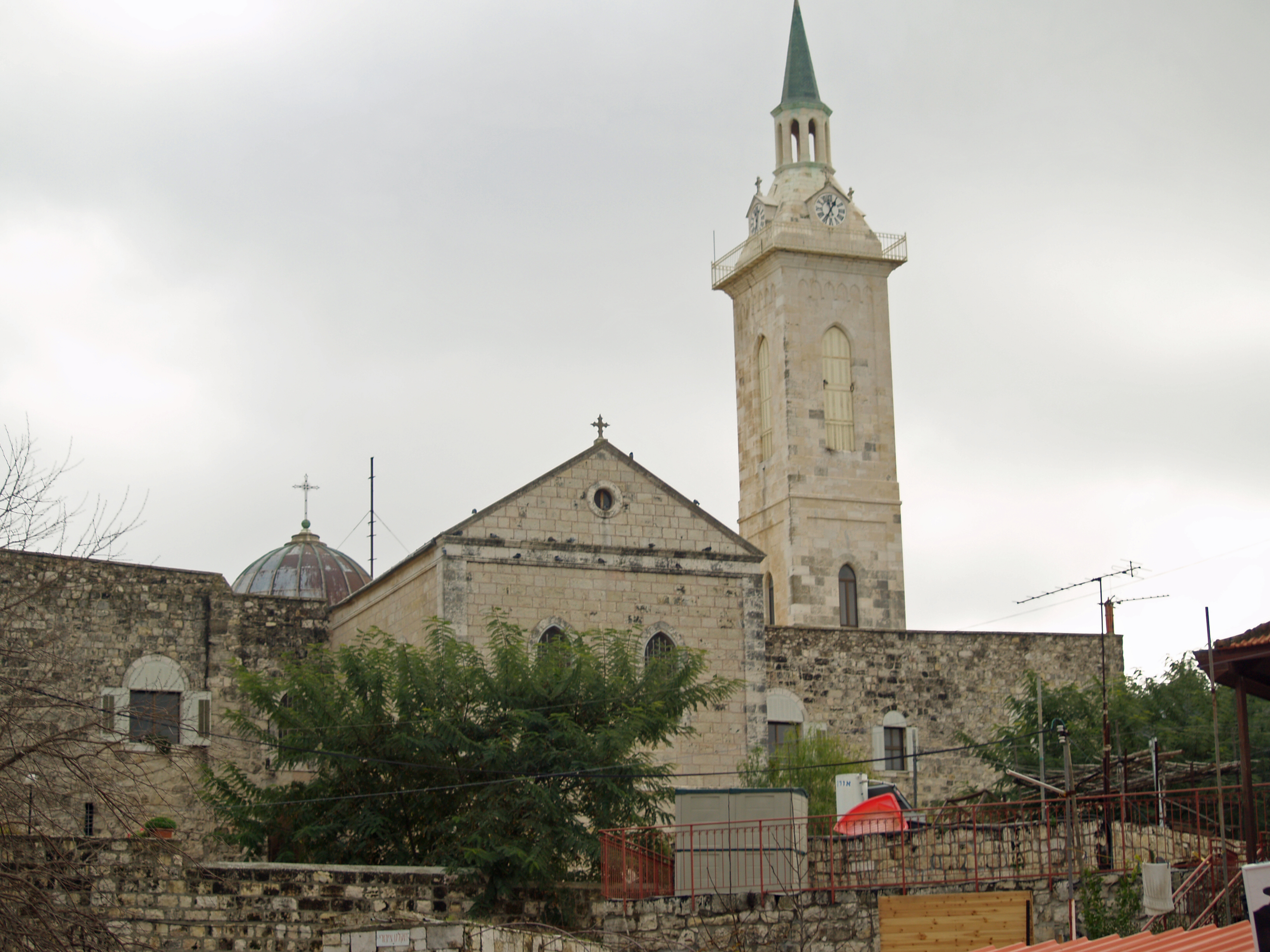
Catholic church at his traditional birthplace in Ein Kerem

Saint John the Baptist's beheading is said to have taken place in Machaerus, in central Jordan.

==== Europe ====
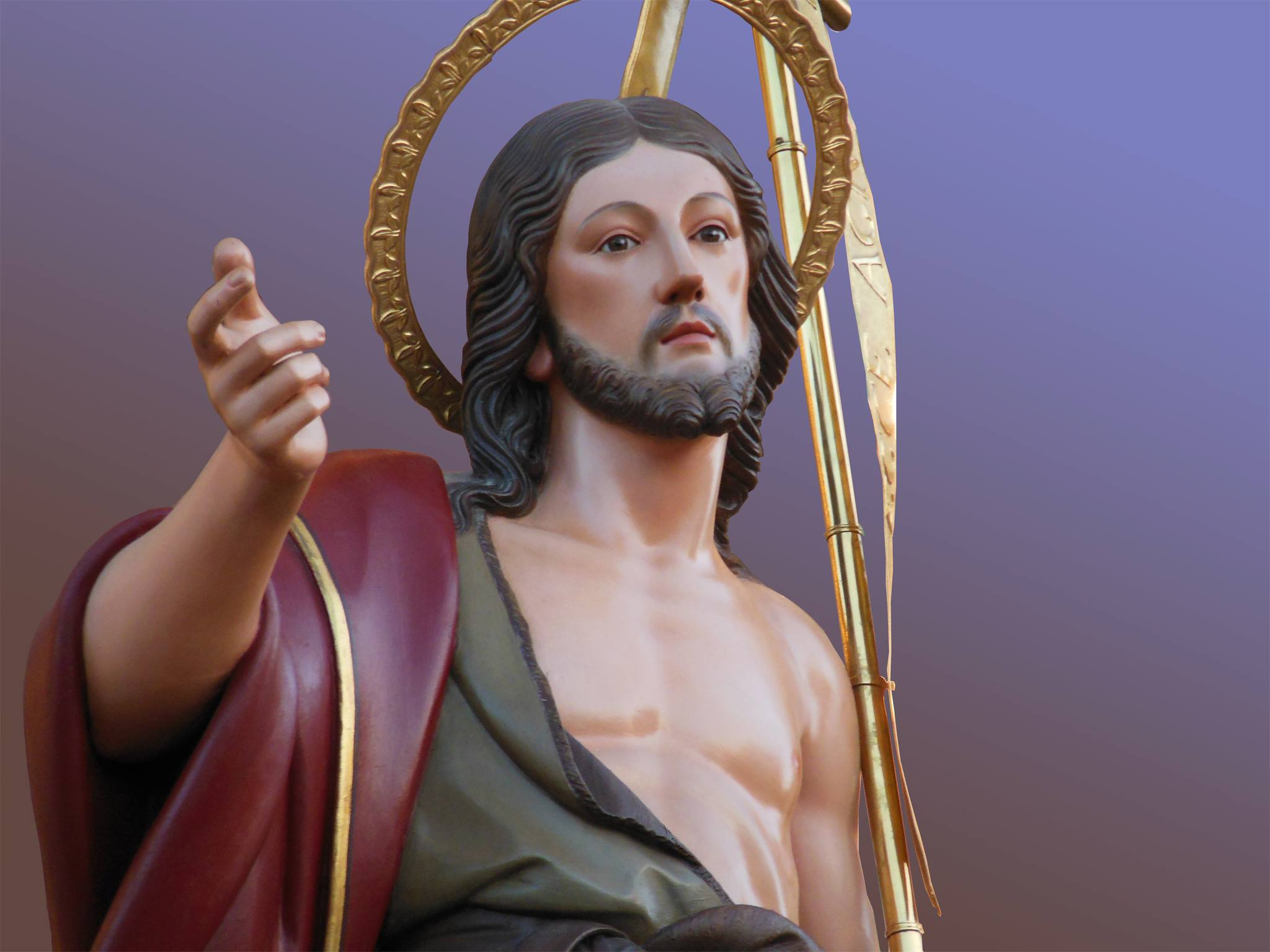
Wooden statue, Pietro Paolo Azzopardi, 1845, Xewkija

In Spain, Saint John was venerated during the feast of the Alhansara in Granada, and also in Gaztelugatxe.

In the United Kingdom, Saint John is the patron of Penzance, Cornwall. In Scotland, he is the patron saint of Perth, which used to be known as St. John's Toun of Perth. The main church in the city is still the medieval Kirk of St. John the Baptist and the city's professional football club is called St Johnstone F.C.

Also, on the night of 23 June on to the 24th, Saint John is celebrated as the patron saint of Porto, the second largest city in Portugal. An article from June 2004 in The Guardian remarked that "Porto's Festa de São João is one of Europe's liveliest street festivals, yet it is relatively unknown outside the country".

As patron saint of the original Order of Knights of the Hospital of Saint John, he is the patron of the Knights Hospitaller of Jerusalem, Malta, Florence, Cesena, Turin and Genoa, Italy; as well as of Malta as a whole and of Xewkija and Gozo in Malta, which remember him with a great feast on the Sunday nearest to 24 June.

==== Americas ====
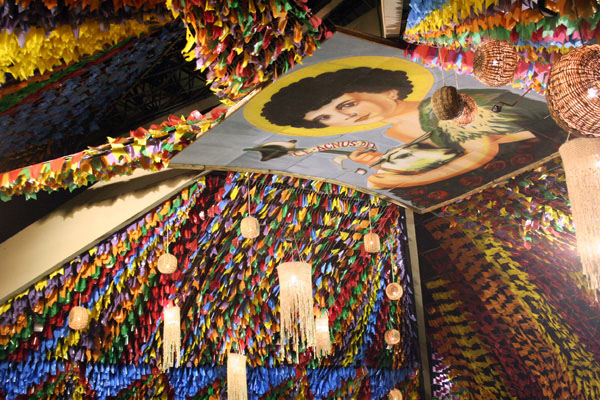
Saint John Festival in Campina Grande, Paraíba, Brazil

Saint John's Day, celebrated on June 24, is one of the most important dates in Brazil's traditional June Festivals, known as "Festas Juninas". These festivities are deeply rooted in the country's rural heritage and Catholic traditions, honoring Saint John the Baptist. Across Brazil, especially in the Northeast, cities like Campina Grande and Caruaru host massive celebrations with bonfires, "quadrilhas" (square dance), colorful customs, fireworks, and traditional foods, specially made from corn and peanut, such as "pamonha", "canjica", and "pé-de-moleque". In the North, particularly in the state of Amazonas, the "Festival de Parintins" adds a unique dimension to the June celebrations with the "Boi-Bumbá" folklore, perform theatrical retellings of Amazonian myths, mixing indigenous, African, and European cultural elements. More than a religious observance, the "Festa de São João" represents a vibrant expression of Brazilian folklore, reinforcing communal bonds and celebrating the diverse cultural identities that shape the nation.

Saint John the Baptist is the patron saint of the Commonwealth of Puerto Rico and its capital city, San Juan. In 1521, the island was given its formal name, "San Juan Bautista de Puerto Rico", following the custom of christening a town with its formal name and the name which Christopher Columbus had originally given the island. The names "San Juan Bautista" and "Puerto Rico" were eventually used in reference to both city and island, leading to a reversal in terminology by most inhabitants largely due to a cartographic error. By 1746, the city's name ("Puerto Rico") had become that of the entire island, while the name for the island ("San Juan Bautista") had become that of the city. The official motto of Puerto Rico also references the saint: Joannes Est Nomen Eius.

He is also a patron saint of French Canada and Newfoundland. The Canadian cities of St. John's, Newfoundland (1497), Saint John, New Brunswick (1604), and Saint-Jean-sur-Richelieu, Quebec (1665), were all named in his honour. His feast day of 24 June is celebrated officially in Quebec as the Fête Nationale du Québec and was previously celebrated in Newfoundland as Discovery Day.

He is also patron of the Roman Catholic Diocese of Charleston, which covers the whole of South Carolina in the United States.

==== Southeast Asia ====
Calamba, Laguna, Calumpit, Bulacan, Balayan, and Lian in Batangas, Sipocot, and San Fernando in Camarines Sur, Daet, Camarines Norte, San Juan, Metro Manila, Tabuelan, Cebu, Jimenez, Misamis Occidental, Badiangan, Banate, Dingle, Igbaras, and Sara in Iloilo and the oldest in Taytay, Rizal are among several places in the Philippines that venerate John as the town or city patron. A common practise of many Filipino fiestas in his honour is bathing and the dousing of people in memory of John's iconic act. The custom is similar in form to Songkran and Holi, and serves as a playful respite from the intense tropical heat. While famed for the Black Nazarene it enshrines, Quiapo Church in Manila actually has Saint John as its patron saint.

=== Orders and societies ===
A number of religious orders who include or have included in their name a mention of John the Baptist have been called Baptistines.

John the Baptist is the name-giving patron of the Knights Hospitaller, also called Knights of Saint John.

Along with John the Evangelist, John the Baptist is claimed as a patron saint by the fraternal society of Freemasons.

== See also ==
- Basilica of St. John the Baptist, Berlin
- Chronology of Jesus
- Church of the Beheading of Saint John the Baptist of Saulnot
- Historical background of the New Testament
- List of biblical figures identified in extra-biblical sources
- Lyon Cathedral
- Messengers from John the Baptist
- St. John the Baptist Cathedral (disambiguation)
- Saint John the Baptist Church (disambiguation)
- St. John Baptist Church (disambiguation)
- Statue of John the Baptist, Charles Bridge
