= Demons in Mandaeism =

Inhabitants of the World of Darkness in Mandaeism

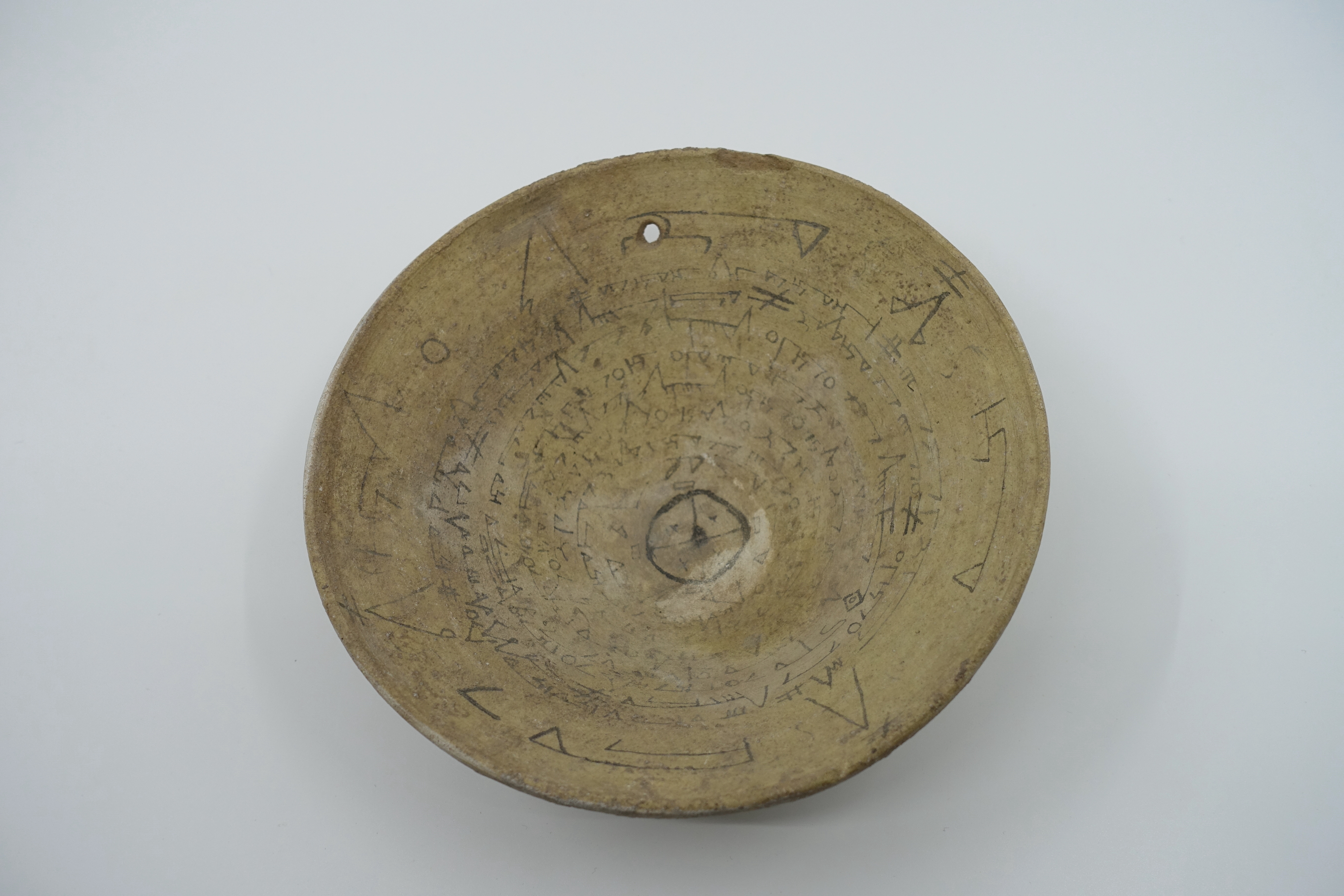
This Mandaic incantation bowl dated between the 5th and the 8th century is inscribed with a charm and would have been buried upside down in the house to imprison demons. In the collection of the Jewish Museum of Switzerland.

In Mandaeism, various beings inhabit the World of Darkness.

== Types ==
According to the Right Ginza, the World of Darkness consists of many demons, dewis, and evil spirits, including:

- hmurtha "amulet-spirit"
- lilith
- ʿkuri "temple-spirit"
- priki "shrine-spirit"
- patikri "idol-demon"
- arkoni "archon"
- malaki "angel"
- nalai "vampire"
- niuli "hobgoblin"
- piga "misadventure demon"
- pilgi "mutant demon"
- latabi "devil"
- lihani "net-spirit"
- gadulta "ghost"
- saṭani "Satan"

Other types of demons mentioned in Book 18 of the Right Ginza are:

- dagalta "female demon"
- diba < Middle Persian dēw'
- patikrā < Old Persian patikāra 'sculpture, image'
- šidā < Akkadian šēdu 'a protective genie with the head of a man and the body of a winged lion'

The Right Ginza describes them as:

- haškia "gloomy"
- kumia "black"
- ṭupšania "filthy"
- mriddia "rebellious"
- rgizia "furious"
- zidania "wrathful"
- zihirania "venomous"
- saklia "foolish"
- ndidia "repulsive"
- ṣahnia "stinking"
- zapuria "putrid"
- harašia "mute"
- ṭriṣia "deaf"
- ṭmimia "insensible"
- tahmia "dull"
- algia "stuttering"
- dugia "unhearing"
- gugia "babbling"
- pigia "idiots"
- šgišia "frightful"
- laiadita "ignorant"
- haṣipia "arrogant"
- hamimia "hot-headed"
- taqipia "powerful"
- haripia "harsh"
- rugzania "ill-tempered"
- raktania "lustful"
- bnia zma "children of blood"

== Demons in the Ginza Rabba ==
=== Main demons ===
Other than Ur, Ruha and her entourage of the 7 planets and 12 constellations, some infernal beings mentioned in the Ginza Rabba are:

- Anathan (Anatan) – husband of Qin; described as a "warrior" and "war-like" in Book 5, Chapter 1 of the Right Ginza
- Gaf and Gafan (Gap and Gapan)
- Giu (Giuo)
- Hag and Mag (Hagh and Magh) – a male and female pair of demons, respectively
- Krun (Karun)
- Qin – queen of darkness, mother of Ruha, grandmother of Ur; one of her epithets is Sumqaq
- Shdum (Šdum; Ashdum, Ašdum) – a ruler of the underworld
- Zahreil (Zahrʿil) – daughter of Qin and wife of Hibil Ziwa
- Zartai-Zartanai

=== Minor demons ===
Other demons mentioned in the Ginza Rabba are:

- Aṭirpan (Aṭarpan), literally "foliage," mentioned with Lupan in Book 3 of the Right Ginza
- Lupan, mentioned with Aṭirpan in Book 3 of the Right Ginza
- Himun, described as a "man" in Book 5, Chapter 2 and Book 6 of the Right Ginza; one of the matarta guards
- Karipiun (Karafiun), described as a "devourer" in Book 5, Chapter 3 of the Right Ginza
- Karkum, described as a son of Ur in Book 4 of the Right Ginza
- Shiqlun (Šiqlun), mentioned in Book 15, Chapter 6 of the Right Ginza
- Zamur, described as an "evil spirit" in Book 8 of the Right Ginza

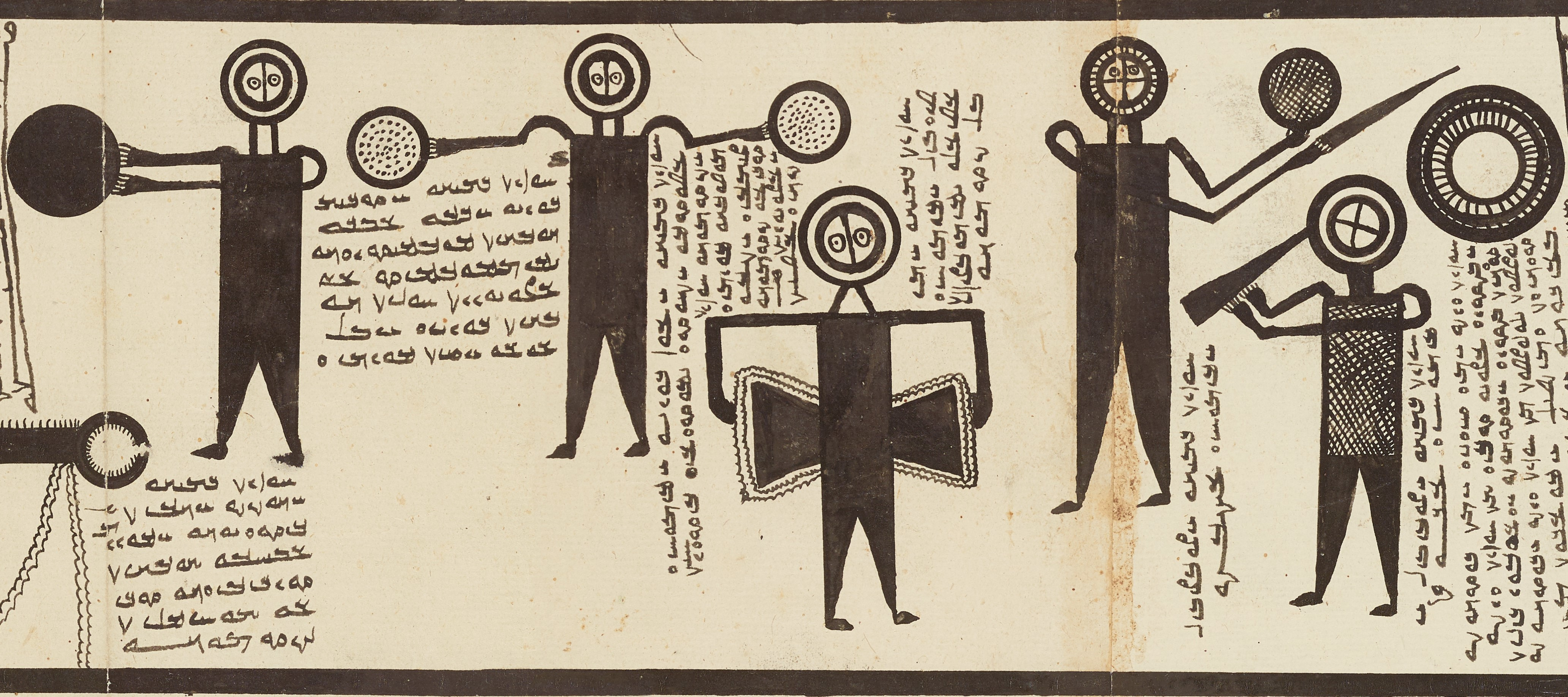
Illustrations of various demons in the Scroll of Abatur (DC 8), including Šdum, Baz, Miṭiaiel, and Gargiel

Demons mentioned in the Diwan Abatur who often accompany Ur and Shdum include:

- Baz
- Miṭiaiel
- Gargiel
- Šahra
- Nufsai
- El-Sfar the Small
- Ṭabadaga
- Zuṭ
- Gaṣiaiel
- Ṭarfan
- Zamriel
- Qardum
- Simiaiil

=== Right Ginza 5.1 ===
In Book 5, Chapter 1 of the Right Ginza (also known as the "Book of the Underworld"), Hibil Ziwa descends the worlds of the "kings" and "giants of darkness" in the following order:

- Zartai-Zartanai and his wife Amamit (an epithet of Libat, or Venus)
- Hag and Mag, the two manas of darkness
- Gap and Gapan, the mighty giants of darkness
- Anatan and Qin
- Šdum (Ašdum), king of darkness
- Giu
- Krun, King of Darkness, great mountain of flesh (ṭura rba ḏ-bisra)

=== Pillars of Jerusalem ===
In Book 15, Chapter 11 of the Right Ginza, the pillars of Jerusalem are named as:

- ʿUsraʿil
- Yaqip
- Adunai
- Zatan
- Ṣihmai
- Karkum

Some of these names are also associated with beings in the World of Darkness, such as Karkum and Adunai (another name for Šamiš or the Sun).

== Five Lords ==
Mandaeans also consider the "Five Lords of the World of Darkness" to be:

- Zartai-Zartanai
- Hag and Mag
- Gap and Gapan
- Šdum
- Krun

The paired demons are considered to rule together as single lords, since Mag and Gapan are female consorts who are always with their male consorts Hag and Gap, respectively.

== Skandola demons ==
Krun, Hag, and Ur are depicted on the skandola, a ritual talismanic seal used by Mandaeans to protect against evil.

== See also ==
- Incantation bowl
- Mandaic lead rolls
- List of Mandaic manuscripts
- Mesopotamian demons
- Demons in Judaism
- Christian demonology
- Mandaean cosmology
