= Hibil =

Envoy in Mandaeism

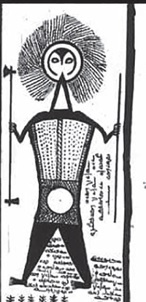
- Hibil Ziwa in the Scroll of the Rivers (DC 7)
- Other names: Hibil Ziwa
- Abode: World of Light
- Mantra: "In the name of Hibil, Šitil, and Anuš" (b-šumaihun ḏ-Hibil u-Šitil u-Anuš)
- Texts: The Baptism of Hibil Ziwa

Equivalents
- Jewish: Abel
- Abrahamic religions: Gabriel
- Aramean: Yarhibol

In Mandaeism, Hibil (Classical Mandaic: ࡄࡉࡁࡉࡋ) or Hibil Ziwa (Classical Mandaic: ࡄࡉࡁࡉࡋ ࡆࡉࡅࡀ, lit. 'Splendid Hibil', Modern Mandaic pronunciation: [ˈhibɪl ˈziwa]) and sometimes pronounced Hīwel is referred to an uthra ("excellency", an angel or guardian) from the World of Light or the son of Adam (then only referred to as Hibil). Hibil, the man, is considered to be the Mandaean equivalent of Abel while Hibil Ziwa is the Mandaean equivalent of Gabriel

Prayers in the Qulasta frequently contain the recurring formula "In the name of Hibil, Shitil, and Anuš" (ࡁࡔࡅࡌࡀࡉࡄࡅࡍ ࡖࡄࡉࡁࡉࡋ ࡅࡔࡉࡕࡉࡋ ࡅࡀࡍࡅࡔ b-šumaihun ḏ-Hibil u-Šitil u-Anuš).

== Overview ==
According to Mandaean beliefs and scriptures including the Qolastā, the Mandaean Book of John and Genzā Rabbā, Abel is cognate with the Human Hibil, and Hibil Ziwa with Gabriel.

Hibil Ziwa (ࡄࡉࡁࡉࡋ ࡆࡉࡅࡀ, sometimes translated "Splendid Hibel") is spoken of as a son of Manda d-Hayyi who was created by Hayyi, as stated in the Right Ginza book 4, verse 2; "When the First Life thought and created Manda d-Hiia and Manda d-hiia created Hibil-Ziwa...". And Hibil, the man, is spoken of as a brother to Anush (Enosh) and to Shitil (Seth), who is the son of Adam. Elsewhere, Anush is spoken of as the son of Shitil, and Shitil as the son of Hibil, where Hibil came to Adam and Eve as a young boy when they were still virgins, but was called their son. Hibil Ziwa is an important lightworld being (uthra) who conquered the World of Darkness. As Yawar Hibil, he is one of multiple figures known as Yawar (Classical Mandaic: ࡉࡀࡅࡀࡓ, lit. 'Helper'), being so named by and after his father. Brikha Nasoraia (2022) and Sandra van Rompaey (2011) note many resemblances between the Aramean deity Yarhibol and Yawar Hibil, in terms of both the names and artistic representations.

According to Brikha Nasoraia (2022), Hibil Ziwa is also occasionally referred to as Gabreil Šliha (or Gabriel ǝ-Šlihā).

In the Scroll of Abatur, Hibil Ziwa tells the uthra Abatur to go and reside in the boundary between the World of Light and the World of Darkness, and weigh for purity those souls which have passed through all the purgatories and wish to return to the light.

== Hibil Ziwa's Descent to the World of Darkness ==
Hibil Ziwa's soteriological descent to the World of Darkness and his baptisms before and after are detailed in book 5 of the Right Volume of the Ginza Rabba, and also in a separate text named The Baptism of Hibil Ziwa (Classical Mandaic: ࡃࡉࡅࡀࡍ ࡌࡀࡑࡁࡅࡕࡀ ࡖࡄࡉࡁࡉࡋ ࡆࡉࡅࡀ, romanized: Diwan Maṣbuta ḏ-Hibil Ziwa). Hibil Ziwa battles and defeats Krun and seals the abodes of the rulers of darkness. Some versions of this account have parallels with the Hymn of the Pearl included in the Acts of Thomas.

In response to an upset of the dualistic balance of the universe, Manda d-Hayyi summons Hibil Ziwa, whom the King of Light proceeds to baptise in 360,000 or 360 yardeni. In connection with this baptism, Hibil Ziwa is bestowed with 360 robes of light, the Great Mystery, seven staves, and the name Yawar, amongst other attributes.

Hibil Ziwa is dispatched to the World of Darkness and enters the world of Ruha, lingering for many ages until the Great Mystery instructs him to descend further. He descends to the world of Zartai-Zartanai, remaining there undetected for many ages while aiding the beings of light accompanying him with prayers and supplications, before descending through the worlds of Hag and Mag and of Gaf and Gafan, and confronting Shdum over the disturbance in the world of light. Shdum directs Hibil Ziwa further down to Giu, who directs Hibil Ziwa further down to Giu's brother Krun, whom Hibil Ziwa battles. Krun surrenders and hands over seals to secure Hibil Ziwa's passage through the World of Darkness (see also skandola).

Hibil Ziwa ascends, sealing the abodes of Giu and Shdum, to the world of Qin. According to The Baptism of Hibil Ziwa, Qin-Anatan is the consort of Gaf; according to the Right Ginza, Hibil Ziwa assumes the appearance of Anathan, who is the husband of Qin. Hibil Ziwa asks Qin what they are made from, and Qin shows him the murky waters, which the Great Mystery informs him is utter bitterness and the sole constant of the World of Darkness. Hibil Ziwa then ascends back to the world of Gaf and Gafan. In the Diwan Maṣbuta ḏ-Hibil Ziwa, Qin had also revealed the mysteries of the jewel, mirror and bitter herb (explained as supplying the strength of the World of Darkness) to Hibil in response to his questions, and he had secretly taken them, while in the Right Ginza, Hibil Ziwa marries Zahreil, the daughter of Qin, while undercover in the world of Gaf and Gafan, and she shows him the spring with the mirror (said to show the past and future), which he takes. In this version, Hibil Ziwa is said not to have copulated with Zahreil, since his intention was to locate the mysteries rather than to get married, although some other accounts consider Ptahil a son of Hibil Ziwa and Zahreil.

Hibil Ziwa disguises himself as Gaf and appears to Ruha, who is pregnant with Ur. He leads her out of the world of Gaf and Gafan, sealing its gates, seals the gates of the world of Zartai-Zartanai, commands the Great Mystery to confound Ruha, and seals her in her world. The Diwan Maṣbuta ḏ-Hibil Ziwa also mentions Hibil Ziwa taking away dark waters and Ptahil.

Hibil offers prayers to the King of Light, who sends for Manda d-Hayyi to send a Letter of Kushta and phial of oil to Hibil, which are received, but Hibil and his companions remain detained by the powers of darkness, until a masiqta is performed, following which they ascend to the middle world. This alarms the guards, in response to which the Great Mana dispatches Yushamin, who interrogates Hibil Ziwa's identity and permits him re-entry to the World of Light, upon which he is baptised 360 times again.

== Invocation ==
In modern times, some Mandaeans invoke the name of Hibil Ziwa (ࡉࡀ ࡄࡉࡁࡉࡋ ࡆࡉࡅࡀ "Ya, Hibil Ziwa") during times of danger.

== See also ==
- List of angels in theology
- Katabasis § Trip into the underworld
- Dying-and-rising deity
- Dehwa Hanina
- Yarhibol
