= Devil =

Mythical personification of evil

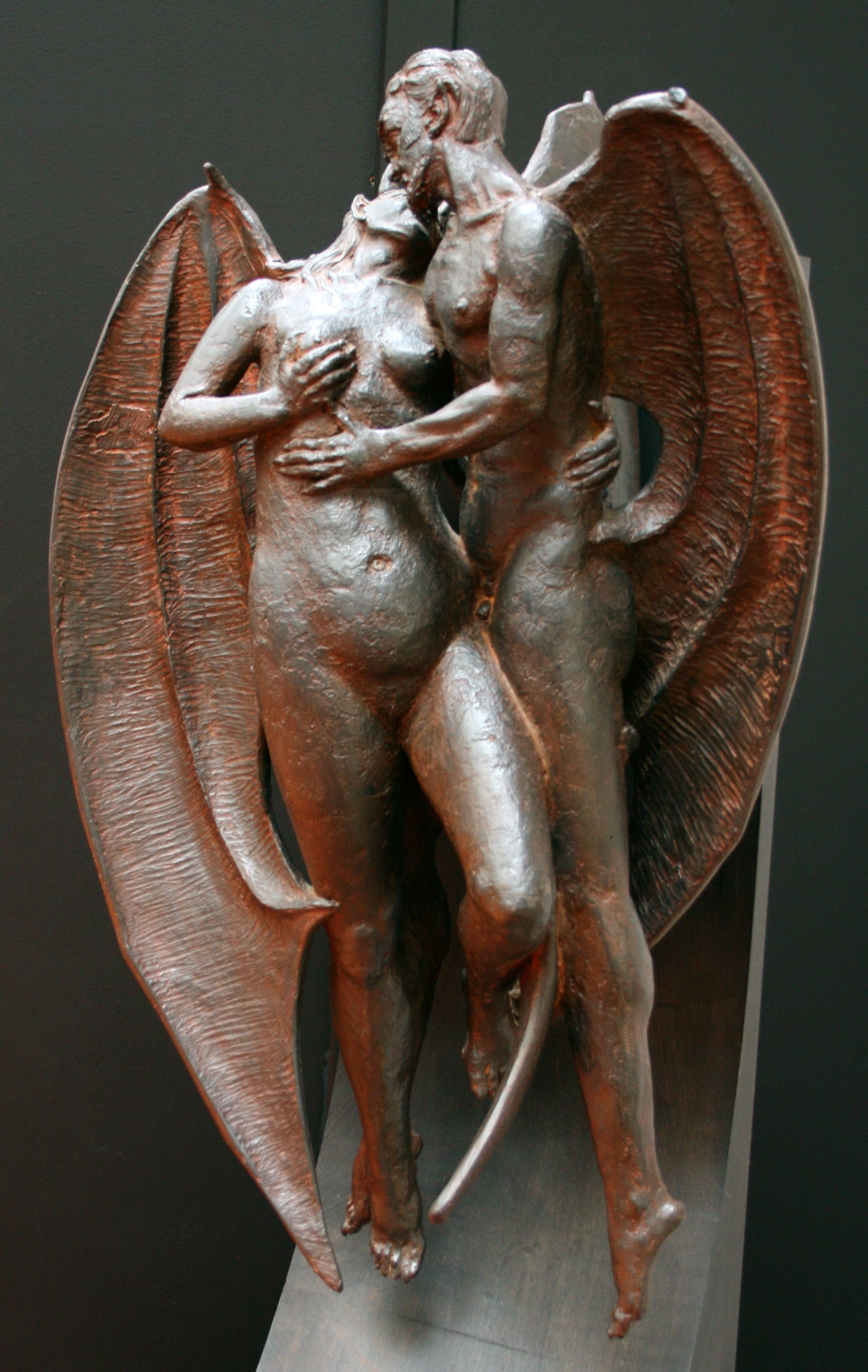
Statue of the devil in "the Devil Museum" in Kaunas, Lithuania

The devil is a mythical personification of evil as conceived in various cultures and religious traditions. It is seen as the objectification of a hostile and destructive force. Jeffrey Burton Russell states that the different conceptions of the Devil can be summed up as 1. a principle of evil independent from God, 2. an aspect of God, 3. a created being turning evil (a fallen angel) or 4. a symbol of human evil.

Each tradition, culture, and religion with a devil in its mythos offers a different lens on manifestations of evil. The history of these perspectives intertwines with theology, mythology, psychiatry, art, and literature, developing independently within each of the traditions. In Christian and Islamic traditions, the Devil is often seen as a tempter who leads people into sin and commands demons. It occurs historically in many contexts and cultures, and is given many different names—Satan (Judaism), Lucifer (Christianity), Beelzebub, Mephistopheles (German), Iblis or Azazil (Islam)—and attributes: it is portrayed as blue, black, or red; it is portrayed as having horns on its head, and without horns, and so on.

== Etymology ==
The Modern English word devil derives from the Middle English devel, from the Old English dēofol, that in turn represents an early Germanic borrowing of the Latin diabolus. This in turn was borrowed from the Greek διάβολος diábolos, "slanderer".

== Definitions ==
In his book The Devil: Perceptions of Evil from Antiquity to Primitive Christianity, Jeffrey Burton Russell discusses various meanings and difficulties that are encountered when using the term devil. He does not claim to define the word in a general sense, but he describes the limited use that he intends for the word in his book—limited in order to "minimize this difficulty" and "for the sake of clarity". In this book Russell uses the word devil as "the personification of evil found in a variety of cultures", as opposed to the word Satan, which he reserves specifically for the figure in the Abrahamic religions.

Yvonne Bonnetain describes the Devil as a mythic explanation model, in form of a personified supernatural power, for death, disease, and everything hostile to humanity.

In the Introduction to his book Satan: A Biography, Henry Ansgar Kelly discusses various considerations and meanings that he has encountered in using terms such as devil and Satan, etc. While not offering a general definition, he describes that in his book "whenever diabolos is used as the proper name of Satan", he signals it by using "small caps".

The Oxford English Dictionary has a variety of definitions for the meaning of "devil", supported by a range of citations: "Devil" may refer to Satan, the supreme spirit of evil, or one of Satan's emissaries or demons that populate Hell, or to one of the spirits that possess a demoniac person; "devil" may refer to one of the "malignant deities" feared and worshiped by "heathen people", a demon, a malignant being of superhuman powers; figuratively "devil" may be applied to a wicked person, or playfully to a rogue or rascal, or in empathy often accompanied by the word "poor" to a person—"poor devil".

== History ==
=== Pre-Historic period to Archaic period ===
Most early belief-systems had no unifying concept of evil. In the oldest available records, evil is part of nature. Evil came to be symbolized by figures portrayed as corrupt and wicked. In Mesopotamia, evil is sometimes said to derive from primordial chaos, but there are no inherently evil demons or devils. Various spirits and deities could do both good and evil depending on whim. The oldest known Egyptian beliefs had no evil deities; the gods were morally ambivalent and required to submit to the divine order of the cosmos, evil being an action violating said harmony. In old Hindu beliefs, deities, reflecting the supreme reality, are both benevolent and fierce. Even in the Old Testament, the evil, and hence devilish characteristics, are an expression of Yahweh's wrath. Among ancient Middle Eastern beliefs, Zorastrianism was the first institutionized belief-system which developed a clear demonology headed by a supreme spirit of Evil (Angra Mainyu), i.e. Devil.

Around 600 BC, Zarathustra urged his followers to turn away from the devas, in favor of dedicating worship to Ahura Mazda alone. Unique to Zarathustra's revelation was that he claimed that evil is not part of the Godhead (or ultimate reality), but a separate principle independent from God. For the formulation of Good and Evil as entirely separate principles, Zarathustra argued that God (Ahura Mazda) freely chooses goodness, while Angra Mainyu freely chooses evil. By doing so, he established the first known dualistic cosmological system, which would later influence other religions, including Judaism, Christianity, Manichaeism, and Islam. Alienated from the new sole deity, spirits of previous belief-systems thus became associated with the forces of evil and hence demons. As servants of the destructive spirit, the demons were believed to follow only evil; inflicting pain and causing destruction. Unfortunate souls, who find themselves in the domain of the evil spirits after death (i.e. in hell), are also tortured by the demons. Spirits found to align with the new sole deity then became the Godhead's servants (i.e. angels).

Thus, the originally monistic Canaanite form of Judaism absorbs parts of Persian dualistic tendencies during the Post-exilic period. However, Second-Temple Judaism, and later Christianity, differ from Persian dualism in some regards: the proposed omnipotence of God of the former does not allow for a radical dualism as proposed by Zorastrianism and later Manichaeism. Judeo-Christian tradition differs from earlier monistic beliefs by limiting the power of their Godhead through an evil principle or force, introduced by Zorastrianism. Christianity in particular, struggled with reconciling God's omnipresence with God's benevolence. While Zorastrianism sacrificed God's omnipotence for God's benevolence, thus giving rise to a principle Devil as independent from God, Christianity mostly insisted on the Devil being created and mildly dependent on God.

=== Platonism and early Christianity in Antiquity ===
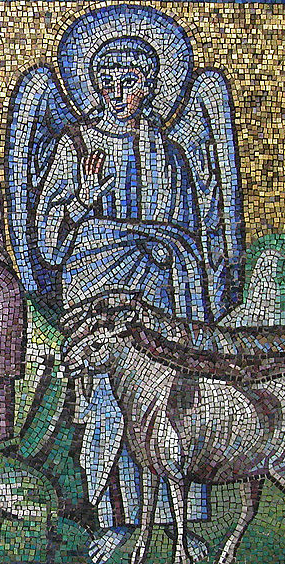
Excerpt of a Byzantine-Mosaic-Image. A blue angel, probably representing the Devil, standing before goats. Early 6th century.

One way Christianity addressed the problem of evil was by distinguishing between mind and body, an idea inherited from Greek Platonism. Similar to Zorastrianism, Platonism was dualistic. However, Platonism and Christianity differ from Persian dualism insofar as that they associated goodness only with spirit and evil with matter, proposing a form of mind–body dualism. According to Plato, God is like a craftsman (Demiurge) who builds the best possible world. However, God has to abide by the laws of nature and can only work with the material presented. Matter, thus, becomes the refractionary element in Plato's and later Neoplatonic models of the cosmos, resisting the perfection God originally intended. In religious beliefs, applying such theories of evil, matter (Greek: hyle Ὕλη) becomes a sphere of lack of goodness and transforms matter into the devilish principle par excellence.

According to Neoplatonic cosmology, evil (or matter) results from a lack of goodness. The good spirit at the centre gives rise to several emanations, each decreasing in goodness and increasing in deficiency. Thus, in Christianity, following the privation theory of the Neo-Platonists, the Devil became the principle for the thing most remote from God. Details were worked out by Christian scholars, such as Pseudo-Dionysius the Areopagite and John of Damascus who argued that evil is merely a lack (or removal) of goodness. As such, the Devil was conceptualized as a fallen angel; a being brought forth as good first, but then turned evil by abandoning goodness. John of Damascus used the privation theory to combat dualistic approaches to evil. Similar rebuttals were written by Augustine of Hippo.

The possibly strongest form of body-mind dualism, and a radical step back towards absolute dualism as conceptualized earlier in Zorastrianism, was reestablished by Manichaeism. Manichaeism was a major religion founded in the third century AD by the Parthian prophet Mani (c. 216–274 AD), in the Sasanian Empire. One of its key concepts is the doctrine of Two Principles and Three Moments: the world could be described as resulting from a past moment, in which two principles (good and evil) were separate, a contemporary moment in which both principles are mixed due to an assault of the world of darkness on the realm of light, and a future moment when both principles are distinct forever.

=== Spread through Europe in late Antiquity and early Medieval Age ===
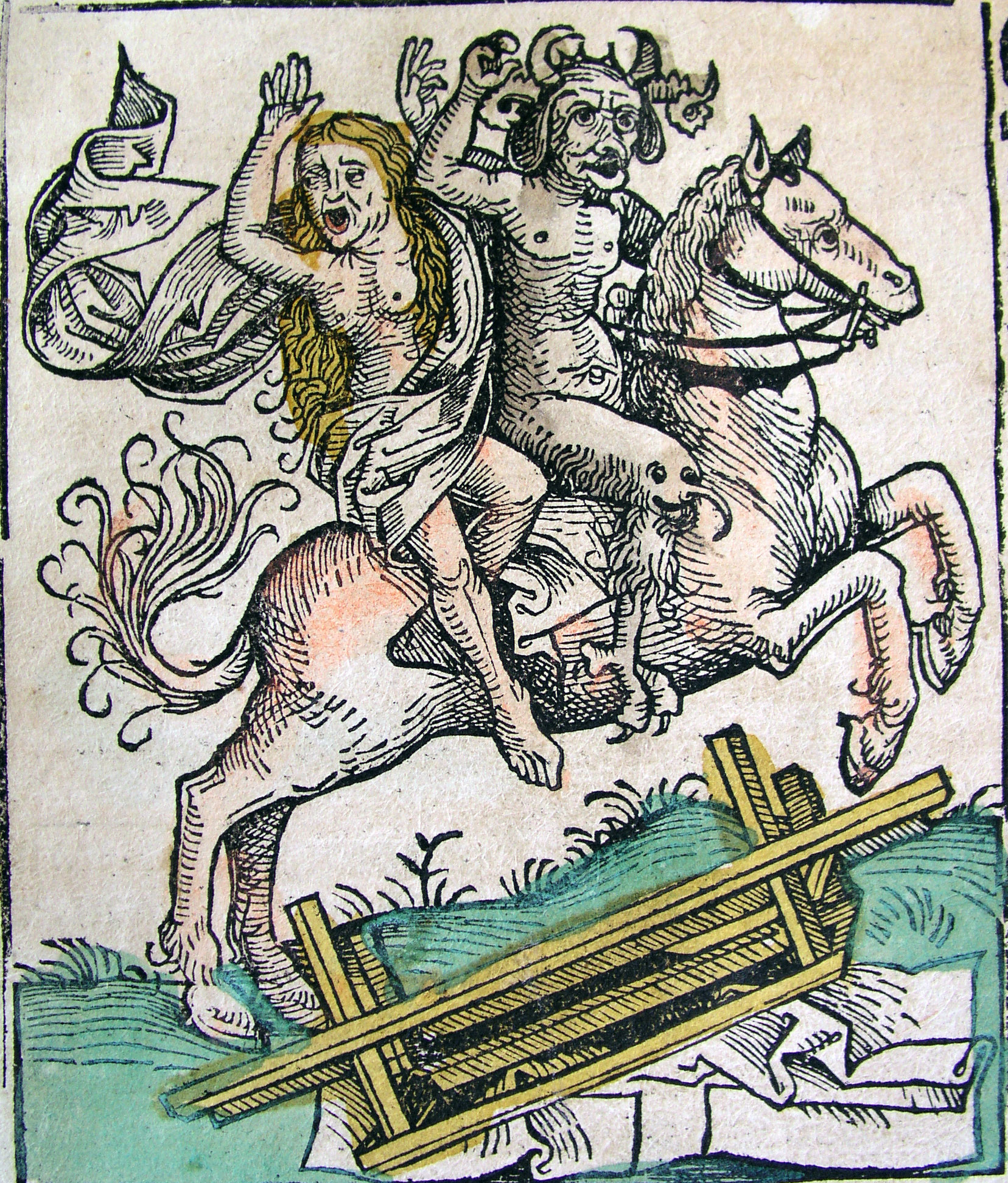
The Devil on horseback. Nuremberg Chronicle (1493).

Due to Christian dualistic monotheism, non-Christian deities became associated with demons. Ephesians 6:12, stating " our struggle is not against flesh and blood, but against the rulers, against the authorities, against the powers of this dark world and against the spiritual forces of evil in the heavenly realms" inspired early Christians to think of themselves on a mission to "drive out demons". By the fourth century, most Christians took it for granted that the Greek pagans worshipped demons and thus belong to the realm of the spiritually impure. In the 2nd century, Justin Martyr already conceptualized the pagan deities as demons, responsible for persecution of Christians. By the end of the sixth century, Mediterranean society widely identified themselves as unequivocally Christian, with an exception to Jews. The last recorded worship of another non-Christian deity is dated to the 570s. Tatian considered the pagan gods to be under the power of fate. The daimons (spirits) of the Greeks thus became the demons of the Christian's belief-system under the leadership of Zeus, whom they equated with the Devil, i.e. the leader of the foreign spirits. The Christians, however, would have broken free from the influence of the gods of the Greek pantheon and thus also free from the fetters of fate and the law.

Abstract notions of the Devil, such as regarding evil as the mere absence of good, were far too subtle to be embraced by most theologians during the Early Middle Ages. Instead, they sought a more concrete image of the Devil to represent spiritual struggle and pain. Thus, the Devil became more of a concrete entity. From the 4th through the 12th centuries, Christian ideas combined with European pagan beliefs, created a vivid folklore about the Devil. In many German folktales, the deceived giants of pagan tales, are substituted by a devil. For example, the devil builds a bridge in exchange for the first passing being's soul, then people let a dog pass the bridge first and the devil is cheated. At the same time, magical rites calling upon pagan deities were replaced by references to Jesus Christ.

=== Revival of Dualism in the Medieval Age ===
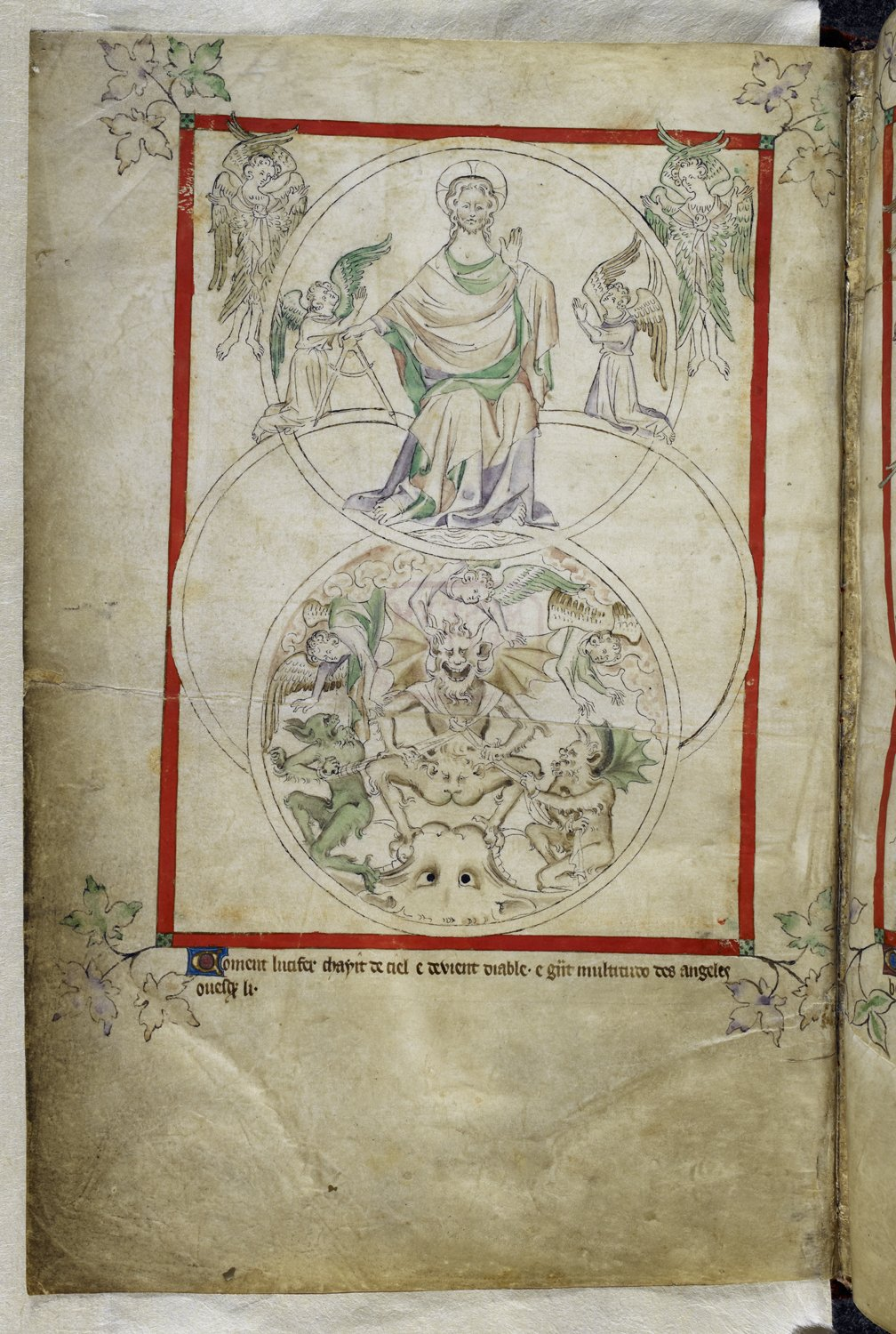
God and Lucifer – The Queen Mary Psalter (1310–1320), f.1v – BL Royal MS 2 B VII

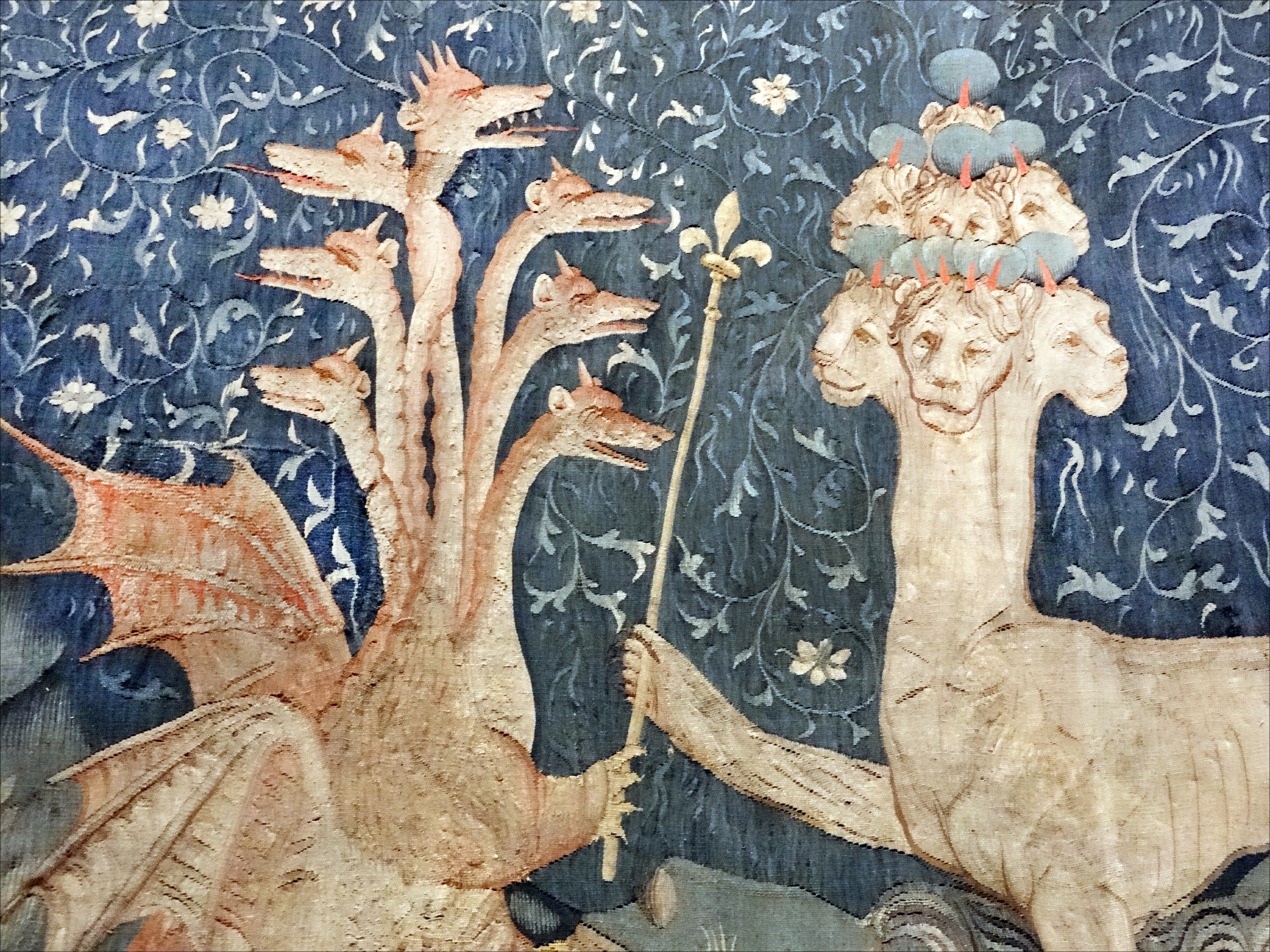
Satan (the dragon; on the left) gives to the beast of the sea (on the right) power represented by a sceptre in a detail of panel III.40 of the medieval French Apocalypse Tapestry, produced between 1377 and 1382.

Cosmological dualism underwent a revival in the 12th century by through Catharism, probably influenced by Bogomilism in the 10th century. What is known of the Cathars largely comes in what is preserved by the critics in the Catholic Church which later destroyed them in the Albigensian Crusade. Alain de Lille, c. 1195, accused the Cathars of believing in two gods, one of light and one of darkness. Durand de Huesca, responding to a Cathar tract c. 1220 indicates that they regarded the physical world as the creation of Satan. In the Gospel of the Secret Supper, Lucifer, just as in prior Gnostic systems, appears as an evil demiurge, who created the material world and traps souls inside. Bogomilism owed many ideas to the earlier Paulicians in Armenia and the Near East and had strong impact on the history of the Balkans. Their true origin probably lies within earlier sects such as Nestorianism, Marcionism and Borboritism, who all share the notion of a docetic Jesus. Like these earlier movements, Bogomilites agree upon a dualism between body and soul, matter and spirit, and a struggle between good and evil. The Catholic church sanctioned dualistic teachings in the Fourth Council of the Lateran (1215), by affirming that God created everything from nothing; that the devil and his demons were created good, but turned evil by their own will; that humans yielded to the devil's temptations, thus falling into sin; and that, after Resurrection, the damned will suffer along with the devil, while the saved enjoy eternity with Christ. Only a few theologians from the University of Paris, in 1241, proposed the contrary assertion, that God created the devil without his own decision.

After the collapse of the Ottoman Empire, parts of Bogomil Dualism remained in Balkan folklore concerning creation: according to a story, dated back to the eleventh to thirteenth century, before God created the world, he meets a goose on the eternal ocean. The name of the Goose is reportedly Satanael and it claims to be a god. When God asks Satanael who he is, the devil answers "the god of gods". God requests that the devil then dive to the bottom of the sea to carry some mud, and from this mud, they fashioned the world. God created his fiery angels from the right part of a flint rock, and the Devil created his demons from the left part of the flint. Later, the devil tries to assault God but is thrown into the abyss. He remains lurking on the creation of God and planning another attack on heaven. This myth shares some resemblance with Pre-Islamic Turkic creation myths as well as Bogomilite thoughts.

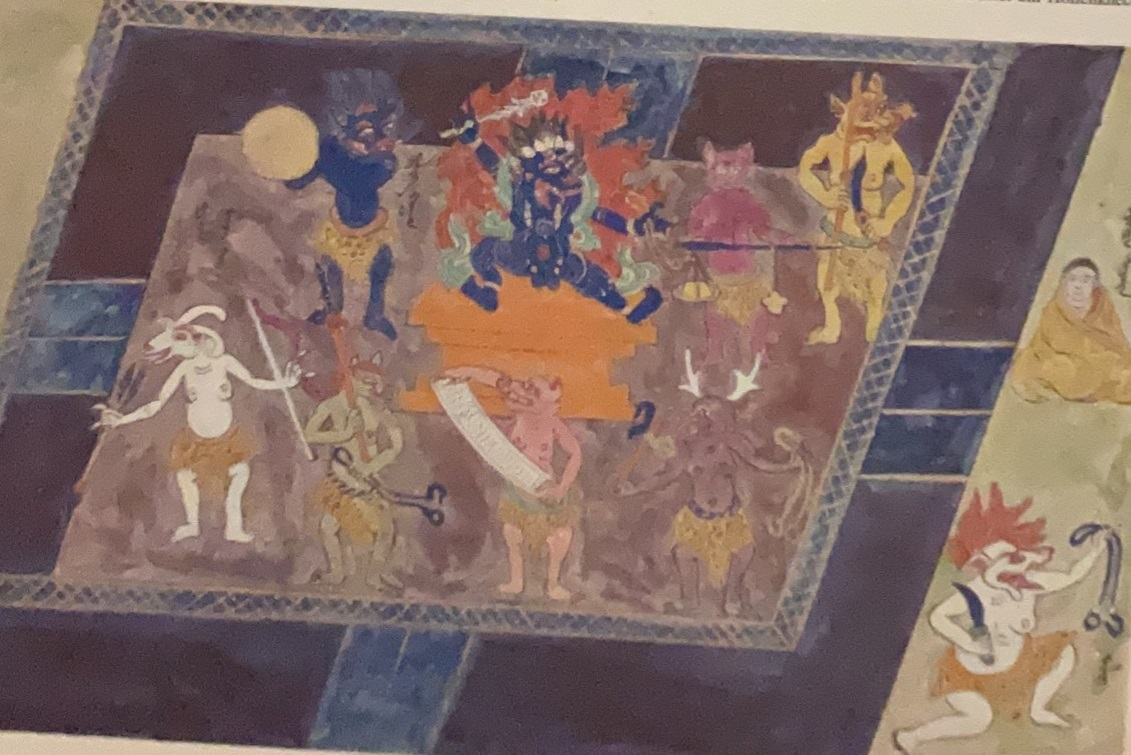
The city of the infernal king and god of death Erlik-Khan, precedes court over the souls of the dead. In front of him, a hell-being is reading the scrolls of sins and virtues.

The story bears resemblance to other Turko-Mongolian cosmogonies. According to one myth found among the Siberian Tatars, God and his first creation are envisaged in the form of ducks. God asks his creature and companion to dive into the ocean to retrieve some earth. However, the second duck, identified with Erlik Khan, turns against God and becomes his rival. A similar legend is recorded among the Altai Turks. Erlik and God swam together over the primordial waters. When God was about to create the Earth, he sent Erlik to dive into the waters and collect some mud. Erlik hid some inside his mouth to later create his own world. But when God commanded the Earth to expand, Erlik got troubled by the mud in his mouth. God aided Erlik to spit it out. The mud carried by Erlik gave place to the unpleasant areas of the world. Because of his sin, he was assigned to evil. Since he claimed equality with God by creating his own world, God punishes Erlik Khan, by granting him his own kingdom in the Underworld. In one variant, recorded by Verbitsky Vasily, not only Erlik Khan, but also the spirits he created, were banished form the heavens and cast down to the lower realms.

== By religion ==
=== Abrahamic religions ===
==== Christianity ====
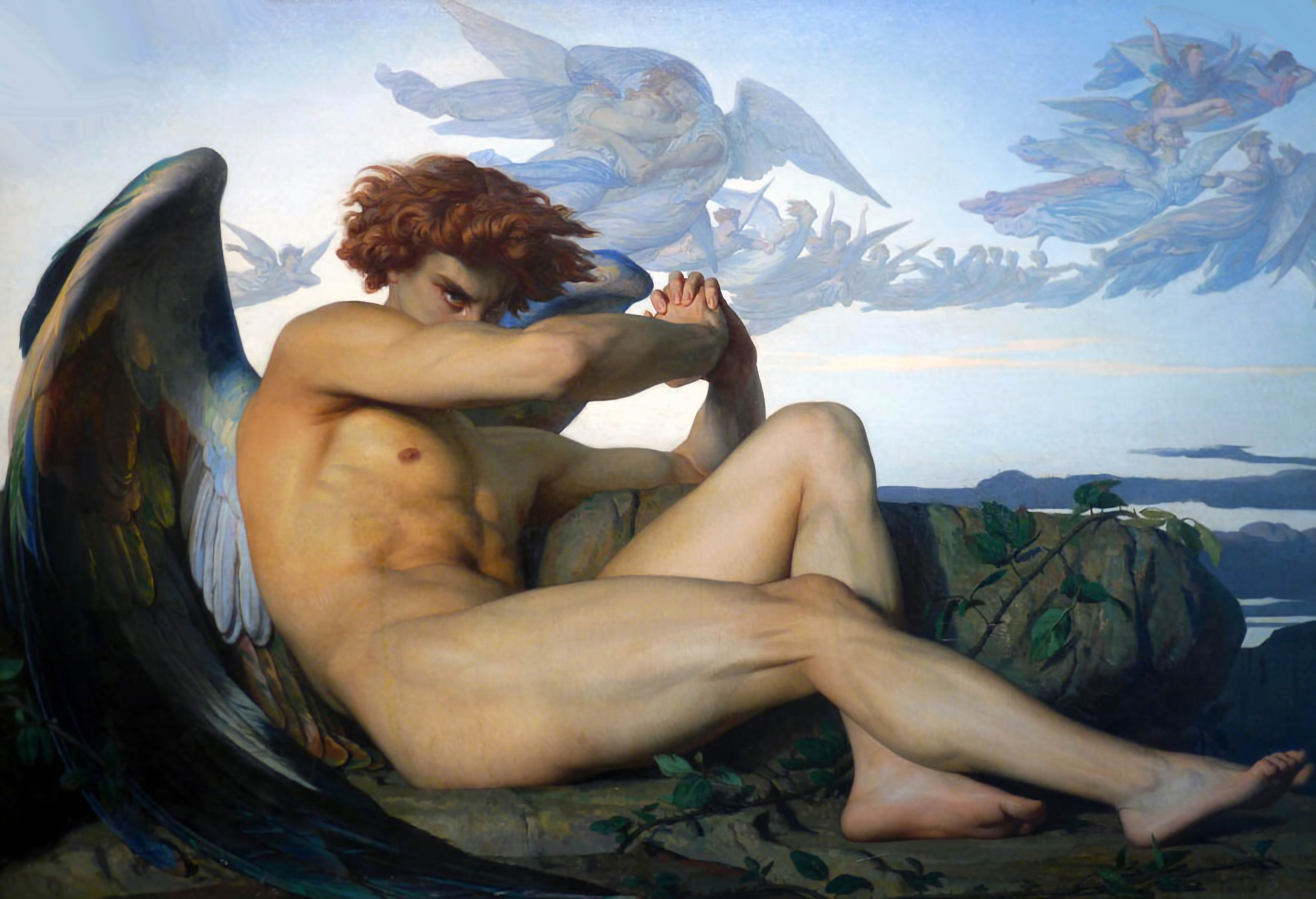
The Fallen Angel (1847) by Alexandre Cabanel

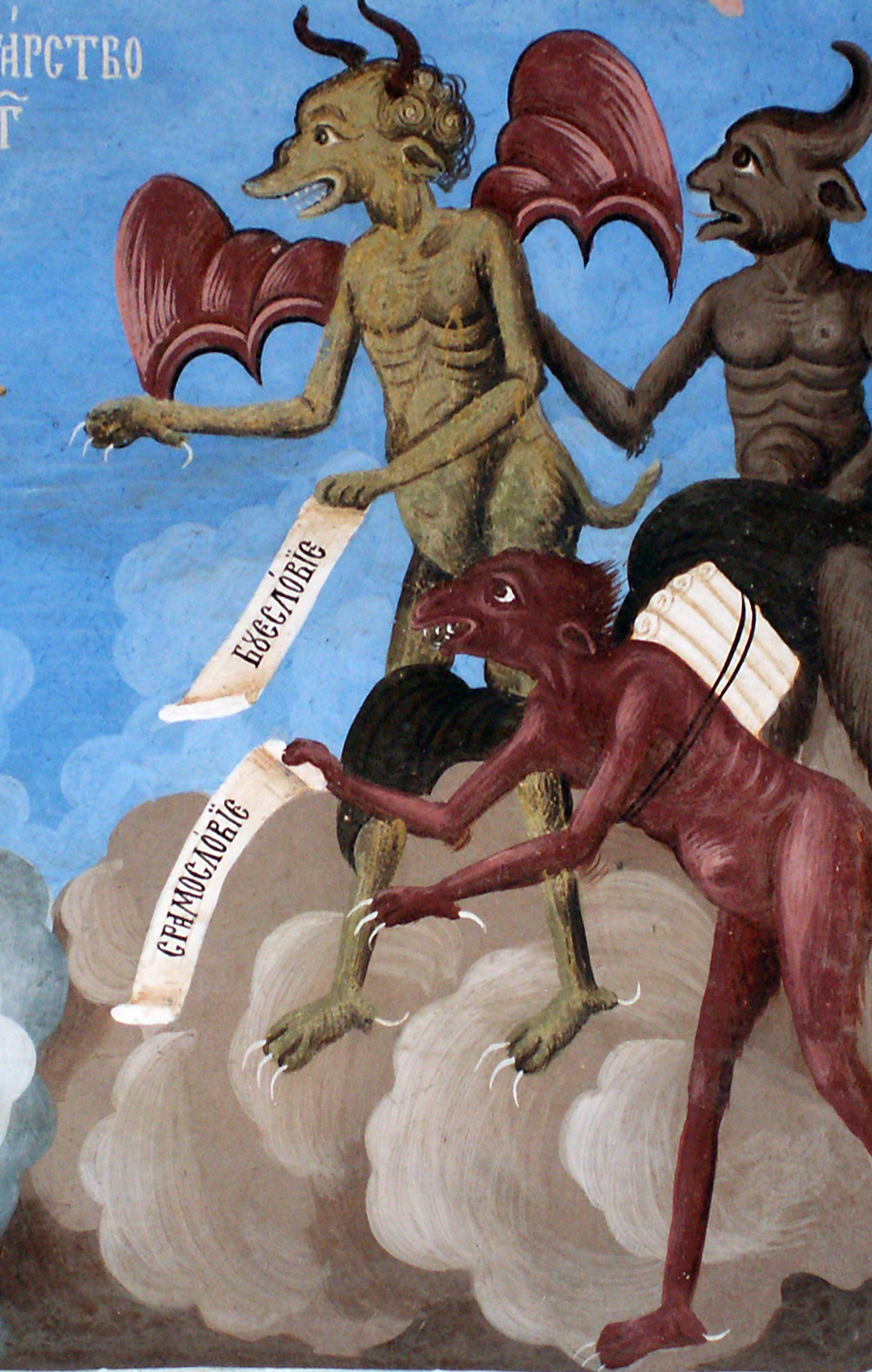
A fresco detail from the Rila Monastery, in which demons are depicted as having grotesque faces and bodies

In Christianity, the devil or Satan is a fallen angel who is the primary opponent of God. Some Christians also considered the Roman and Greek deities to be devils.

Christianity describes Satan as a fallen angel who terrorizes the world through evil, is opposed to truth, and shall be condemned, together with the fallen angels who follow him, to eternal fire at the Last Judgment.

Christian Bible

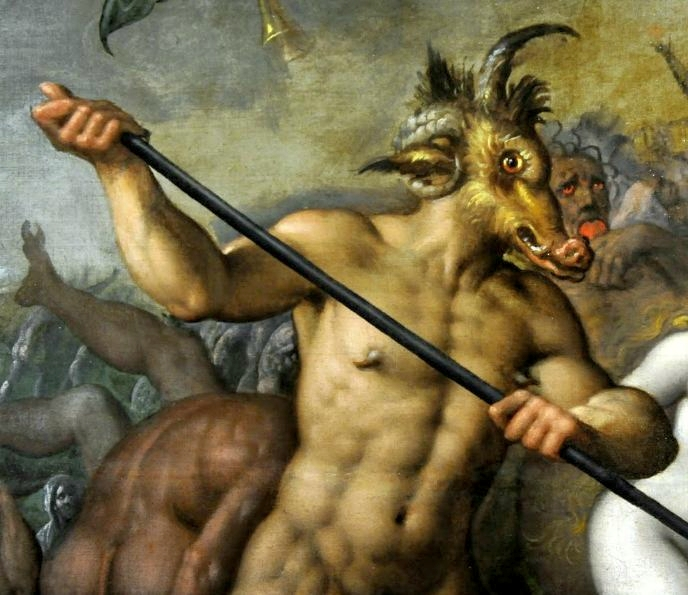
Horns of a goat and a ram, goat's fur and ears, nose and canines of a pig; a typical depiction of the devil in Christian art. The goat, ram and pig are consistently associated with the devil. Detail of a 16th-century painting by Jacob de Backer in the National Museum in Warsaw.

The Devil is identified with several figures in the Bible including the serpent in the Garden of Eden, Lucifer, Satan, the tempter of the Gospels, Leviathan, and the dragon in the Book of Revelation. Some parts of the Bible, which do not refer to an evil spirit or Satan at the time of the composition of the texts, are interpreted as references to the Devil in Christian tradition. During the Enlighment, thinkers attempted to exclude the Devil from Christian consciousness, regarding it as a creation of medieval fantasy. Genesis 3 mentions the serpent in the Garden of Eden, which tempts Adam and Eve into eating the forbidden fruit from the tree of the knowledge of good and evil, thus causing their expulsion from the Garden. The Babylonian myth of a rising star, as the embodiment of a heavenly being who is thrown down for his attempt to ascend into the higher planes of the gods, is also found in the Bible and interpreted as a fallen angel (Isaiah 14:12–15).

Ezekiel's cherub in Eden is thought to be a description of the major characteristic of the Devil, that he was created good, as a high ranking angel and lived in Eden, later turning evil on his own accord:

You were in Eden, the garden of God; every precious stone adorned you: ruby, topaz, emerald, chrysolite, onyx, jasper, sapphire, turquoise, and beryl. Gold work of tambourines and of pipes was in you. In the day that you were created they were prepared. You were the anointed cherub who covers: and I set you, so that you were on the holy mountain of God; you have walked up and down in the midst of the stones of fire. You were perfect in your ways from the day that you were created, until unrighteousness was found in you.

— Ezekiel 28:13–15

The Hebrew term śāṭān (Hebrew: שָּׂטָן) was originally a common noun meaning "accuser" or "adversary" and derived from a verb meaning primarily "to obstruct, oppose". Satan is conceptualized as a heavenly being hostile to humans and a personification of evil 18 times in Job 1–2 and Zechariah 3. In the Book of Job, Job is a righteous man favored by God. Job 1:6–8 describes the "sons of God" (bənê hā'ĕlōhîm) presenting themselves before God. Satan thinks Job only loves God because he has been blessed, so he requests that God tests the sincerity of Job's love for God through suffering, expecting Job to abandon his faith. God consents; Satan destroys Job's family, health, servants and flocks, yet Job refuses to condemn God.

The Devil figures much more prominently in the New Testament and in Christian theology than in the Old Testament. The Devil is a unique entity throughout the New Testament, neither identical to the demons nor the fallen angels, the tempter and perhaps rules over the kingdoms of earth. In the temptation of Christ (Matthew 4:8–9 and Luke 4:6–7), the devil offers all kingdoms of the earth to Jesus, implying they belong to him. Since Jesus does not dispute this offer, it may indicate that the authors of those gospels believed this to be true. This event is described in all three synoptic gospels, (Matthew 4:1–11, Mark 1:12–13 and Luke 4:1–13). Some Church Fathers, such as Irenaeus, reject that the Devil holds such power, arguing that, since the devil was a liar since the beginning, he also lied here and that all kingdoms belong to God, referring to Proverbs 21.

Adversaries of Jesus are suggested to be under the influence of the Devil. John 8:40 speaks about the Pharisees as the "offspring of the devil". John 13:2 states that the Devil entered Judas Iscariot before Judas's betrayal (Luke 22:3). In all three synoptic gospels (Matthew 9:22–29, Mark 3:22–30 and Luke 11:14–20), Jesus himself is also accused of serving the Devil. Jesus's adversaries claim that he receives the power to cast out demons from Beelzebub, the Devil. In response, Jesus says that a house divided against itself will fall, and that there would be no reason for the devil to allow one to defeat the devil's works with his own power.

According to the First Epistle of Peter, "Like a roaring lion your adversary the devil prowls around, looking for someone to devour" (1 Peter 5:8). The authors of the Second Epistle of Peter and the Epistle of Jude believe that God prepares judgment for the devil and his fellow fallen angels, who are bound in darkness until the Divine retribution. In the Epistle to the Romans, the inspirer of sin is also implied to be the author of death. The Epistle to the Hebrews speaks of the devil as the one who has the power of death but is defeated through the death of Jesus (Hebrews 2:14). In the Second Epistle to the Corinthians, Paul the Apostle warns that Satan is often disguised as an angel of light.

In the Book of Revelation, a dragon/serpent "called the devil, or Satan" wages war against the archangel Michael resulting in the dragon's fall. The devil is described with features similar to primordial chaos monsters, like the Leviathan in the Old Testament. The identification of this serpent as Satan supports identification of the serpent in Genesis with the devil.

Theology

In Christian theology the Devil is the personification of evil, traditionally held to have rebelled against God in an attempt to become equal to God himself. (Note: "By desiring to be equal to God in his arrogance, Lucifer abolishes the difference between God and the angels created by him and thus calls the entire system of order into question (if he were instead to replace God, the system itself would only be preserved with reversed positions)".) He is said to be a fallen angel, who was expelled from Heaven at the beginning of time, before God created the material world, and is in constant opposition to God.

Many scholars explain the Devil's fall from God's grace in Neoplatonic fashion. According to Origen, God created rational creatures first then the material world. The rational creatures are divided into angels and humans, both endowed with free will, and the material world is a result of their evil choices. Therefore, the Devil is considered most remote from the presence of God, and those who adhere to the Devil's will follow the Devil's removal from God's presence. Similar, Pseudo-Dionysius the Areopagite considers evil as a deficiency having no real ontological existence. Thus the Devil is conceptualized as the entity most remote from God. Dante Alighieri's Inferno follows a similar portrayal of the Devil by placing him at the bottom of hell where he becomes the center of the material and sinful world to which all sinfulness is drawn.

From the beginning of the early modern period (around the 1400s), Christians started to imagine the Devil as an increasingly powerful entity, actively leading people into falsehood. For Martin Luther the Devil was not a deficit of good, but a real, personal and powerful entity, with a presumptuous will against God, his word and his creation. Luther lists several hosts of greater and lesser devils. Greater devils would incite to greater sins, like unbelief and heresy, while lesser devils to minor sins like greed and fornication. Among these devils also appears Asmodeus known from the Book of Tobit. (Note: "The reformer interprets the book of Tobit as a drama in which Asmodeus is up to mischief as a house devil.") These anthropomorphic devils are used as stylistic devices for his audience, although Luther regards them as different manifestations of one spirit (i.e. the Devil). (Note: "Thus Luther's use of individual specific devils is explained by the need to present his thoughts in a manner that is reasonable and understandable for the masses of his contemporaries.")

Others rejected that the Devil has any independent reality on his own. David Joris was the first of the Anabaptists to suggest the Devil was only an allegory (c. 1540); this view found a small but persistent following in the Netherlands. The Devil as a fallen angel symbolized Adam's fall from God's grace and Satan represented a power within man. Rudolf Bultmann taught that Christians need to reject belief in a literal devil as part of formulating an authentic faith in today's world.

==== Gnosticism ====
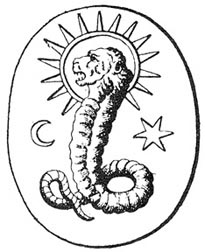
A lion-faced deity found on a Gnostic gem in Bernard de Montfaucon's L'antiquité expliquée et représentée en figures, a depiction of Yaldabaoth.

Gnostic and Gnostic-influenced religions postulate the idea that the material world is inherently evil. The One true God is remote, beyond the material universe; therefore, this universe must be governed by an inferior imposter deity. This deity was identified with the deity of the Old Testament by some sects, such as the Sethians and the Marcions. Tertullian accuses Marcion of Sinope, that he

[held that] the Old Testament was a scandal to the faithful ... and ... accounted for it by postulating [that Jehovah was] a secondary deity, a demiurgus, who was god, in a sense, but not the supreme God; he was just, rigidly just, he had his good qualities, but he was not the good god, who was Father of Our Lord Jesus Christ.

John Arendzen (1909) in the Catholic Encyclopedia (1913) mentions that Eusebius accused Apelles, the 2nd-century AD Gnostic, of considering the Inspirer of Old Testament prophecies to be not a god, but an evil angel. These writings commonly refer to the Creator of the material world as "a demiurgus" to distinguish him from the One true God. Some texts, such as the Apocryphon of John and On the Origin of the World, not only demonized the Creator God but also called him by the name of the devil in some Jewish writings, Samael.

==== Islam ====
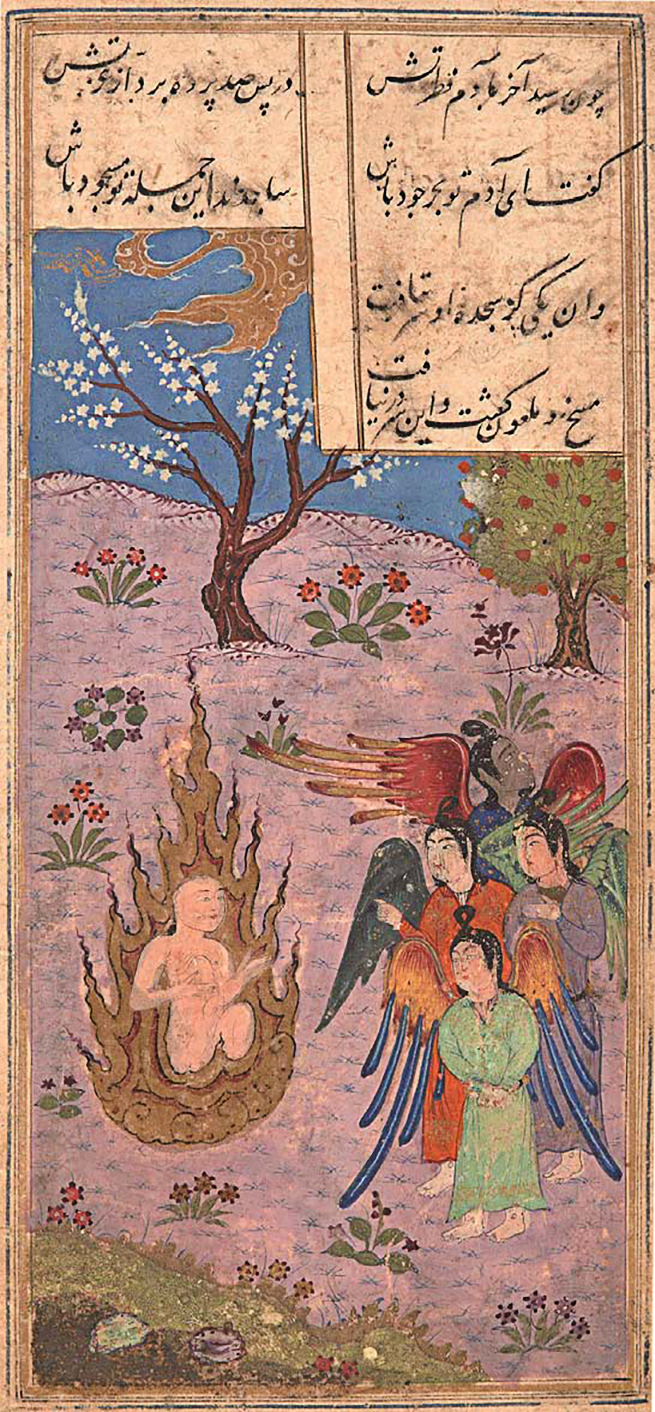
Iblīs while he is still a beautiful angel called ʿAzāzīl. The darker color of his appearance denotes his impending fall, while he still carries the wings of an angel and wears the contemporary ‘angelic hairstyle,’.

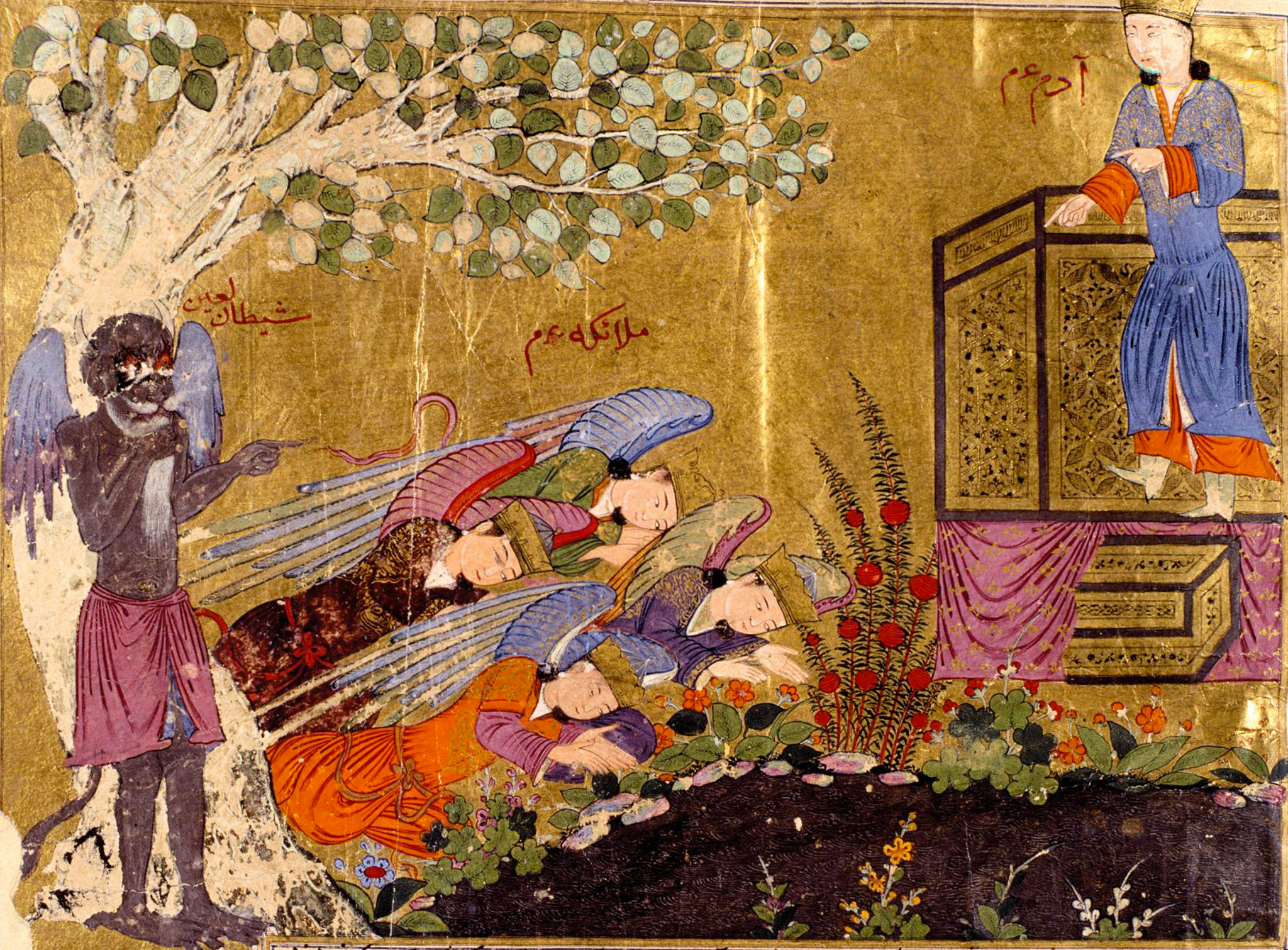
The angels honor the newly created Adam, however Iblis refuses and turns from an angel into a demon. During the process, his wings burn up, horns grow out of his head, and his body transforms into disfigurative proportions. Painting from a illustrated subsection containing Bal'ami's Persian rendition of the Annals in a much larger Herat manuscript.

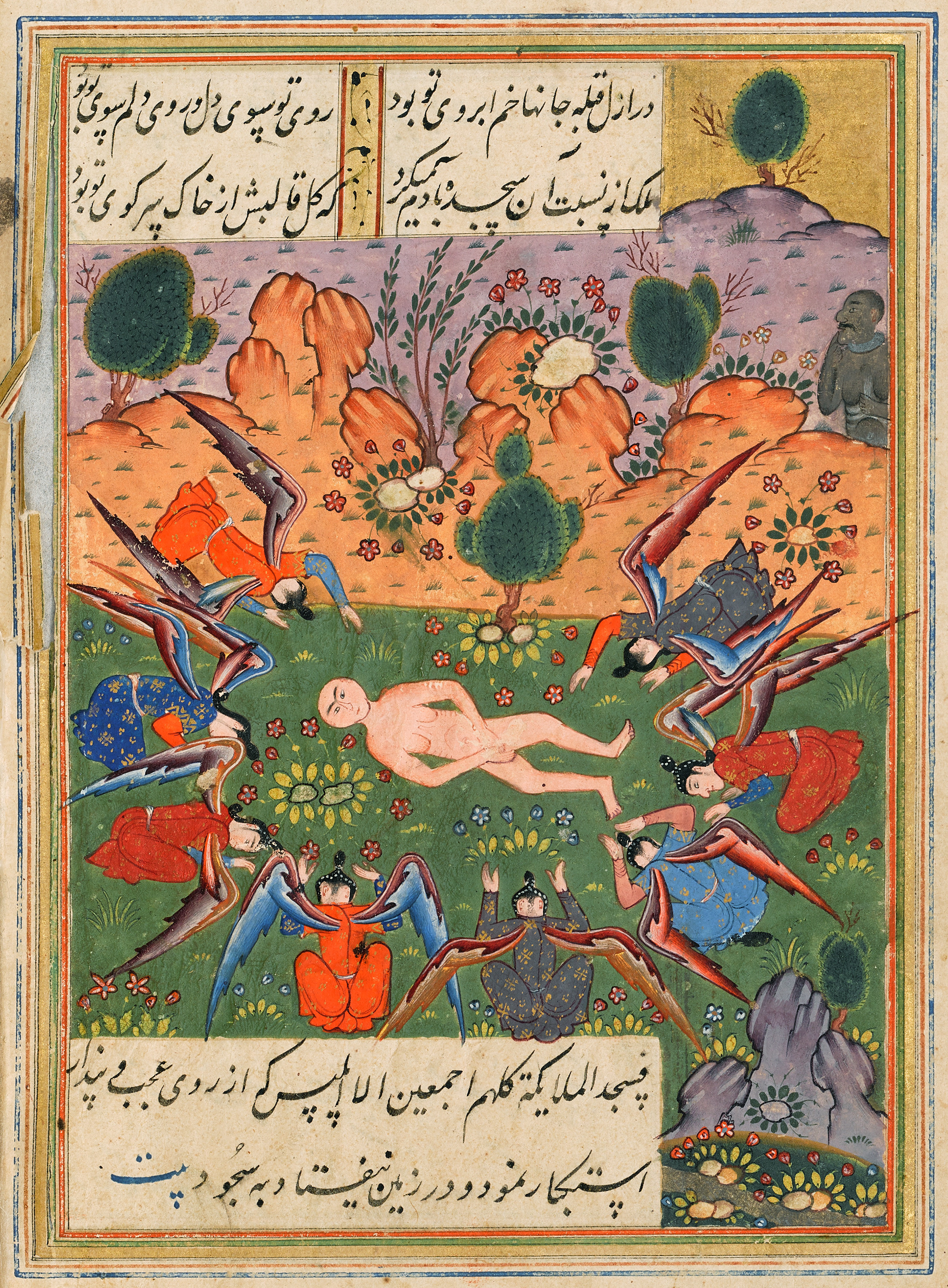
Adam is created and the angels are commanded to prostrate themselves before him. Iblis (top right on the picture) refuses to prostrate before the newly created Adam from a Persian miniature.

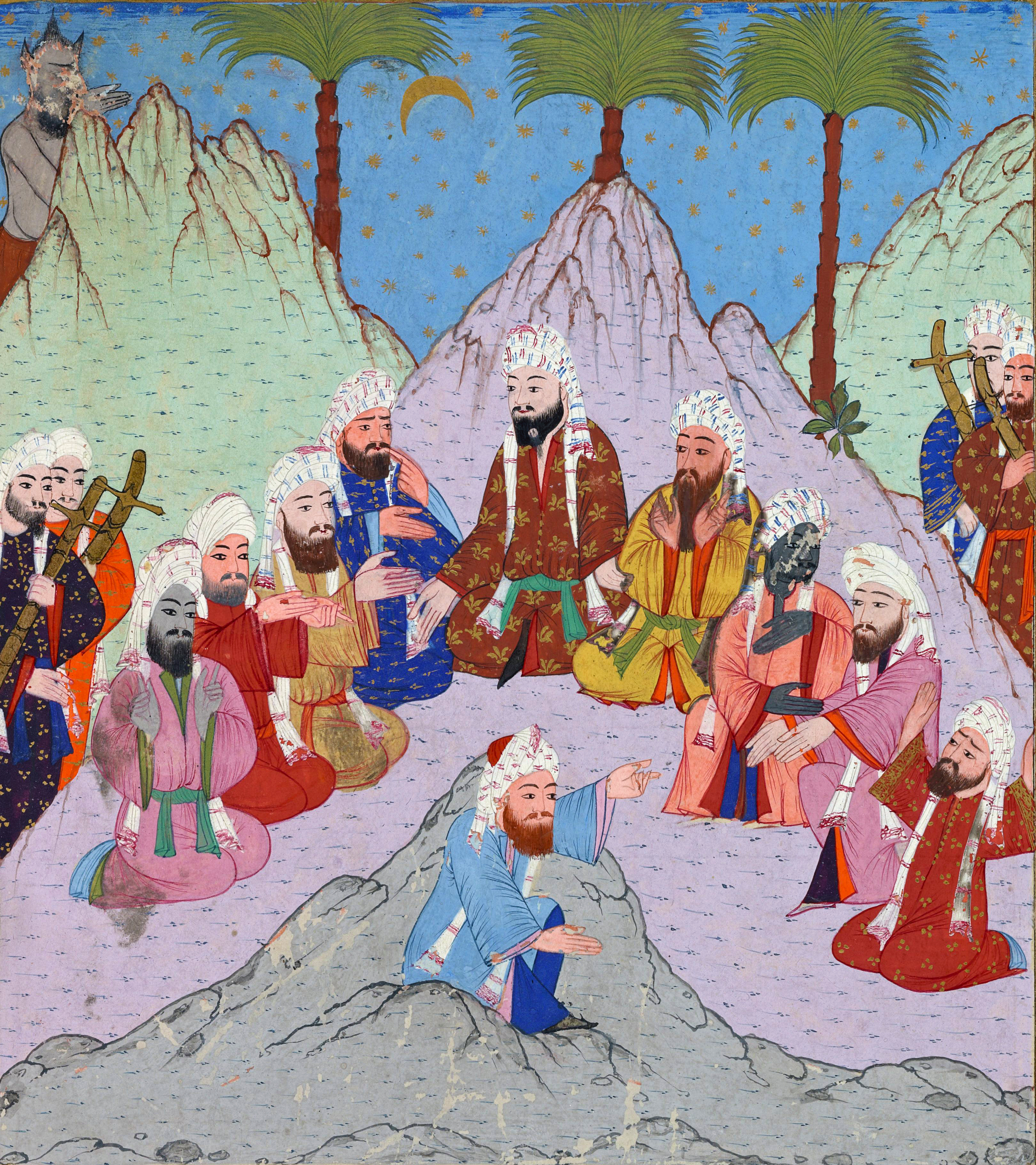
Islamic miniature of Iblis (top-left), in the form of a demon, tempts the Quraysh leaders discussing the second pledge at al-Aqabah and the anti-Islamic zealot spying on them, in an attempt to stop the mission of the prophet Muhammad and the spread of Islam.

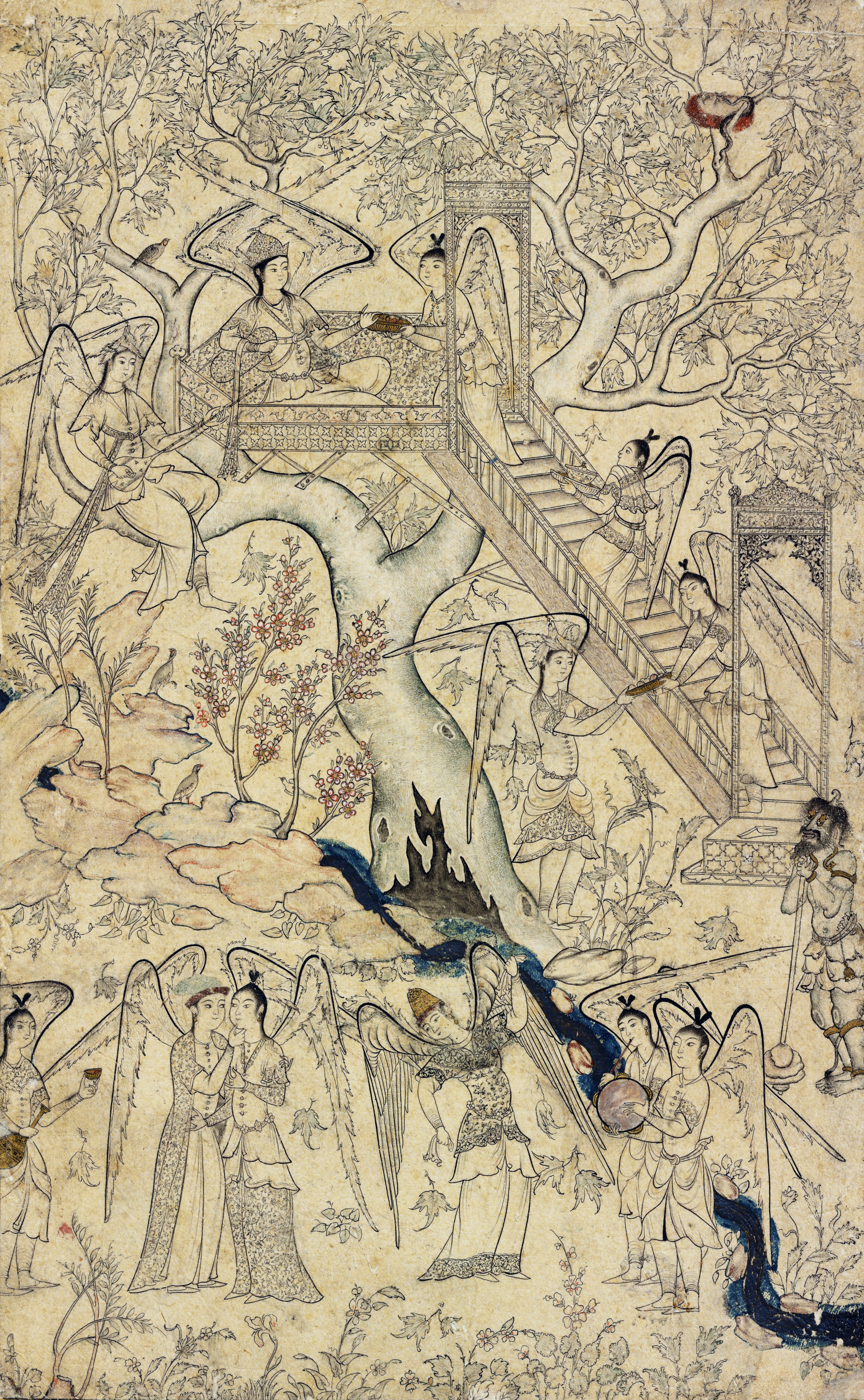
Iblis (centre-right), in the form of an hell-angel, guards the entrance to the paradisical garden, in order to prevent those who succumb to earthly urges from entering.

In Islam, the principle of evil is expressed by two terms referring to the same entity: Shaitan (meaning astray, distant or devil) and Iblis. Iblis is the proper name of the devil representing the characteristics of evil. According to the Quran, Iblis is "one of the jinn", which can refer to all sorts of invisible beings, including angels, demons, spirits, and devils. The early-Modern scholar Mahmud al-Alusi (1802 – 29 July 1854 CE) summarizes viewpoints regarding the nature of the Devil prevailing throughout pre-Modern times:

- the Devil was an earthly angel sent to fight the jinn. Unlike the celestial angels, the earthly angels are not protected from sin.
- the angels took prisoners during their battle from among the spirits of the earth. They were brought up to heaven and served with the angels. These spirits have a malicious nature even though some of them might be good, and the Devil was one of these spirits but later disobeyed.
- originally, the Devil was a good angel, but then God stripped away the angelic qualities and exchanged them for satanic ones. Akin to the "fallen angel", the Devil turned from a beautiful being into a hideous demon. Unlike Christianity, the fall was initiated by Gods decree.
- the Devil is one of the archangels, and the archangels are all manifestations of a set of God's names. They convey God's will to the earthly world. The Devil is responsible for manifesting God's "majestic attributes", such as "the domineering", "the haughty", or "the misguider" and follows necessarily from God's nature.

Iblis is mentioned in the Quranic narrative about the creation of humanity. When God created Adam, he ordered the angels to prostrate themselves before him. Out of pride, Iblis refused and claimed to be superior to Adam.^{[Quran 7:12]} Therefore, pride but also envy became a sign of "unbelief" in Islam. Thereafter, Iblis was condemned to Hell, but God granted him a request to lead humanity astray, knowing the righteous would resist Iblis's attempts to misguide them. In Islam, both good and evil are ultimately created by God. But since God's will is good, the evil in the world must be part of God's plan.

God allowed the Devil to seduce humanity. Evil and suffering are regarded as a test or a chance to prove confidence in God. Some philosophers and mystics emphasized Iblis himself as a role model of confidence in God. Because God ordered the angels to prostrate themselves, Iblis was forced to choose between God's command and God's will (not to praise someone other than God). He successfully passed the test, yet his disobedience caused his punishment and therefore suffering. However, he stays patient and is rewarded in the end.

Although Iblis is often compared to the devil in Christian theology, Islam rejects the idea that Satan is an opponent of God and the implied struggle between God and the devil. One of the major concerns for Medieval Muslim scholars was to disprove the claims by the Manichaeism that good comes from God and evil comes from the Devil. The Hanbalite scholar Al-Jawzī comments on Surah 37:158, which states "And they imagine kinship between him and the jinn, whereas the jinn know well that they will be brought before (Him)." what it also refers to a rejection of dualistic beliefs:

حدها: أنهم قالوا: هو وإِبليس أخَوان، رواه العوفي عن ابن عباس؛ قال الماوردي: وهو قول الزنادقة والذين يقولون: الخير مِنَ الله، والشَّرُّ من إِبليس.

One of them [the heretics] is that they said: He and Iblis are brothers. This was narrated by Al-Awfi on the authority of Ibn Abbas. Al-Mawardi said: This is the saying of the heretics [Manichaeans] and those who say: Good is from God, and evil is from Iblis.

Iblis might either be regarded as the most monotheistic or the greatest sinner, but remains only a creature of God. Iblis did not become an unbeliever due to his disobedience, but because of attributing injustice to God; that is, by asserting that the command to prostrate himself before Adam was inappropriate. There is no reference to angelic revolt in the Quran and no mention of Iblis trying to take God's throne, and Iblis's sin could be forgiven at any time by God. According to the Quran, Iblis's disobedience was due to his disdain for humanity, a narrative already occurring in early New Testament apocrypha.

As in Christianity, Iblis was once a pious creature of God but later cast out of Heaven due to his pride. However, to maintain God's absolute sovereignty, Islam matches the line taken by Irenaeus instead of the later Christian consensus that the devil did not rebel against God but against humanity. Further, although Iblis is generally regarded as a real bodily entity, he plays a less significant role as the personification of evil than in Christianity. Iblis is merely a tempter, notable for inciting humans into sin by whispering into humans minds (waswās), akin to the Jewish idea of the devil as yetzer hara.

On the other hand, Shaitan refers unilaterally to forces of evil, including the Devil Iblis who causes mischief. In the plural (shayāṭīn) refers to any set of attributes of the Devil manifesting in evil spirits (jinn) or shape (ins).

Shaitan mostly operates on the mind and is thus linked to humans' psychological nature, appearing in dreams, causing anger, or interrupting the mental preparation for prayer. Furthermore, the term Shaitan also refers to beings who follow the evil suggestions of Iblis. Also, the principle of shaitan is in many ways a symbol of spiritual impurity, representing humans' own deficits, in contrast to a "true Muslim", who is free from anger, lust and other devilish desires.

In Muslim culture, devils are believed to be hermaphrodite creatures created from hell-fire, with one male and one female thigh, and able to procreate without a mate. It is generally believed that devils can harm the souls of humans through their whisperings. While whisperings tempt humans to sin, the devils might enter the hearth (qalb) of an individual. If the devils take over the soul of a person, this would render them aggressive or insane. In extreme cases, the alterings of the soul are believed to have effect on the body, matching its spiritual qualities.

Sunni Islam

Islamic theology (kalam) does not discuss the role of Iblis in as much as related to angels and demons (jinn and shayāṭīn), but rather in his role as the principle of evil. One major concern of Muslim theologians was to disprove cosmological dualism, the idea that the Devil partakes in the creation of the world, i.e. that God creates goodness and the Devil creates evil. According to Sunni creed, God is the originator of both good and evil. Thus, the Devil, as embodiment of evil, is an example on the fate of the disbelievers (kuffār), rather than an independent principle. Like Iblis, disbelievers are also held to be misguided by God, for, as it has been demonstrated in the case of Iblis, belief and unbelief depend on God's will not on the individual.

It further shows that the blessed can become damned and the damned become blessed, as Iblis, when he was the leader of the angels, was happy, but miserable after his fall. Abu Sufyan ibn Harb is the opposite example, someone who was miserable but then became blessed once he became a Muslim. The principle Devil also demonstrates that disobedience does not equal unbelief because Iblis became an unbeliever due to his arrogance and will to follow his own desires rather than loving God.

Sufism

In contrast to Occidental philosophy, the Sufi idea of seeing "Many as One" and considering the creation in its essence as the Absolute, leads to the idea of the dissolution of any dualism between the ego substance and the "external" substantial objects. The rebellion against God, mentioned in the Quran, takes place on the level of the psyche that must be trained and disciplined for its union with the spirit that is pure. Since psyche drives the body, flesh is not the obstacle to humans but rather an unawareness that allows the impulsive forces to cause rebellion against God on the level of the psyche. Yet it is not a dualism between body, psyche and spirit, since the spirit embraces both psyche and corporeal aspects of humanity. The Qur‘anic iteration of the story of the Garden of Eden, prompted Sufi authors to view aspirations to a state of no-passion (of an angelic state as valued in some Christian circles) as satanic temptation.

Since the world is held to be the mirror in which God's attributes are reflected, participation in worldly affairs is not necessarily seen as opposed to God. The devil activates the selfish desires of the psyche, leading the human astray from the Divine. Thus, it is the I that is regarded as evil, and both Iblis and Pharao are present as symbols for uttering "I" in ones own behavior. Therefore, it is recommended to use the term I as little as possible. It is only God who has the right to say "I", since it is only God who is self-subsistent. Uttering "I" is therefore a way to compare oneself to God, regarded as shirk.

Islamist movements

Many Salafi strands, post-colonial reform movements within Islam, emphasize a dualistic worldview between believers and unbelievers, The unbelievers are considered to be under the domain of the Devil and are the enemies of the faithful. The former are credited with tempting the latter to sin and away from God's path. The Devil will ultimately be defeated by the power of God, but remains until then a serious threat for the believer.

The notion of a substantial reality of evil (or a form of dualism between God and the Devil) has no precedence in the Quran or earlier Muslim traditions. The writings of ibn Sina, Ghazali, and ibn Taimiyya, all describe evil as the absence of good, rather than having any positive existence. Accordingly, infidelity among humans, civilizations, and empires are not described as evil or devilish in Classical Islamic sources. This is in stark contrast to Islamists, such as Osama bin Laden, who justifies his violence against the infidels by contrary assertions.

While in classical hadiths, devils (shayāṭīn) and jinn are responsible for ritual impurity, many Salafis substitute local demons by an omnipresent threat through the Devil himself. Only through remembrance of God and ritual purity, can the devil be kept away. As such, the Devil becomes an increasingly powerful entity who is believed to interfere with both personal and political life. For example, many Salafis blame the Devil for Western emancipation.

==== Judaism ====
Yahweh, the god in pre-exilic Judaism, created both good and evil, as stated in Isaiah 45:7: "I form the light, and create darkness: I make peace, and create evil: I the Lord do all these things." The Devil does not exist in Jewish scriptures. Satan, who will later become a representative for the Devil in Christian tradition, is not yet the Devil. The Hebrew term śāṭān (Hebrew: שָּׂטָן), meaning "accuser" or "adversary", was applied to both human and heavenly adversaries. However, even when the term is referring to a supernatural adversary, such as in Numbers 22:22 and in Job 1–2, Satan is merely one "of the Sons of God", a manifestation of God's will.

Under influence of Zoroastrianism during the Achaemenid Empire, which introduced the idea of Evil as a separate principle into the Jewish belief system, Satan gradually developed into an independent principle, abolishing the Godhead from evil actions. In the Book of Jubilees, the evil angel Mastema substitutes deprecated actions of Yahweh. Nonetheless, Mastema can only act with God's permission and only succeeds when attacking non-Jewish nations.

In the Book of Enoch, there is an entire class of angels called satans. According to Jeffrey Burton Russell, Satan is yet another name for Azazel, the leader of the rebel angel of the story. Derek R. Brown argues that here, the Devil and the satans are still distinct: while Azazel and his angels rebel against God, the satans act on God's behalf as God's executioners of Divine Judgement. The fallen angels are blamed for introducing the forbidden arts of war into the world and sire demonic offspring with human women. By ascribing the origin of evil to angels acting from God independently, evil is attributed to something supernatural from without; external to the prevailing belief-system. Due to resemblance of the fallen angels with creatures of Greek mythology, the fallen angels might be a reaction invading Hellenistic culture, resulting in perceived oppression of the Jews.

The story of fallen angels, proposing a second independent power in heaven, was at odds with later Rabbinic Judaism. Therefore, the Book of Enoch, which depicted the evil as an independent force besides God were rejected. After the apocalyptic period, references to Satan in the Tanakh are thought to be allegorical.

==== Mandaeism ====
In Mandaean mythology, Ruha fell apart from the World of Light and became the queen of the World of Darkness, also referred to as Sheol. She is considered evil and a liar, sorcerer and seductress.She gives birth to Ur, also referred to as Leviathan. He is portrayed as a large, ferocious dragon or snake and is considered the king of the World of Darkness. Together they rule the underworld and create the seven planets and twelve zodiac constellations. Also found in the underworld is Krun, the greatest of the five Mandaean Lords of the underworld. He dwells in the lowest depths of creation and his epithet is the 'mountain of flesh'. Prominent infernal beings found in the World of Darkness include lilith, nalai (vampire), niuli (hobgoblin), latabi (devil), gadalta (ghost), satani (Satan) and various other demons and evil spirits.

=== Buddhism ===
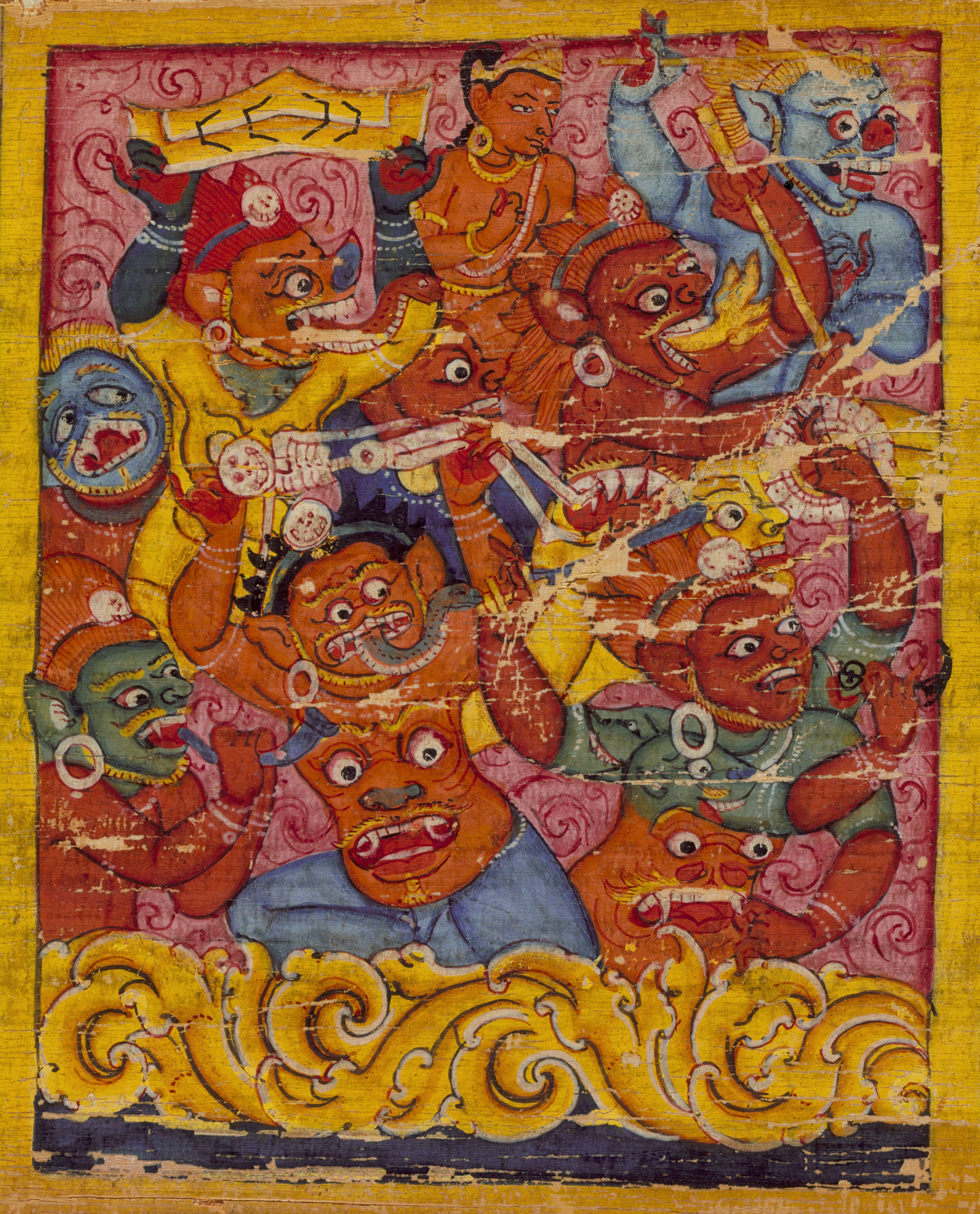
The demons of Mara, palm leaf manuscript, Nalanda, Bihar

Māra, a figure, generally representing evil in Buddhism, has often been compared to devil-figures, such as Satan of the Christian tradition. Like many Devils, Māra is associated with temptations, death, and suffering.

In the story of the Awakening of the Buddha, Māra appears as a powerful deva, trying to seduce him with his celestial army and a vision of beautiful maidens (accharā). The concept of Māra is not limited to one particular figure, but can refer to a wide-range of different figures who obstruct the way of nibbāna.In other iterations, Māra is inspired by Hindu myths about asuras, a class of titans or lesser deities.

In contrast to the devil figures across most Abrahamic religions however, Satan has been characterized as a rebel who undermines and perverts the good world created by an omnibenevolent God. In contrast, Māra is a symbol of the world and a representation of conditioned existence. Resistance of Māra's temptations is not found in a higher being, who is repeatedly presented as being suffering from the conditions set by Mara too (see: God(s) in Buddhism), but in enlightenment. An exception might be some forms of Eastern Sufism, where Iblīs (Islamic quivalent to Satan) bears some similar functions to Māra and submission to God is regarded as a form of annihilation of the self (fanāʾ).

=== Manichaeism ===
In Manichaeism, God and the devil are two unrelated principles. God created good and inhabits the realm of light, while the devil (also called the prince of darkness) created evil and inhabits the kingdom of darkness. The contemporary world came into existence, when the kingdom of darkness assaulted the kingdom of light and mingled with the spiritual world. At the end, the devil and his followers will be sealed forever and the kingdom of light and the kingdom of darkness will continue to co-exist eternally, never to commingle again.

Hegemonius (4th century CE) accuses that the Persian prophet Mani, founder of the Manichaean sect in the 3rd century CE, identified Jehovah as "the devil god which created the world" and said that "he who spoke with Moses, the Jews, and the priests ... is the [Prince] of Darkness, ... not the god of truth."

=== Yazidism ===
Dualism is rejected by Yazidis; according to Yazidism, evil is nonexistent and there is no entity that represents evil in opposition to God. Yazidis adhere to strict monism and are prohibited from uttering the word "devil" and from speaking of anything related to Hell.

=== Zoroastrianism ===
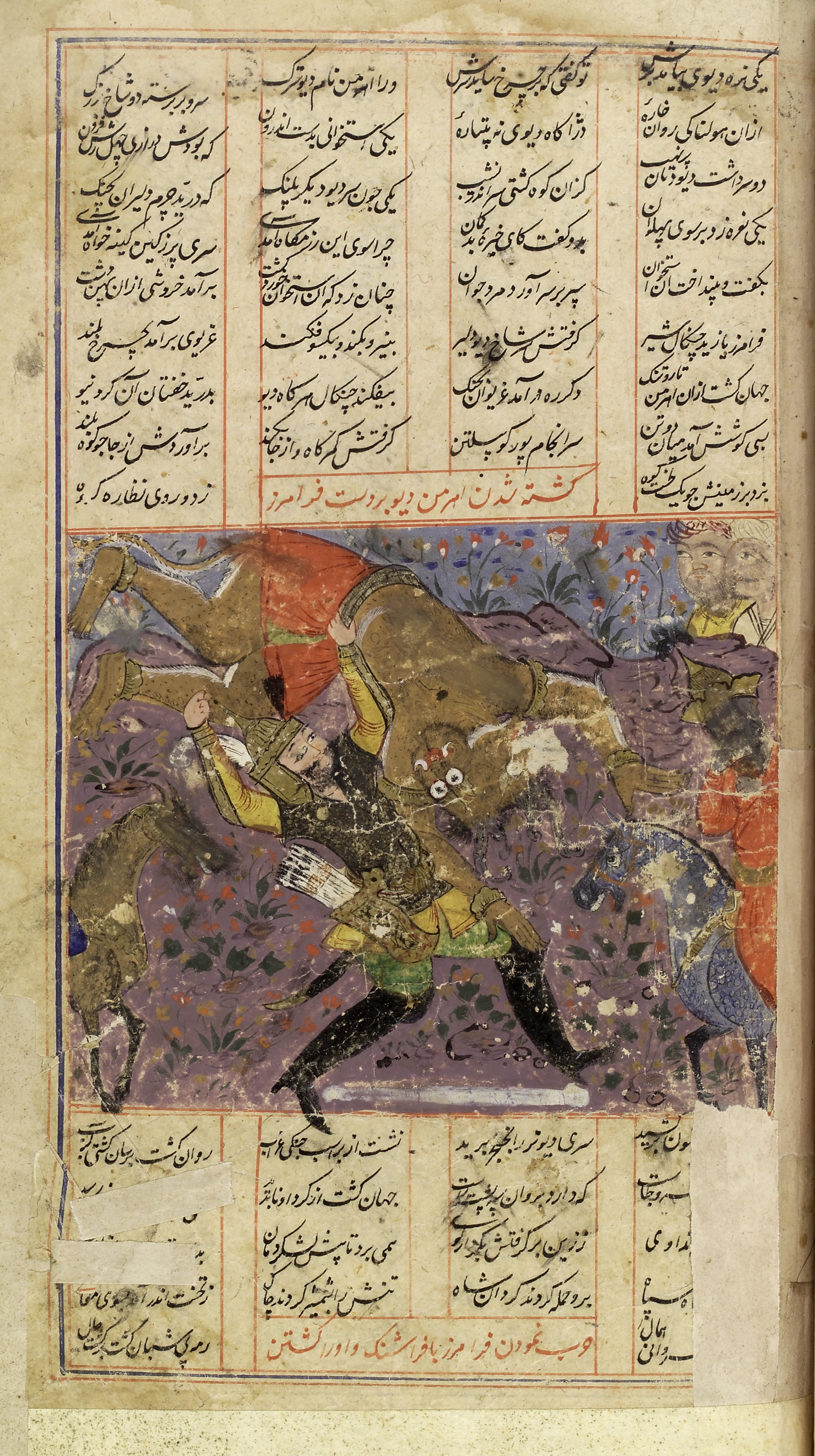
Ahriman Div being slain during a scene from the Shahnameh

Zoroastrianism probably introduced the first idea of the devil; a principle of evil independently existing apart from God. In Zoroastrianism, good and evil derive from two ultimately opposed forces. The force of good is called Ahura Mazda and the "destructive spirit" in the Avestan language is called Angra Mainyu. The Middle Persian equivalent is Ahriman. They are in eternal struggle and neither is all-powerful, especially Angra Mainyu is limited to space and time: in the end of time, he will be finally defeated. While Ahura Mazda creates what is good, Angra Mainyu is responsible for every evil and suffering in the world, such as toads and scorpions. Iranian Zoroastrians also considered the Daeva as devil creature, because of this in the Shahnameh, it is mentioned as both Ahriman Div (Persian: اهریمن دیو, romanized: Ahriman Div) as a devil.

=== Other names and conceptions ===
- Ash-Shaytan "Satan", the attributive Arabic term referring to the devil
- Angra Mainyu, Ahriman: "malign spirit", "unholy spirit"
- Dark lord
- Der Leibhaftige [Teufel] (in German): "[the devil] in the flesh, corporeal"
- Diabolus, Diabolos (Greek: Διάβολος), meaning "slanderer", as he lies about God to people and then turns them against one another, causing conflict and war.
- The Evil One
- The Father of Lies (John 8:44), in contrast to Jesus ("I am the truth").
- Iblis, name of the devil in Islam
- The Lord of the Underworld / Lord of Hell / Lord of this world
- Lucifer / the Morning Star (Greek and Roman): the bringer of light, illuminator; the planet Venus, often portrayed as Satan's name in Christianity
- Krampus, in the Tyrolean area also Tuifl
- Kölski (Iceland)
- Mephistopheles
- Old Scratch, the Stranger, Old Nick: a colloquialism for the devil, as indicated by the name of the character in the short story "The Devil and Tom Walker"
- Prince of darkness, the devil in Manichaeism
- Ruprecht (German form of Robert), a common name for the Devil in Germany (see Knecht Ruprecht (Knight Robert))
- Satan / the Adversary, Accuser, Prosecutor; in Christianity, the devil
- Sycophantes or Sycophant (Συκοφάντης), meaning "false accuser", for he falsely accused God when he claimed that God had prevented them from partaking of the tree, and he also spoke against Job.
- (The ancient/old/crooked/coiling) Serpent
- Voland (fictional character in The Master and Margarita)

== Sociologal and anthropological perspective ==
Social anthropologists have noted that Devils serve as symbol for whatever a particular communal in-group considers as "other", and represents the "other" in forms of demonic imagery, ugly, deformed, and disordered. By that, the in-group reifies group-identity and estaliblishes clear boundaries between themselves and the other.

Such Devils then occur in the form of Satan, Mara, Angra Manyu, Shaytan, the "mentally ill", etc. Elaine Pagels noted when writing on the social origin of Satan that:

Christians as they read the Gospels have characteristically identified themselves with the disciples, for some two thousand years they have also identified their opponents, whether Jews, pagans, or heretics, with forces of evil, and so with Satan.

== In moral philosophy ==
=== Spinoza ===
A non-published manuscript of Spinoza's Ethics contained a chapter (Chapter XXI) on the devil, where Spinoza examined whether the devil may exist or not. He defines the devil as an entity which is contrary to God. However, if the devil is the opposite of God, the devil would consist of Nothingness, which does not exist.

In a paper called On Devils, he writes that we can a priori find out that such a thing cannot exist. Because the duration of a thing results in its degree of perfection, and the more essence a thing possess the more lasting it is, and since the devil has no perfection at all, it is impossible for the devil to be an existing thing. Evil or immoral behaviour in humans, such as anger, hate, envy, and all things for which the devil is blamed for could be explained without the proposal of a devil. Thus, the devil does not have any explanatory power and should be dismissed (Occam's razor).

Regarding evil through free choice, Spinoza asks how it can be that Adam would have chosen sin over his own well-being. Theology traditionally responds to this by asserting it is the devil who tempts humans into sin, but who would have tempted the devil? According to Spinoza, a rational being, such as the devil must have been, could not choose his own damnation. The devil must have known his sin would lead to doom, thus the devil was not knowing, or the devil did not know his sin will lead to doom, thus the devil would not have been a rational being. Spinoza concluded a strict determinism in which moral agency as a free choice, cannot exist.

=== Kant ===
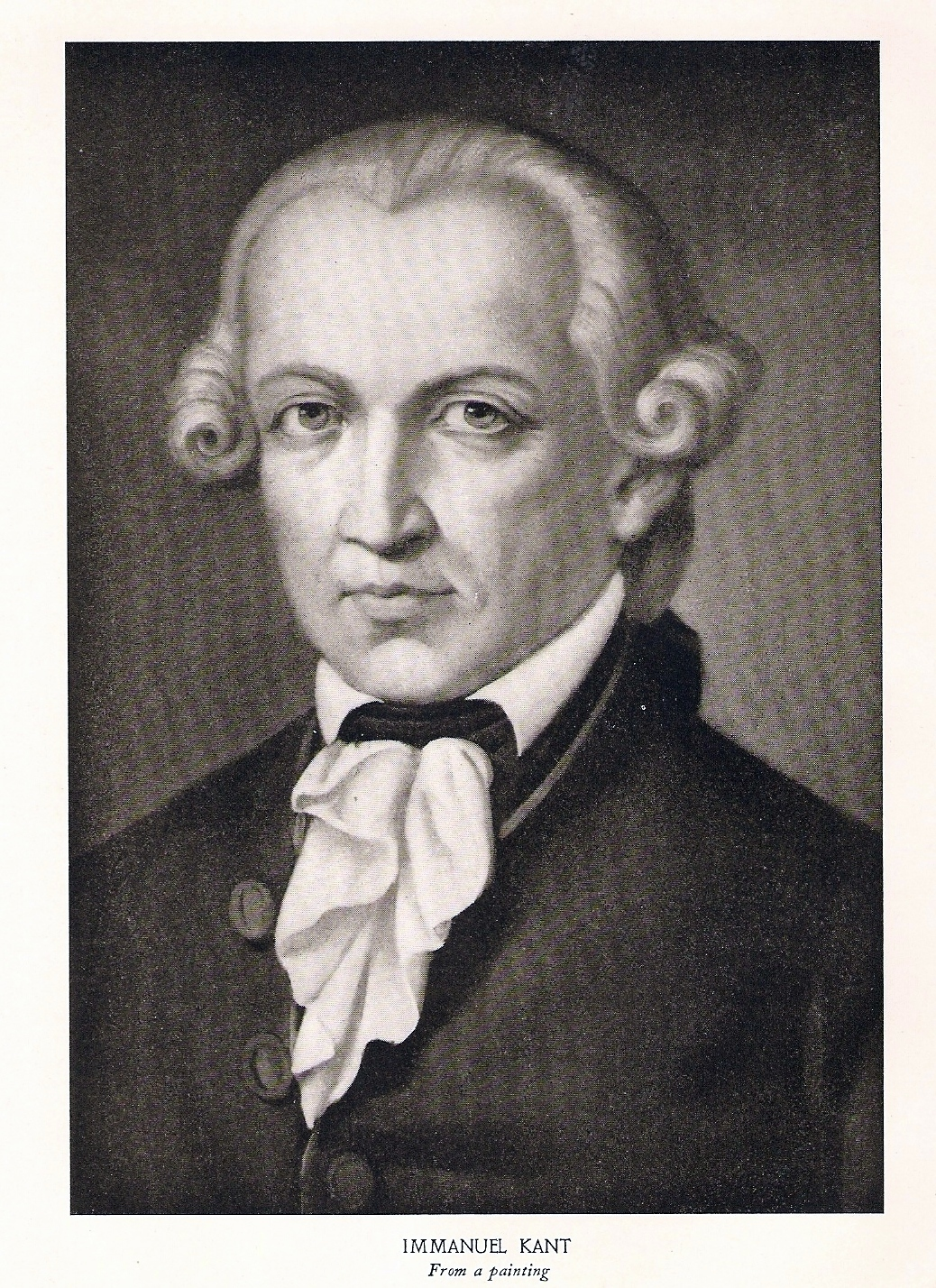
Engraving of Immanuel Kant

The Devil found a way into rational discourse through Immanuel Kant's personification of the "idea of absolute egoism". In Religion Within the Limits of Reason Alone, Immanuel Kant uses the devil as the personification of maximum moral reprehensibility. Deviating from the common Christian idea, Kant does not locate the morally reprehensible in sensual urges. Since evil has to be intelligible, only when the sensual is consciously placed above the moral obligation can something be regarded as morally evil. Thus, to be evil, the devil must be able to comprehend morality but consciously reject it, and, as a spiritual being (Geistwesen), having no relation to any form of sensual pleasure. It is necessarily required for the devil to be a spiritual being because if the devil were also a sensual being, it would be possible that the devil does evil to satisfy lower sensual desires, and does not act from the mind alone. The devil acts against morals, not to satisfy sensual lust, but solely for the sake of evil. As such, the devil is unselfish, for he does not benefit from his evil deeds.

However, Kant denies that a human being could ever be completely devilish, since a human does not act evil for the sake of evil itself, but for is perceived as good, such as a law or self-love. Kant argues that despite that there are devilish vices (ingratitude, envy, and malicious joy), i.e., vices that do not bring any personal advantage, however, the person cannot act for the sake of evil itself and thus, not be considered a devil. In his Lecture on Moral Philosophy (1774/75) Kant gives an example of a tulip seller who was in possession of a rare tulip, but when he learned that another seller had the same tulip, he bought it from him and then destroyed it instead of keeping it for himself. If he had acted according to his sensual urges, the seller would have kept the tulip for himself to make a profit, but not have destroyed it. Nevertheless, the destruction of the tulip cannot be completely absolved from sensual impulses, since a sensual joy or relief still accompanies the destruction of the tulip and therefore cannot be thought of solely as a violation of morality.

Kant further argues that a (spiritual) devil would be a self-contradiction. If the devil would be defined by doing evil, the devil had no free choice in the first place. But if the devil had no free-choice, the devil could not have been held accountable for his actions, since he had no free will but was only following his nature.

== Contemporary belief ==
Opinion polls show that belief in the devil in Western countries is more common in the United States, where it is more common among the religious, regular church goers, political conservatives, and the older folks,

Belief in the devil in 1982
Country	U.S.	U.K.	France
Percentage	~60	21	17

but has declined in recent decades.

Belief in the devil in the U.S. (Note: all polling done in May of that year)
Year surveyed	2001	2004	2007	2016	2023
Percentage believing	68	70	70	61	58

== See also ==
- Deal with the Devil
- Devil in popular culture
- Dualism in cosmology
- Hell
- Non-physical entity
- Underworld

== Sources ==
- Boureau, Alain (2006). Satan the Heretic: The Birth of Demonology in the Medieval West. University of Chicago Press. ISBN 978-0-226-06748-3.
- Brüggemann, Romy (2010). Die Angst vor dem Bösen: Codierungen des malum in der spätmittelalterlichen und frühneuzeitlichen Narren-, Teufel- und Teufelsbündnerliteratur [The fear of evil: Coding of the malum in the late medieval and early modern literature of fools, devils and allies of the devil] (in German). Königshausen & Neumann. ISBN 978-3-8260-4245-4.
- Costen, Michael (1997). The Cathars and the Albigensian Crusade. Manchester University Press. ISBN 978-0-7190-4332-1.
- Farrar, Thomas J. (2014). "Satan in early Gentile Christian communities: An exegetical study in Mark and 2 Corinthians" (PDF). dianoigo.
- Geisenhanslüke, Achim; Mein, Georg; Overthun, Rasmus (2015) [2009]. Geisenhanslüke, Achim; Mein, Georg (eds.). Monströse Ordnungen: Zur Typologie und Ästhetik des Anormalen [Monstrous Orders: On the Typology and Aesthetics of the Abnormal]. Literalität und Liminalität (in German). Vol. 12. Bielefeld: Transcript Verlag. doi:10.1515/9783839412572. ISBN 978-3-8394-1257-2.
- Goetz, Hans-Werner (2016). Gott und die Welt. Religiöse Vorstellungen des frühen und hohen Mittelalters. Teil I, Band 3: IV. Die Geschöpfe: Engel, Teufel, Menschen [God and the world. Religious Concepts of the Early and High Middle Ages. Part I, Volume 3: IV. The Creatures: Angels, Devils, Humans] (in German). Vandenhoeck & Ruprecht. ISBN 978-3-8470-0581-0.
- Grant, Robert M. (2006). Irenaeus of Lyons. Routledge. ISBN 978-1-134-81518-0.
- Kelly, Henry Ansgar (2004). The Devil, demonology, and witchcraft: the development of Christian beliefs in evil spirits. Wipf and Stock Publishers. ISBN 978-1-59244-531-8. OCLC 56727898.
- Kolb, Robert; Dingel, Irene; Batka, Lubomir, eds. (2014). The Oxford Handbook of Martin Luther's Theology. Oxford University Press. ISBN 978-0-19-960470-8.
- Koskenniemi, Erkki; Fröhlich, Ida (2013). Evil and the Devil. A&C Black. ISBN 978-0-567-60738-6.
- Lambert, Malcolm (1998). The Cathars. Wiley-Blackwell. ISBN 978-0-631-20959-1.
- Oberman, Heiko Augustinus (2006). Luther: Man Between God and the Devil. Yale University Press. ISBN 978-0-300-10313-7.
- Orlov, Andrei A. (2011). Dark Mirrors: Azazel and Satanael in Early Jewish Demonology. SUNY Press. ISBN 978-1-4384-3953-2.
- Russell, Jeffrey Burton (1986). Lucifer: The Devil in the Middle Ages. Cornell University Press. ISBN 978-0-8014-9429-1.
- Russell, Jeffrey Burton (1987a). Satan: The Early Christian Tradition. Cornell University Press. ISBN 978-0-8014-9413-0.
- Russell, Jeffrey Burton (1987b). The Devil: Perceptions of Evil from Antiquity to Primitive Christianity. Ithaca, N.Y: Cornell University Press. ISBN 978-0-8014-9409-3.
- Theißen, Gerd (2009). Erleben und Verhalten der ersten Christen: Eine Psychologie des Urchristentums [Experience and Behavior of the First Christians: A Psychology of Early Christianity] (in German). Gütersloher Verlagshaus. ISBN 978-3-641-02817-6.
- Tyneh, Carl S. (2003). Orthodox Christianity: Overview and Bibliography. Nova Publishers. ISBN 978-1-59033-466-9.
- Tzamalikos, Panayiotis (2007). Origen: Philosophy of History & Eschatology. BRILL. ISBN 978-90-474-2869-5.
