= Anathan =

Demon in Mandaeism

- Abode: World of Darkness
- Consort: Qin

In Mandaeism, Anathan or Anatan (Classical Mandaic: ࡀࡍࡀࡕࡀࡍ) is a demon in the World of Darkness (alma ḏ-hšuka) or underworld. He is the husband of Qin, a demoness who is the mother of Ruha and Zahreil. Hibil Ziwa encounters Anathan during his descent to the World of Darkness in Chapter 1 of Book 5 in the Right Ginza. In the aforementioned chapter, Anathan is described as "the warrior of darkness" (qarabtana ḏ-hšuka) and also as a "warlike giant." Together with Qin, the couple is described as the "giants of darkness" (gabaria ḏ-hšuka).
