= Krun =

Mandaean lord of the underworld

- Other names: Mountain of Flesh
- Abode: World of Darkness
- Symbol: Lion (in the skandola)

Krun (Modern Mandaic: [ˈkrun]; Classical Mandaic: ࡊࡓࡅࡍ) or Akrun ([æˈkrun]) is a Mandaean lord of the underworld. According to Mandaean cosmology, he dwells in the lowest depths of creation, supporting the entirety of the physical world.

== In mythology ==
Krun is the greatest of the five Mandaean lords of the underworld, the others being Shdum, Hag, Gaf, and Zartai-Zartanai, according to the 5th book of the right half of the Great Treasure (Ginza Rabba) of the Mandaeans, their most sacred text.

He is represented by the image of a lion on the skandola talisman, which is used to seal the graves of the newly dead. The epithet most frequently associated with him is ṭura rba ḏ-bisra (Classical Mandaic: ࡈࡅࡓࡀ ࡓࡁࡀ ࡖࡁࡉࡎࡓࡀ, lit. 'the great mountain of flesh').

== In astronomy ==
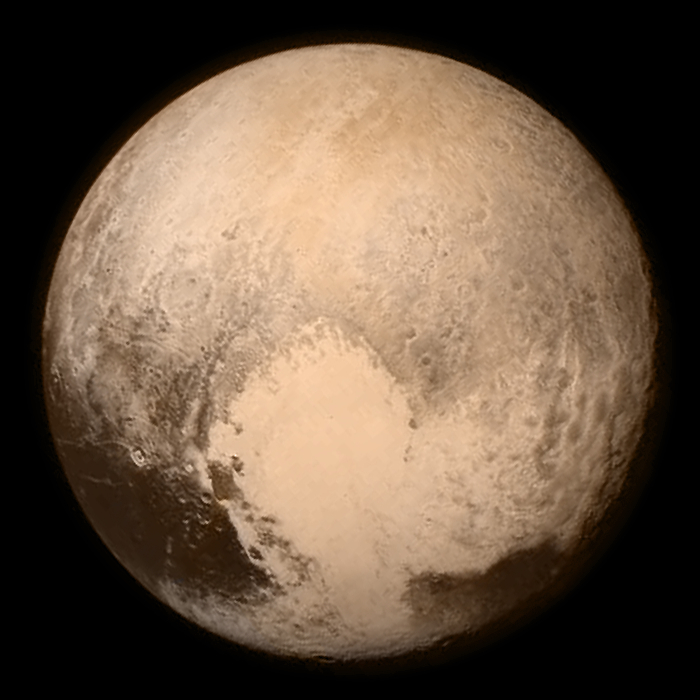
Near-true-color image of Pluto taken 13 July 2015, with Krun Macula (now Safronov Regio) on the limb at 5 o'clock

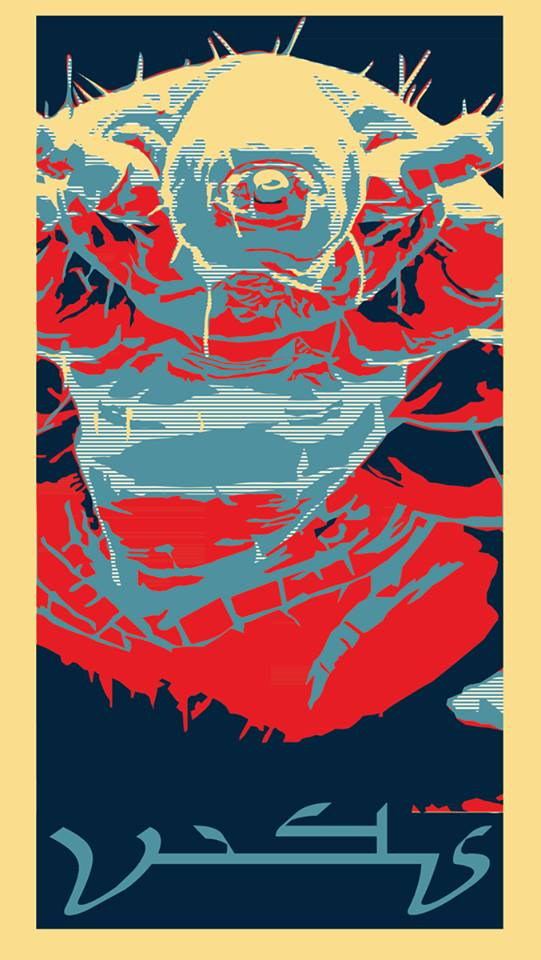
Image of the Mandaean underworld figure Krun created by Charles G. Häberl

The Mandaean community of Iraq and Iran is one of the few communities from the Middle East that still preserve the ancient Babylonian tradition of divination by the stars and heavenly bodies (astrology), directly from its source, even retaining the traditional Akkadian names for the stars and the visible planets. Despite this unique distinction, the Mandaeans had previously been unrepresented in astronomical place-names.

Starting March 20, 2015, the Search for Extraterrestrial Life solicited names, and votes on names, from the interested public for the features of Pluto and its satellites, which had yet to be documented. Rutgers professor Charles G. Häberl initiated a social media campaign, "Vote Krun," to recognize the Mandaeans by bestowing a Mandaic name upon one such feature. The Vote Krun campaign noted that since the time of Percival Lowell and Clyde Tombaugh, heavenly cosmography had expanded beyond names from Greco-Roman antiquity to the celebrated figures of many cultures and traditions, but not yet the Mandaeans.

A dark region along the equator of the dwarf planet Pluto, immediately to the right of the large bright feature Tombaugh Regio, was informally named "Krun Macula" by NASA scientists. However, Krun Macula was later superseded by the name Safronov Regio in 2023.

== See also ==
- Ginza Rabba
- Ruha, the queen of the underworld in Mandaeism

== Notes ==
=== Sources ===
- Drower, E.S. (1937). The Mandaeans of Iraq and Iran. Oxford, UK: Oxford University Press.
