= Giu (Mandaeism) =

Demon in Mandaeism

- Abode: World of Darkness

In Mandaeism, Giu (Classical Mandaic: ࡂࡉࡅ) is a demon in the World of Darkness (alma ḏ-hšuka) or underworld. Hibil Ziwa encounters Giu during his descent to the World of Darkness in Chapter 1 of Book 5 in the Right Ginza.
