= Qin (Mandaeism) =

Demon in Mandaeism

- Other names: Sumqaq
- Abode: World of Darkness
- Consort: Anathan
- Offspring: Ruha, Zahreil

In Mandaeism, Qin (Classical Mandaic: ࡒࡉࡍ, Modern Mandaic pronunciation: [qin]) is the mother of Ruha and Zahreil, and grandmother of Ur in the World of Darkness (alma ḏ-hšuka) or underworld. In Mandaean texts, she is frequently mentioned as the "queen of darkness." One of her epithets is Sumqaq (ࡎࡅࡌࡒࡀࡒ), which also refers to a well of polluted water in the World of Darkness. Her husband is the demon Anathan.

In Book 5 of the Right Ginza, Qin gives her daughter Zahreil for Hibil to marry.
