= Zartai-Zartanai =

Demon in Mandaeism

- Abode: World of Darkness
- Consort: Amamit

In Mandaeism, Zartai-Zartanai (Classical Mandaic: ࡆࡀࡓࡕࡀࡉ ࡅࡆࡀࡓࡕࡀࡍࡀࡉ) is a demon in the World of Darkness (alma ḏ-hšuka) or underworld. Hibil Ziwa encounters Zartai-Zartanai during his descent to the World of Darkness in Chapter 1 of Book 5 in the Right Ginza, which mentions Zartai-Zartanai's wife as Amamit (an epithet of Libat, or Venus).
