= Asrestar =

Class of demons in Manichaeism

Asrestar is a class of demons in Manichaeism. They appear prominently in the Manichaean creation myth, especially the creation of mankind. Accordingly, Az decided to create humans in the image of the Third Messenger and mingled the demonic asrestar with the light particles, that is basically the soul. Although most asrestar are indistinguishable, an eminent demon called Šaklūn, features as demiurgic demon entrapping humans in the material world during the Adam and Eve narration. Human's urges for evil, such as lying, are remaining parts of the asrestar within the body.

== Manichaean Demonology ==
The demonology of the Asrestar integrates itself within Manichaean cosmology, which reflects a dualistic metaphysical structure, wherein these entities serve as remnants of the primal darkness and are integrally tied to human composition and behavior. The Asrestar originate from the dark realm led by the Prince of Darkness and were incorporated into the material and psychic constitution of humanity during the creation act intended as a trap by the demonic forces. According to Manichaean scripture, Az, the demonic artificer, mixed particles of light—divine soul fragments—with the Asrestar, thus fashioning humans as beings of dual nature, prone to internal conflict.

The demon Šaklūn, identified as a demiurgic figure, played a central role in the entrapment of these light particles within corporeality, positioning him as analogous to a false creator god who forges material existence as a prison. While most Asrestar are indistinct and represent generalized evil traits, Šaklūn emerges as a specific antagonist during the Adam and Eve episode in the Manichaean retelling, symbolizing the perversion of divine light through desire and deception. Thus the Asrestar are not just demons external to humanity but are embedded in the very essence of the human condition within, giving rise to tendencies such as lying, lust, and anger.

The Asrestar, however, are not portrayed as independent moral agent, but as elemental forces or psychic residues of darkness left unpurified during creation. In post-creation cosmology, these beings continue to exert influence through the planetary rulers (archontic demons), who manage the cycles of rebirth and the imprisonment of light in the flesh. Their influence persists in dreams, impulses, and passions that obscure spiritual awakening and delay liberation of the light-soul from material constraints.

== See also ==
- Ur (Mandaeism)
