= Shdum =

Demon in Mandaeism

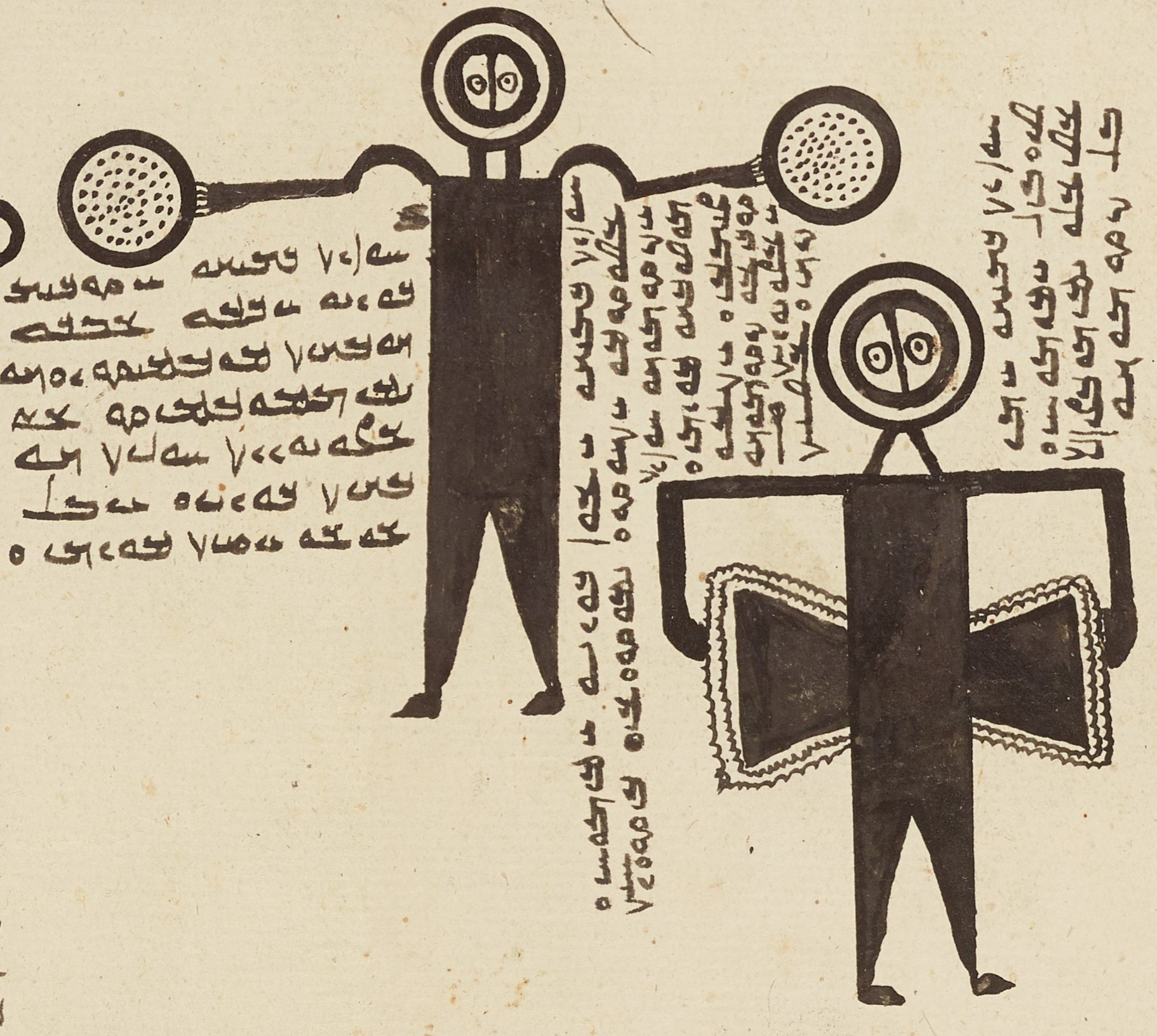
- The demons Shdum (upper left, with two cymbals) and Miṭiaiel (lower right, with a double-headed drum) in the Scroll of Abatur (DC 8)
- Other names: Ashdum
- Abode: World of Darkness

In Mandaeism, Shdum (Šdum) (Classical Mandaic: ࡔࡃࡅࡌ) or Ashdum (Ašdum) is a demon in the World of Darkness (alma ḏ-hšuka) or underworld. Hibil Ziwa encounters Shdum during his descent to the World of Darkness in Chapter 1 of Book 5 in the Right Ginza, where he is described as the "King of Darkness" and also as the "Grandson of Darkness" (br brḥ ḏ-hšuka).

He is also referred to as Šdum-Daiwa in The Thousand and Twelve Questions.

== See also ==
- Shedim
- Ur (Mandaeism)
