= Skandola =

Talismanic seal used by Mandaeans

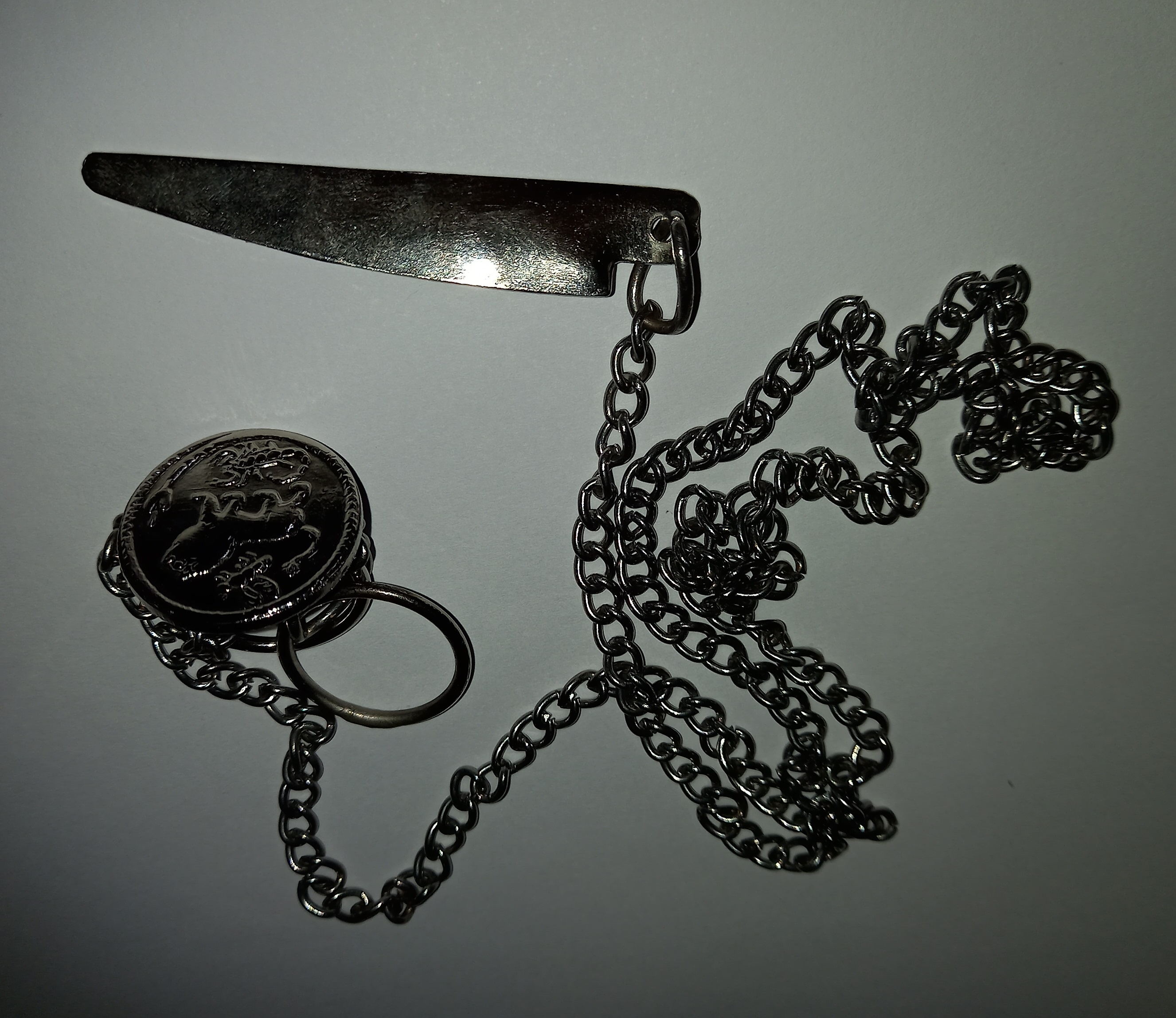
A skandola made of steel

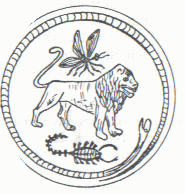
Drawing of the skandola

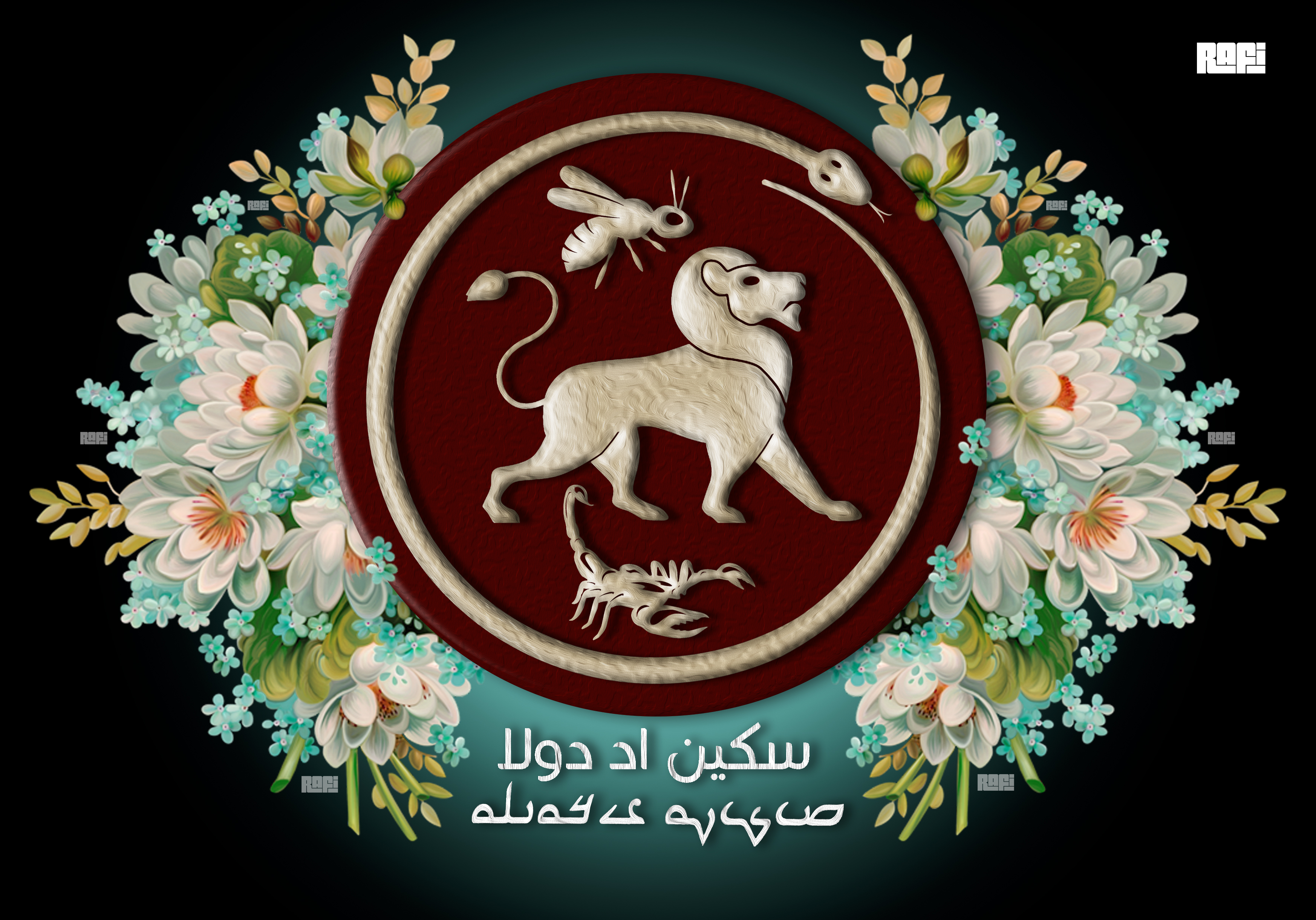
Stylized artistic depiction of the skandola

The skandola, also known as the sikina ḏ-aula (Classical Mandaic: ࡎࡉࡊࡉࡍࡀ ࡖࡀࡅࡋࡀ, romanized: sikina ḏ-aula; also sakin dola or sakin ḏ-ula, literally "knife of (against) evil" in Mandaic) is a ritual talismanic seal used by Mandaeans to protect against evil.

== Description ==
The skandola is an iron ring with a chain attached to an iron knife. It is used as a sacred talismanic seal. It is used to seal graves and also newborn babies on their navels. During wedding ceremonies, a priest gives the skandola to the bridegroom. There are incised depictions of the following animals:

- Lion, representing Krun
- Scorpion, representing Hag
- Black snake or serpent, representing Ur
- Wasp or hornet

E. S. Drower notes parallels with Mithraic bas-reliefs, Yazidism, Iranian artistic symbols, and others. A Mandaean priest told Drower that the skandola was originally brought by Hibil Ziwa from the World of Darkness as he was taking Ruha along with him (a narrative found in Book 5, Chapter 1 of the Right Ginza).

== See also ==
- Talisman
- Hamsa
