= Hag and Mag =

Pair of demons in Mandaeism

- Abode: World of Darkness
- Symbol: Scorpion, representing Hag (in the skandola)

Equivalents
- Jewish: Gog and Magog

In Mandaeism, Hag (Classical Mandaic: ࡄࡀࡂ) and Mag (Classical Mandaic: ࡌࡀࡂ) are a pair of demons that are usually mentioned together. Hag is a male demon, while Mag is a female demon. Hibil Ziwa encounters Hag and Mag during his descent to the World of Darkness in Chapter 1 of Book 5 in the Right Ginza, where they are described as "the two manas of darkness." Hag is represented by the image of a scorpion on the skandola talisman.

== Etymology ==
The names Hag and Mag are likely derived from Gog and Magog.

== See also ==
- Adathan and Yadathan, a pair of uthras in the World of Light
- Gog and Magog in Judaism
