= Zahreil =

Mythological figure in Mandaeism

- Abode: World of Darkness

Genealogy
- Parents: Qin
- Siblings: Ruha
- Offspring: Ptahil

In Mandaeism, Zahreil or Zahrʿil (Classical Mandaic: ࡆࡀࡄࡓࡏࡉࡋ, Modern Mandaic pronunciation: [zahriˈel]) is the daughter of Qin, sister of Ruha, and mother of Ptahil. According to Book 5 of the Right Ginza, during Hibil Ziwa's descent to the World of Darkness (alma d-hšuka) or underworld, Hibil Ziwa marries Zahreil, who then gives birth to the creator of the material universe, Ptahil.

Zahreil is a lilith (Classical Mandaic: ࡋࡉࡋࡉࡕࡀ, romanized: lilita) from the World of Darkness who dwells in the beds of pregnant women serving to ensure the wellbeing of the child before and after birth; E. S. Drower describes her as a genius of childbirth.

== See also ==
- Senoy, Sansenoy and Semangelof, three angels in Jewish folklore who protect women and newborns during and after childbirth
