= Gaf (Mandaeism) =

Demon in Mandaeism

- Other names: Gap
- Abode: World of Darkness
- Consort: Ruha
- Offspring: Ur

In Mandaeism, Gaf or Gap (Classical Mandaic: ࡂࡀࡐ) is the male consort of Ruha, the queen of the World of Darkness (alma ḏ-hšuka) or underworld. His son is Ur, king (malka) of the World of Darkness. He is mentioned in book 5 of the Ginza Rabba. Gaf is typically portrayed as a giant.

In Book 5, Chapter 1 of the Right Ginza (also known as the "Book of the Underworld"), Gaf and Gafan (Gap and Gapan) are mentioned as a pair of demons. Gafan is a female demon paired with Gaf.
