= Ur (Mandaeism) =

Character within Mandaeism

- Other names: Leviathan, Bar-Spag
- Abode: World of Darkness
- Symbol: Serpent or snake (in the skandola)
- Parents: Ruha and Gaf

Equivalents
- Judaism: Leviathan

In Mandaeism, ʿUr (Classical Mandaic: ࡏࡅࡓ) is the king (Classical Mandaic: ࡌࡀࡋࡊࡀ, romanized: malka) of the World of Darkness (alma ḏ-hšuka) or underworld. He is the son of Ruha, the queen of the underworld, and her brother Gaf (also spelled Gap), one of the giants in the World of Darkness described in book 5 of the Ginza Rabba. Ur is typically portrayed as a large, ferocious dragon or snake. He is represented by the image of a serpent on the skandola talisman.

The Mandaean Book of John contrasts Ur, the King of Darkness, with the King of Light (Hayyi Rabbi).

== Names ==
Ur has also been referred in Mandaean texts as Leviathan (Classical Mandaic: ࡋࡉࡅࡉࡀࡕࡀࡍ, romanized: liuiatan; from Right Ginza 15.1). According to the Right Ginza 5.1, his mother Ruha called him "the Great Giant, the Power of Darkness" (gabara rba, haila ḏ-hšuka).

Ur's epithets include Bar-Spag (Classical Mandaic: ࡁࡓ ࡎࡐࡀࡂ, lit. 'Son of Spag') and other names.

== Parallels ==
Aldihisi (2008) compares Ur to Tiamat in Babylonian mythology and Samael in Gnostic literature.

== See also ==
- Shdum, also known as the "King of Darkness"
- Leviathan
- Nagaraja
- Tiamat
- Yaldabaoth
- Ahriman
- Asrestar
- Prince of Darkness (Manichaeism)
