= World of Darkness (Mandaeism) =

Underworld in Mandaeism

In Mandaeism, the World of Darkness (Classical Mandaic: ࡀࡋࡌࡀ ࡖࡄࡔࡅࡊࡀ, romanized: alma ḏ-hšuka) is the underworld located below Tibil (Earth). It is ruled by its king Ur the Leviathan and its queen Ruha, mother of the seven planets and twelve constellations.

== Description ==
The great dark Sea of Suf lies in the World of Darkness. The great dividing river of Hitfun, analogous to the Styx in Greek mythology, separates the World of Darkness from the World of Light. Siniawis is one of the regions of the World of Darkness.

The Ginza Rabba mention the Abaddons (ebdunia) as part of the World of Darkness. The Right Ginza mentions the existence of the "upper Abaddons" (ebdunia ʿlaiia) as well as the "lower Abaddons" (ebdunia titaiia).

The World of Darkness is sometimes referred to as Sheol (šiul) in the Ginza Rabba and other Mandaean scriptures.

== Inhabitants ==
Various beings inhabit the World of Darkness.

== See also ==
- Sheol
- Ancient Mesopotamian underworld
