= Etinsib Ziwa =

Divine being in Mandaeism

Etinṣib Ziwa
- Other names: Etinṣib
- Abode: World of Light
- Battles: Initiator of the battle against Nbaṭ

In Mandaeism, Etinṣib Ziwa or Ītinṣib Ziwa (Classical Mandaic: ࡏࡕࡉࡍࡑࡉࡁ ࡆࡉࡅࡀ, romanized: ʿtinṣib Ziwa, lit. 'Splendid Transplant') is an uthra (angel or divine being) who starts a battle against Nbaṭ. Etinṣib Ziwa only appears in a few chapters of the Mandaean Book of John.

== Battle against Nbaṭ ==
In Chapter 3 of the Mandaean Book of John, when Etinṣib Ziwa starts a battle against Nbaṭ, he unsuccessfully attempted to strike Nbaṭ with a sword three times. Nbaṭ then calls the 21 sons of Yushamin, led by Gubran, to fight against Etinṣib Ziwa. Etinṣib Ziwa proceeds to shoot arrows at Gubran. On the first three attempts, Gubran was able to catch the arrows with his right hand, but on the fourth shot, an arrow struck the forelimb of Paraheil, Gubran's vehicle who is a heavenly steed or warhorse. This provokes an all-out war in which Yawar, Bihram, and Yukabar slaughter all the sons of Yushamin.

According to Chapter 3 of the Mandaean Book of John, Bihrath-Anana is the mother of Etinṣib Ziwa.

== See also ==
- Yushamin
- Nbat
- Nsab
- List of angels in theology
