= Hitfun =

River in Mandaean cosmology

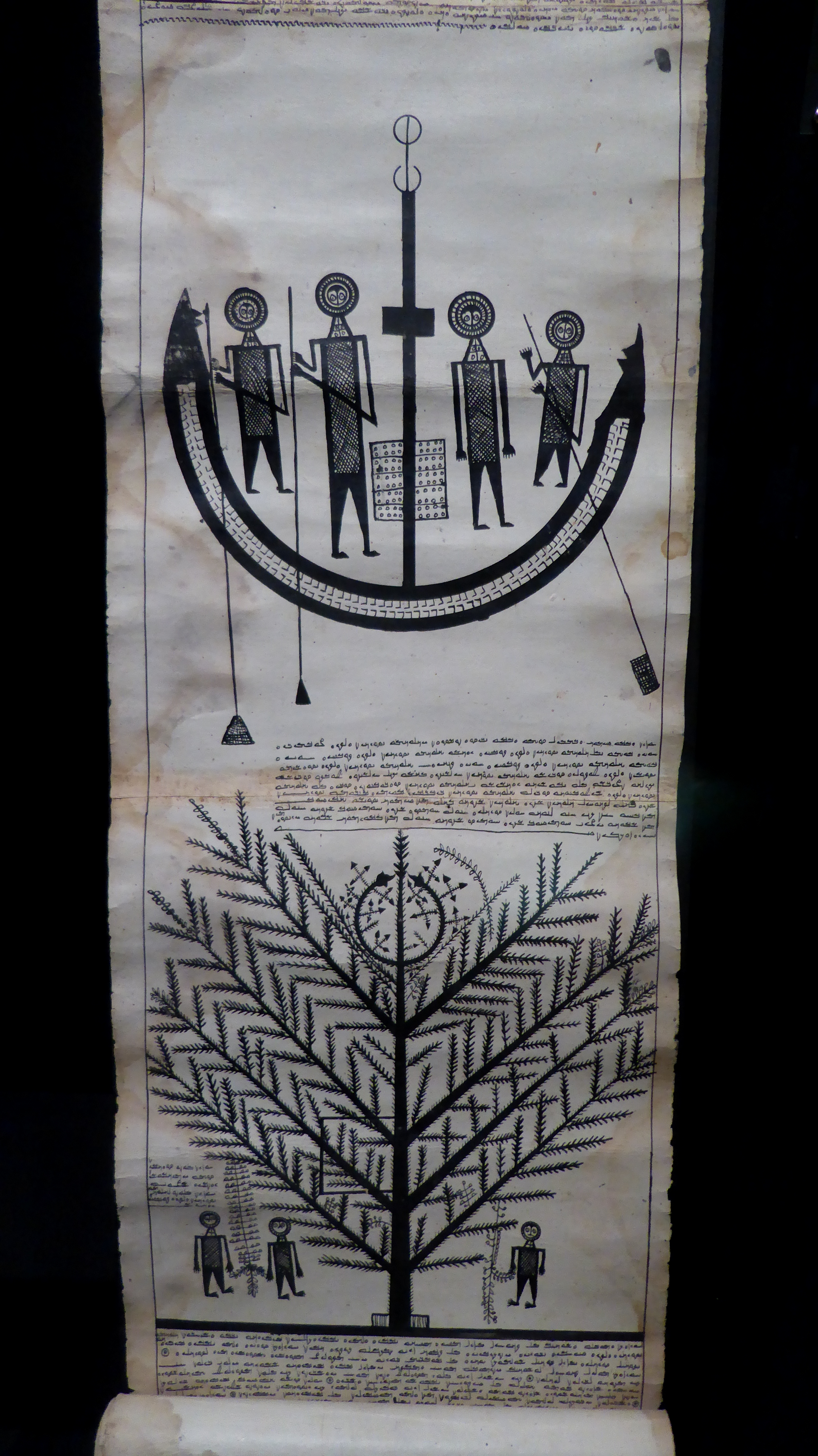
An 18th-century manuscript of the Scroll of Abatur in the Bodleian Library, Oxford. The illustration on top depicts the ship Shahrat ferrying Mandaean souls across the Hitfun towards the house of Abatur, while the lower illustration shows the tree of Shatrin with the souls of unbaptized children.

In Mandaean cosmology, Hiṭfun (written Mandaic: Hiṭpun) or Hiṭfon (Hiṭpon) (Classical Mandaic: ࡄࡉࡈࡐࡅࡍ) is a great dividing river separating the World of Darkness from the World of Light. It is mentioned in Hymn 25 of the third book of the Left Ginza. The river of Hiṭfun is analogous to the river Styx in Greek mythology and Hubur in Mesopotamian mythology.

It is also known as hapiqia mia or hafiqia mia (Classical Mandaic: ࡄࡐࡉࡒࡉࡀ ࡌࡉࡀ), which means "streams/springs of water" or "outflowing water." The water is fresh, and is located in a realm that is situated between Abatur's and Yushamin's realms.

== In Mandaean scriptures ==
The Scroll of Abatur has many illustrations of boats ferrying souls across this river.

According to the 1012 Questions, masiqta rituals are needed to guide departed souls across the river and into the World of Light.

In chapters 36, 51, and 55 of the Mandaean Book of John, the river Kšaš is the river that the souls of the dead must cross in order to reach the World of Light.

== See also ==
- Shahrat
- Piriawis
- Hubur in Mesopotamian mythology
- Styx in Greek mythology
- Gjöll in Norse mythology
- Vaitarna River (mythological) in Hinduism
- Yomotsu Hirasaka in Shinto cosmology
- Sanzu River in Japanese Buddhist mythology
- Kalunga line in Kongo mythology
- Liminality
