= Bihram =

Uthra of baptism in Mandaeism

- Uthra of Baptism
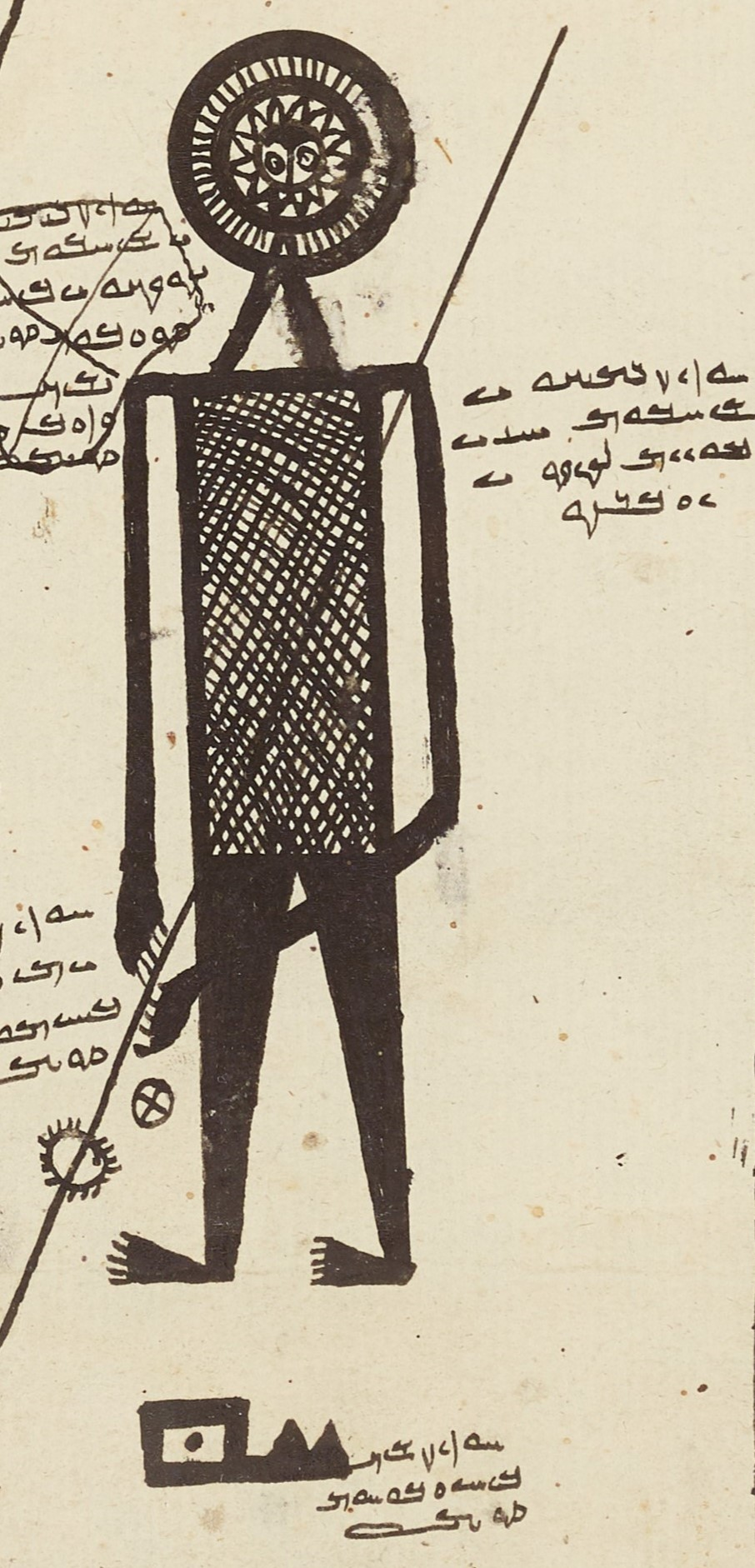
- Bihram in the Scroll of Abatur (DC 8)
- Other names: Bihram Rabba
- Abode: World of Light

Equivalents
- Sethian Gnostic: Micheus, Michar, and Mnesinous

In Mandaeism, Bihram (Classical Mandaic: ࡁࡉࡄࡓࡀࡌ, Modern Mandaic pronunciation: [bɑhˈrɑm]) or Bihram Rabba (Classical Mandaic: ࡁࡉࡄࡓࡀࡌ ࡓࡁࡀ, "Bihram the Great") is an uthra (angel or guardian) who presides over the masbuta, or baptism ritual. Bihram is mentioned in Mandaean texts such as the Qulasta. Many Mandaean masbuta ritual prayers invoke the name of Bihram.

== Etymology ==
The name Bihram may have originally been derived from the Persian name Bahram, in reference to one or several of the Sasanian kings of the third century A.D.

== Uthra of baptism ==
Mandaeans consider Bihram to be the uthra of baptism. Similarly, in Sethianism, Micheus, Michar, and Mnesinous are three heavenly guardian spirits presiding over the baptism of the Living Water (see also Five Seals).

== Mandaean name ==
Bihram is also a Mandaean male baptismal name (as opposed to Mandaean birth names). Notable Mandaeans with the name include Yahya Bihram. In the colophons of Mandaean texts, the name Bihram is also often mentioned for different priests and copyists of various eras.

== In Mandaean scriptures ==
In chapter 3 of the Mandaean Book of John, Bihram, led by Nbaṭ and the uthras Gubran, Yawar, and Yukabar, helps lead a rebellion against Yushamin and his 21 sons. Yawar kills 12 of Yushamin's sons, while Bihram kills 9 of them.

== See also ==
- List of angels in theology
- Bahram (name)
  - Bahrām I, r. 273-276
  - Bahrām II, r. 276-293
  - Bahrām III, r. 293
- Vahrām
- Micheus, Michar, and Mnesinous in Sethianism
