= Scroll of Abatur =

Mandaean text

Diwan Abatur
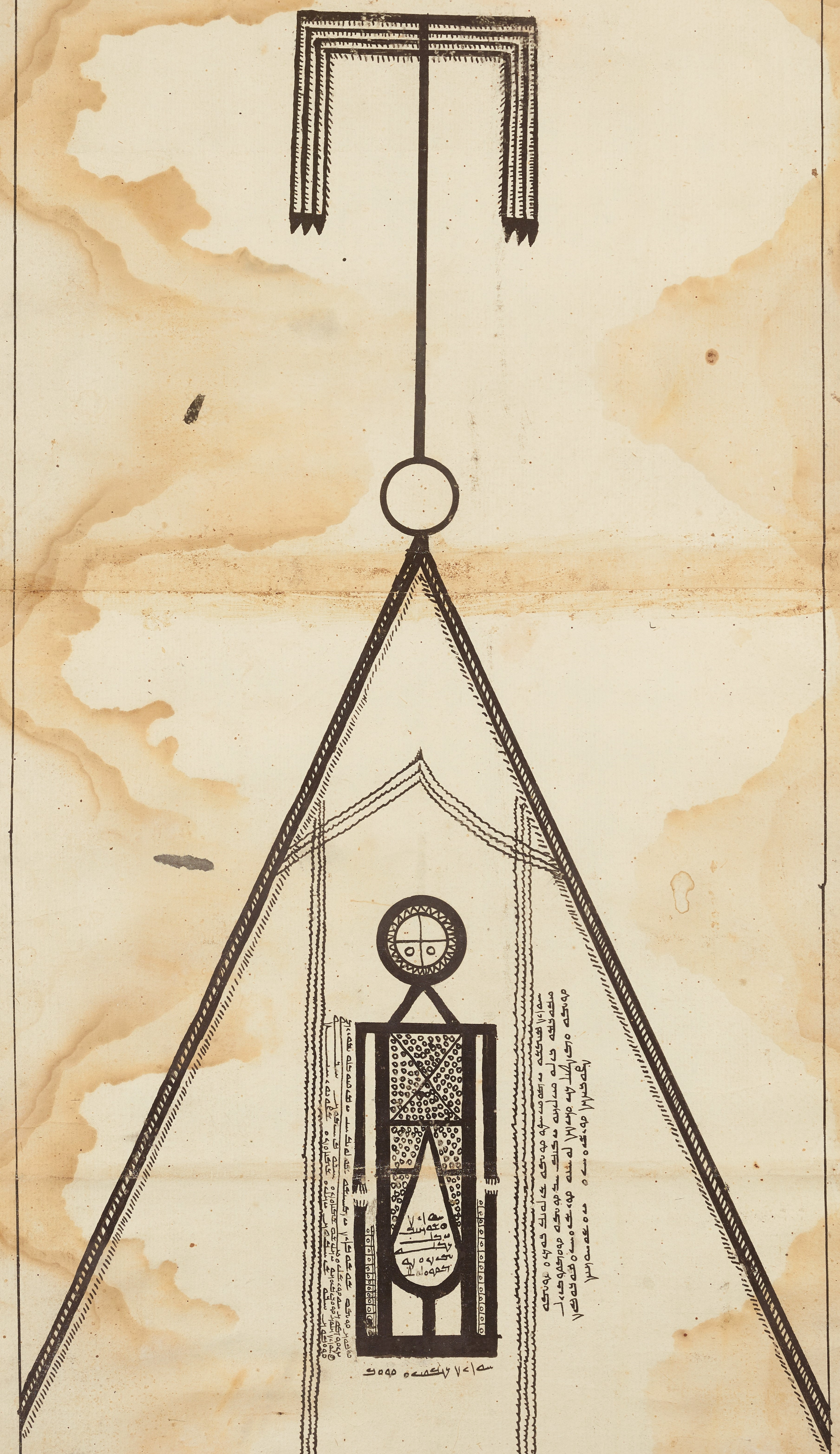
- Abatur Muzania("Abatur of the Scales") in Diwan Abatur depicted as being under a canopy

Information
- Religion: Mandaeism
- Language: Mandaic language

The Diwan Abatur (ࡃࡉࡅࡀࡍ ࡀࡁࡀࡕࡅࡓ; "Scroll of Abatur"; Modern Mandaic: Diwān Abāthor) is a Mandaean religious text. It is a large illustrated scroll that is over 20 ft. (6.1 m) long.

A similar illustrated Mandaean scroll is the Diwan Nahrawata ("The Scroll of the Rivers"), a lavishly illustrated geographical treatise which was translated into German and published by Kurt Rudolph in 1982.

== Manuscripts and translations ==
An English translation of the text was published by E. S. Drower in 1950 A.D., which was based on manuscript 8 of the Drower Collection (abbreviated DC 8).

A manuscript of the Diwan Abatur, MS Borgiani Siriaci 175 (abbreviated BS 175), is held at the Biblioteca Apostolica Vaticana in Vatican City. A facsimile copy of the manuscript, photographed by B. Pörtner, was published by Julius Euting in 1904.

From 2018 to 2024, Bogdan Burtea worked on a translation project for the Diwan Abatur.

== Contents ==
The Diwan Abatur mentions a heavenly tree called Shatrin (Šatrin) where the souls of unbaptized Mandaean children are temporarily nourished for 30 days. On the 30th day, Hibil Ziwa baptizes the souls of the children, who then continue on to the World of Light. The tree has a length of 360,000 parasangs according to the Diwan Abatur. Another tree mentioned in the Diwan Abatur is Gabriel Rihmat ('she-loved-Gabriel', a date palm).

Additionally, the Diwan Abatur mentions a ship called Shahrat (Šahrat; lit. "she kept watch") that ferries the righteous souls from Tibil across the Hitpun and into the house of Abatur. Non-righteous souls cannot use the ship and must walk.

The Scroll of Abatur lists several matartas belonging to the sons of Ptahil, namely Raglʿil, Sharhabiel, El-Sfar, Nbaṭ, Bhaq, and Shitil. There are also illustrations and descriptions of matartas belonging to each of the seven planets, with each matarta having an area of 2,000 parasangs and being 2,000-3,000 parasangs away from the next matarta. The matartas are frequently guarded by zanghaiia, or chained animals such as dogs, wolves, or lions.

- Kiwan: contains two lions
- Nirig: contains two dogs/wolves
- Nbu:protected by wolves
- Bil
- Libat
- Sin
- Shamish

In the Diwan Abatur, the sons of Ptahil who each rule different matartas are:

- Bihram Rba
- Anush
- Hibil
- Kanziel (also spelled Ganziel or Ginziel)
- Raglʿil
- Sharhabiel
- El-Sfar
- Nbaṭ
- Bhaq
- Shitil

The scroll also contains illustrations of several female uthras and underworld figures such as:

- Dmut Hiia
- Hawa
- Libat
- Mdinat Hiia
- Miriai
- ʿQaimat
- Ruha
- Sharhabiel
- Simat Hiia

== Gallery ==
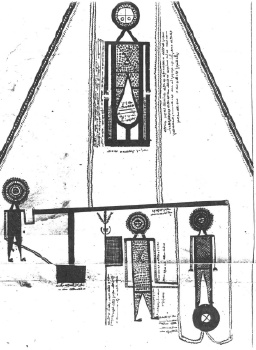
Depiction of Abatur at the scales.The figure at the top is Abatur.

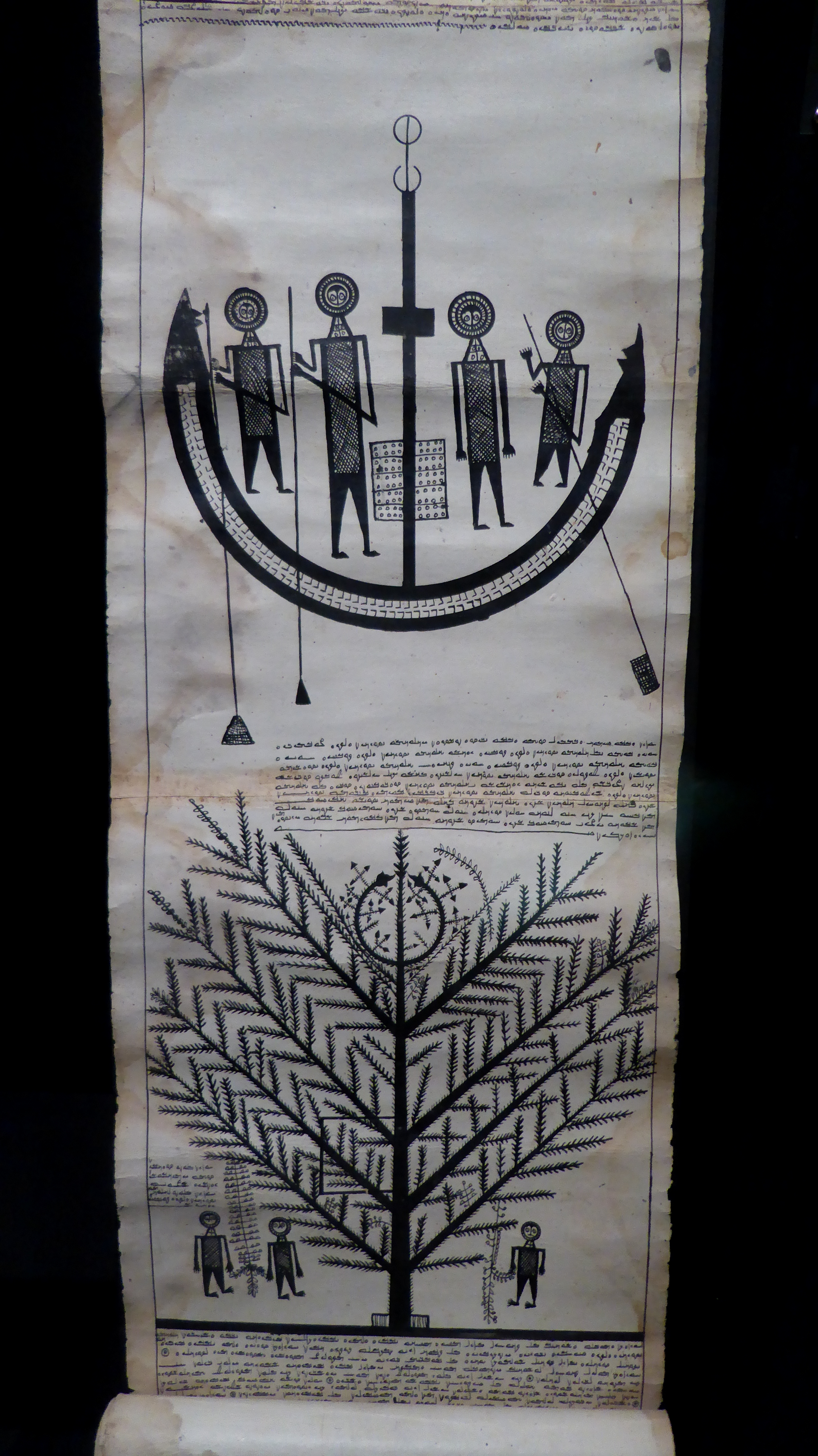
MS DC 8, an 18th-century manuscript of the Diwan Abatur in the Bodleian Library, Oxford. The illustration on top depicts the ship Shahrat ferrying Mandaean souls towards the house of Abatur, while the lower illustration shows the tree of Shatrin with the souls of unbaptized children.

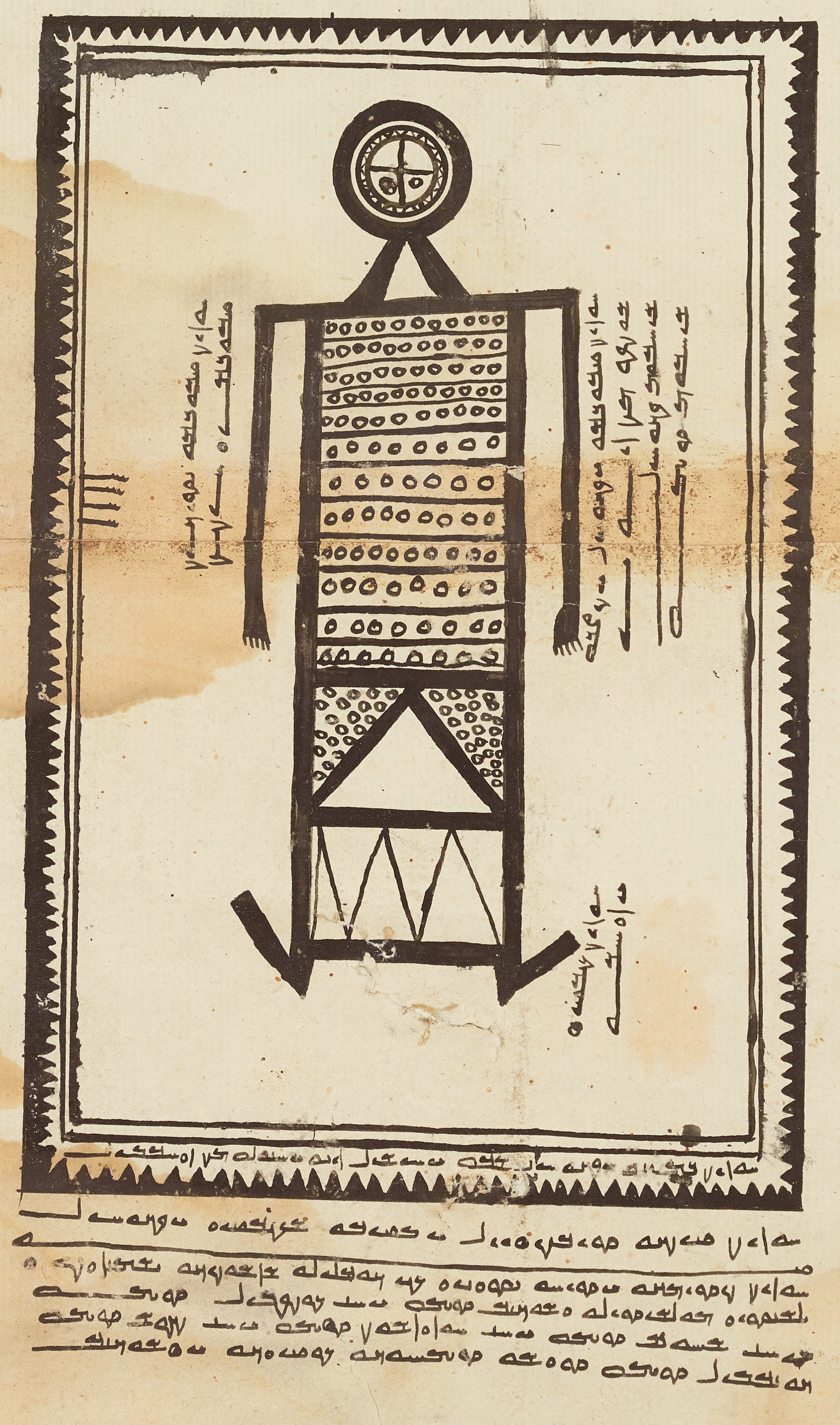
Ptahil, the first illustrated figure in the scroll

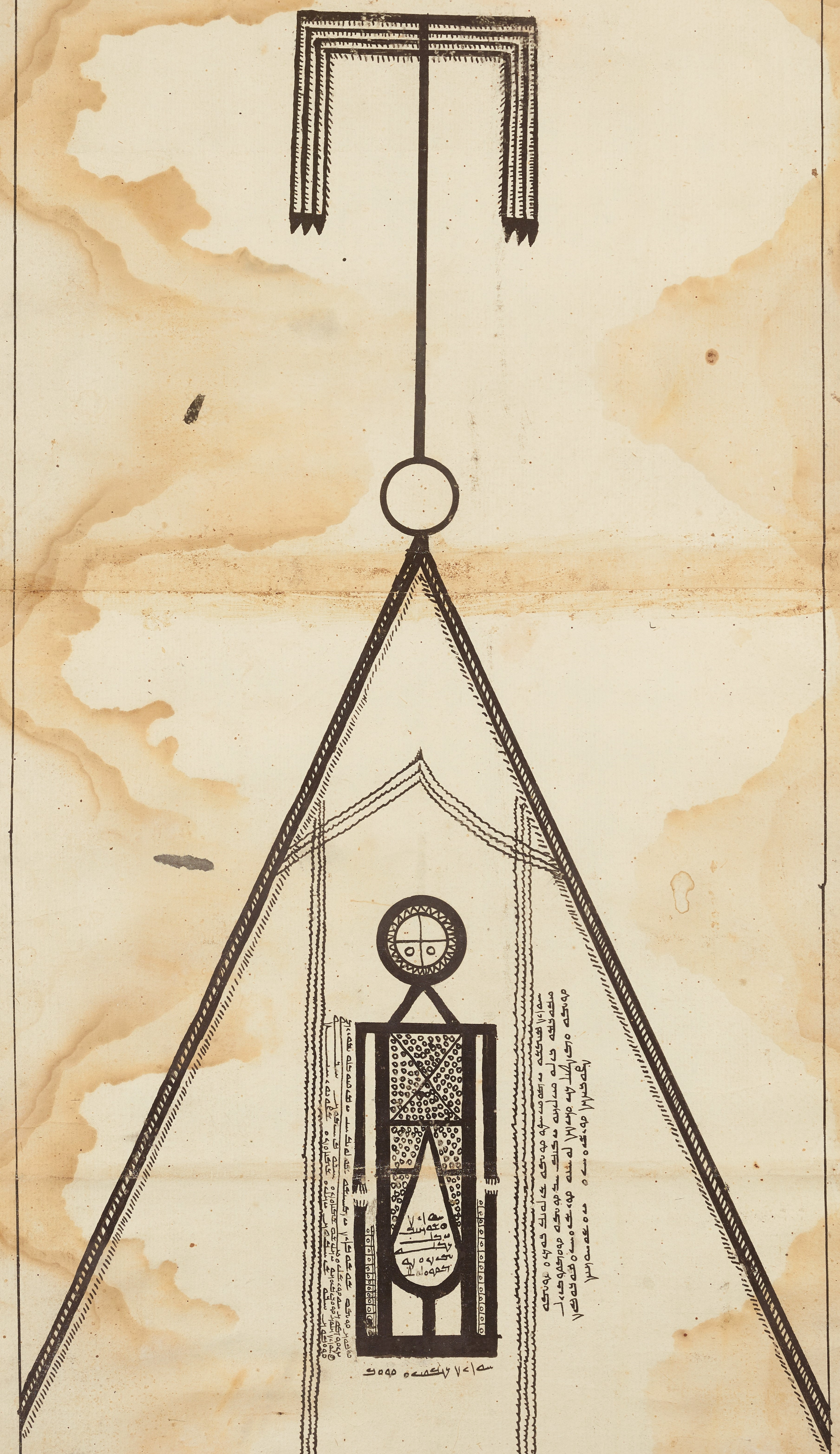
Abatur, here known as Abatur at the Scales (Abatur Muzania)

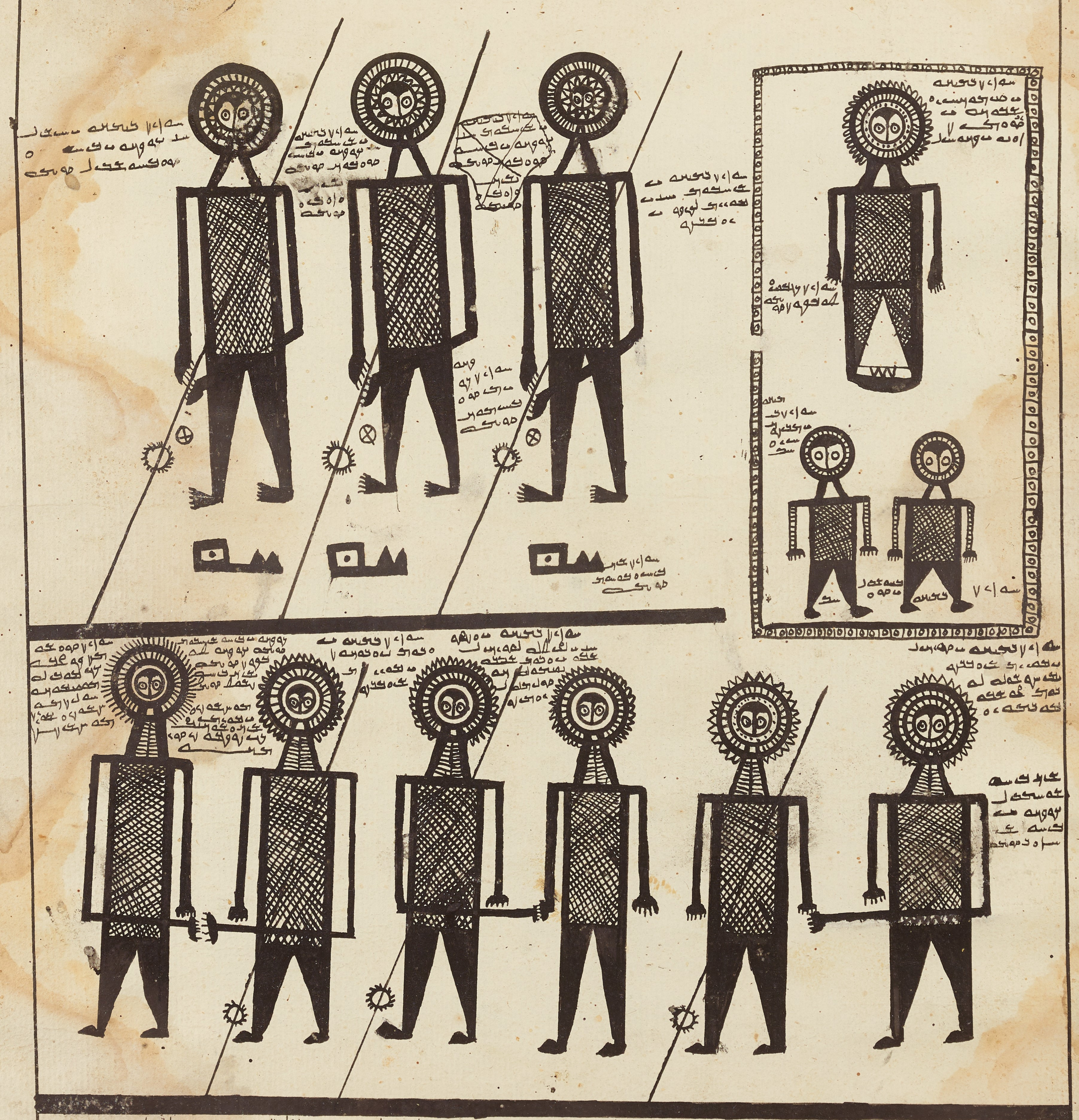
The figures on the top row at the left of the oblong dressed in priestly attire(holding rod like figure) are uthras, Bihram(the two left figures depicted) and Hibil(upper right).The figures inside the oblong are Simat Hayyi(Above),Mdinat Hiia(bottom left) and Sharhabeil(bottom right). The three figures at the bottom row with priestly attire are the uthras of Shitil ,Adam and Anush(from left to right), depicted respectively with their server boys(Shganda).

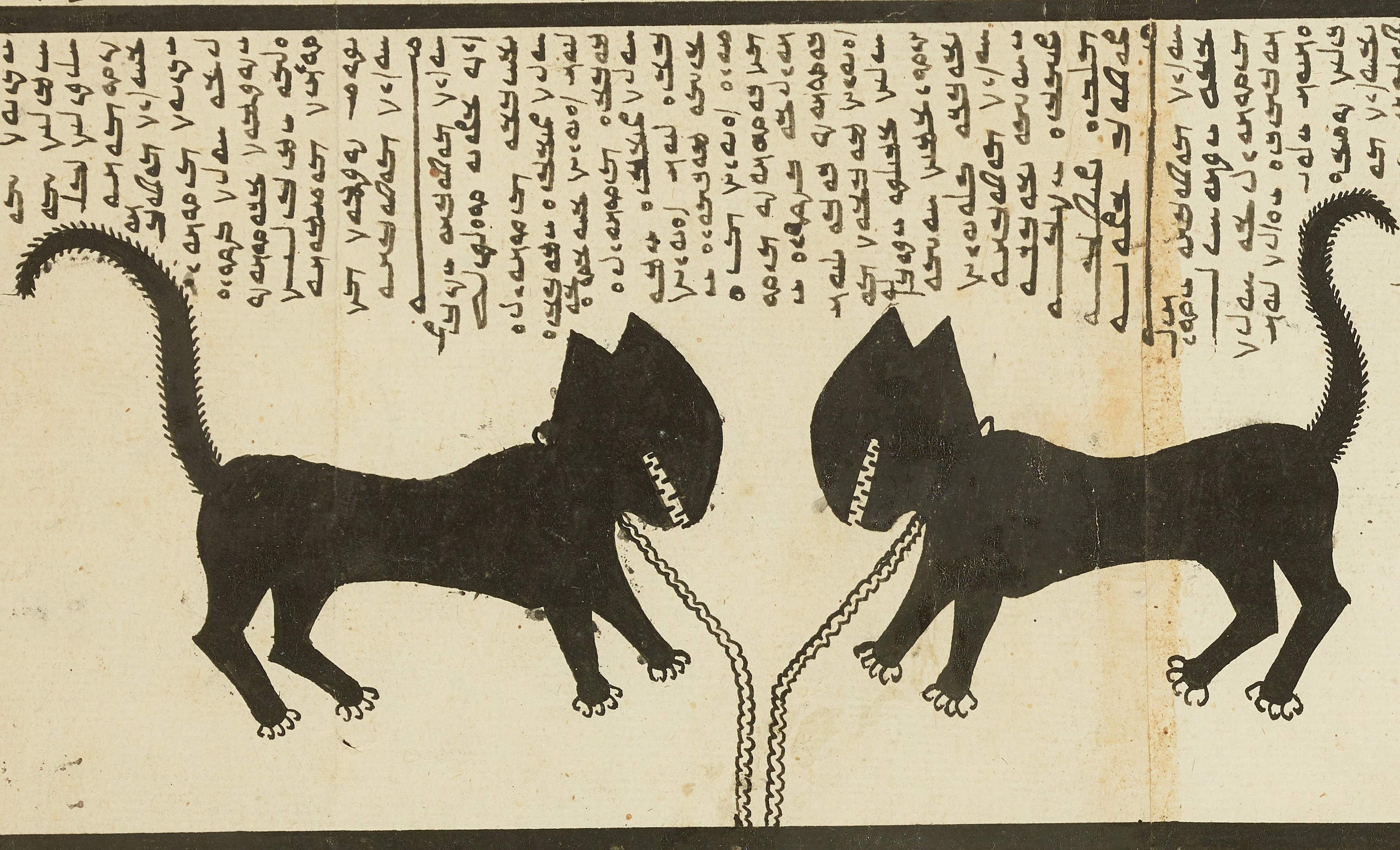
Two lions in the matarta of Kiwan

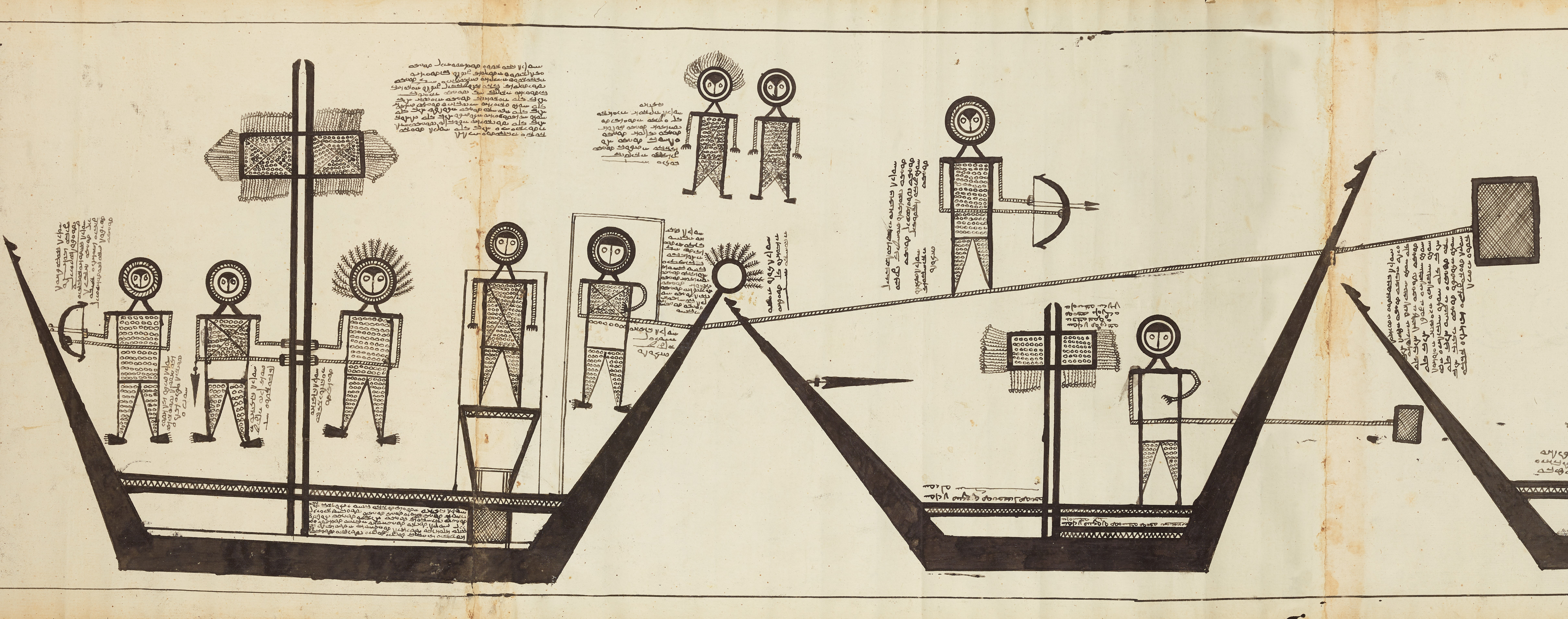
The sun-ship piloted by Ruha and demons.

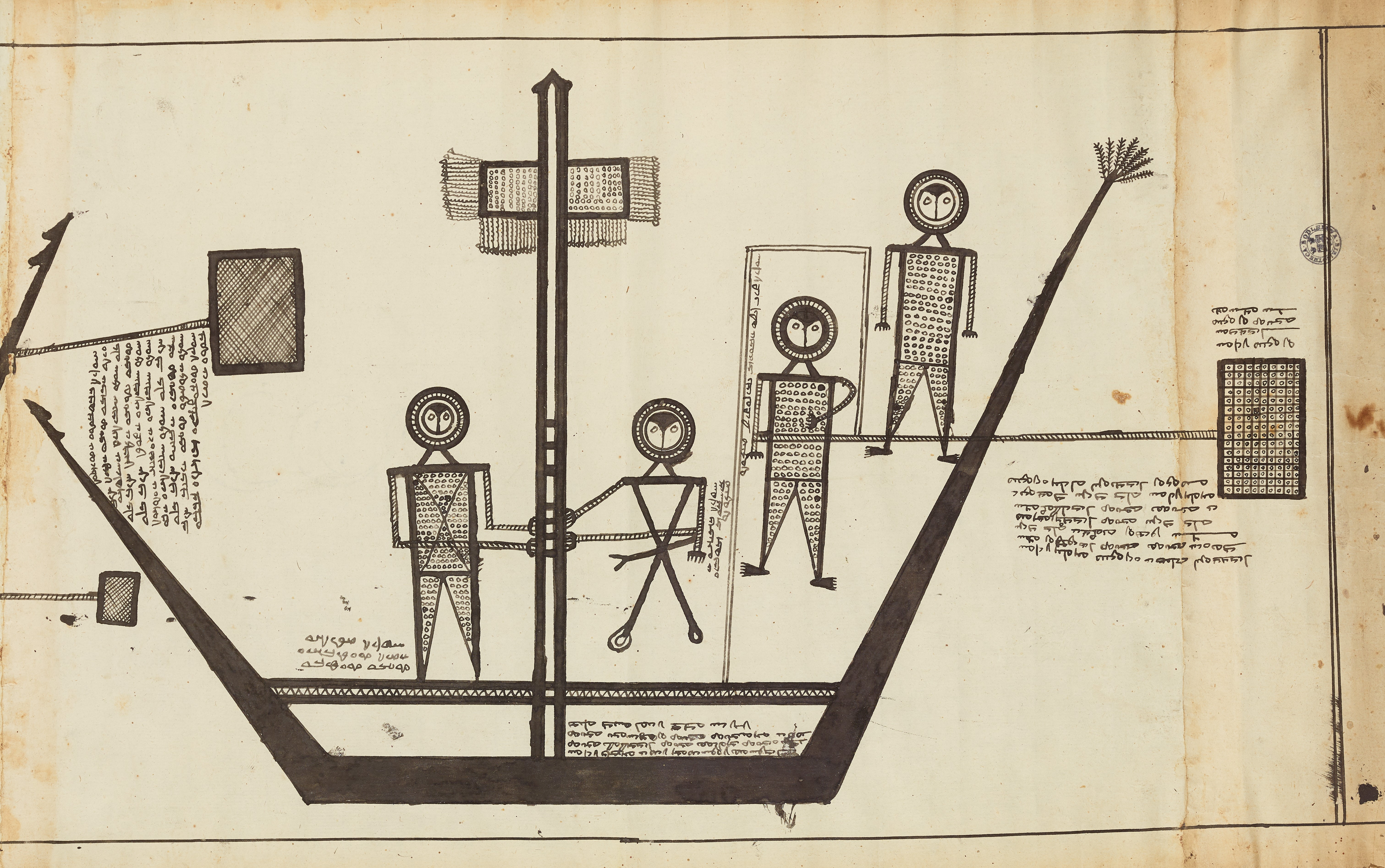
The moon-ship, piloted by members of the world of darkness such as planets.

== See also ==
- The Thousand and Twelve Questions
- Scroll of Exalted Kingship
- Ophite Diagrams
- Anubis
