= Shahrat =

Ship in Mandaeism

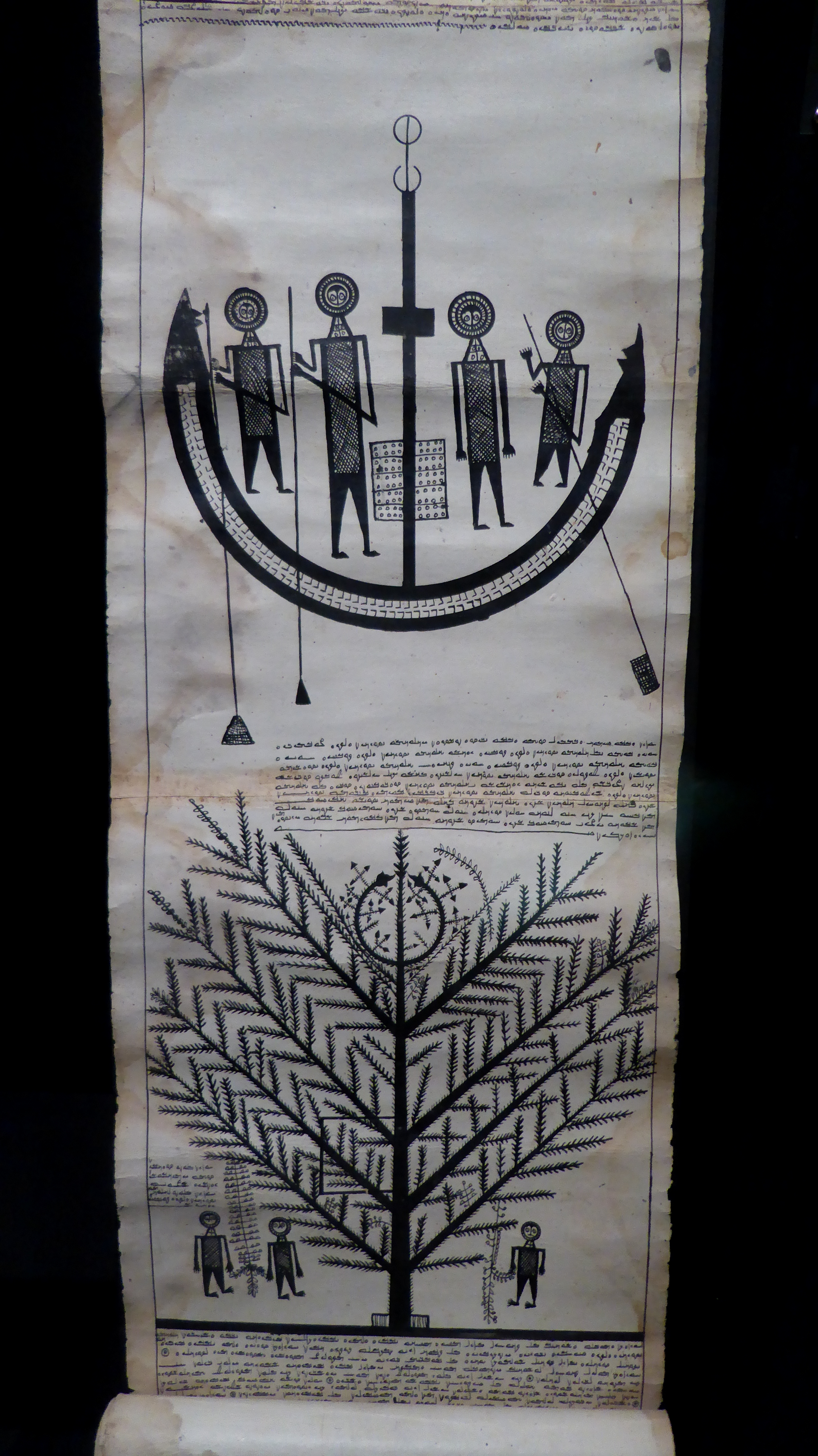
An 18th-century manuscript of the Scroll of Abatur in the Bodleian Library, Oxford. The illustration on top depicts the ship Shahrat ferrying Mandaean souls towards the house of Abatur, while the lower illustration shows the tree of Shatrin with the souls of unbaptized children.

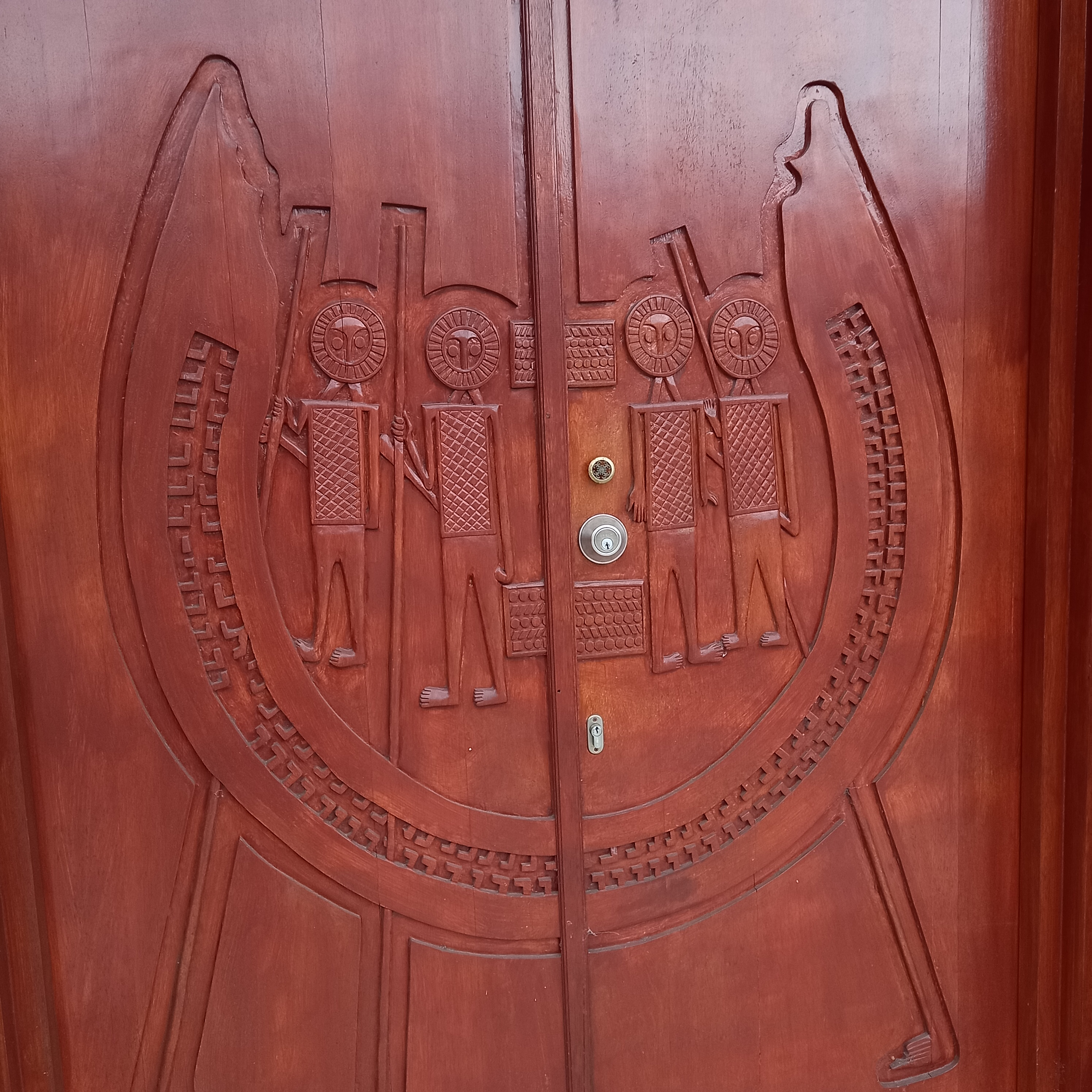
Carving of a ship carrying Mandaean souls, on the front door of Ganzibra Dakhil Mandi in Liverpool, New South Wales, Australia. It is based on the manuscript illustration above.

In Mandaeism, Shahrat (Classical Mandaic: ࡔࡀࡄࡓࡀࡕ, romanized: Šahrat, lit. 'she kept watch') is a ship or boat mentioned in the Scroll of Abatur. Shahrat ferries souls that are good and righteous from Tibil across the river Hitpun and into the house of Abatur, but if the soul is not righteous, it must walk on foot. According to the Mandaean priest Brikha Nasoraia (2021), it is basically a "space-ship" traveling "faster than the speed of light" through ayar (ether) to higher realms.

In Mandaean Book of John 55:60–61, the ship ferrying souls to the house of Abatur is described as follows.

I (Hibil Ziwa) made a ship for the good,
a ferry of souls carrying them,
over to Abatur's house,
who gives them strength and truth from head to toe.

== See also ==
- Hitfun
- Solar barque in ancient Egyptian mythology
- Charon, the ferryman of the underworld in Greek mythology
- Nibiru (Babylonian astronomy), "crossing" (especially of rivers)
