= Nishimta =

Soul in Mandaeism

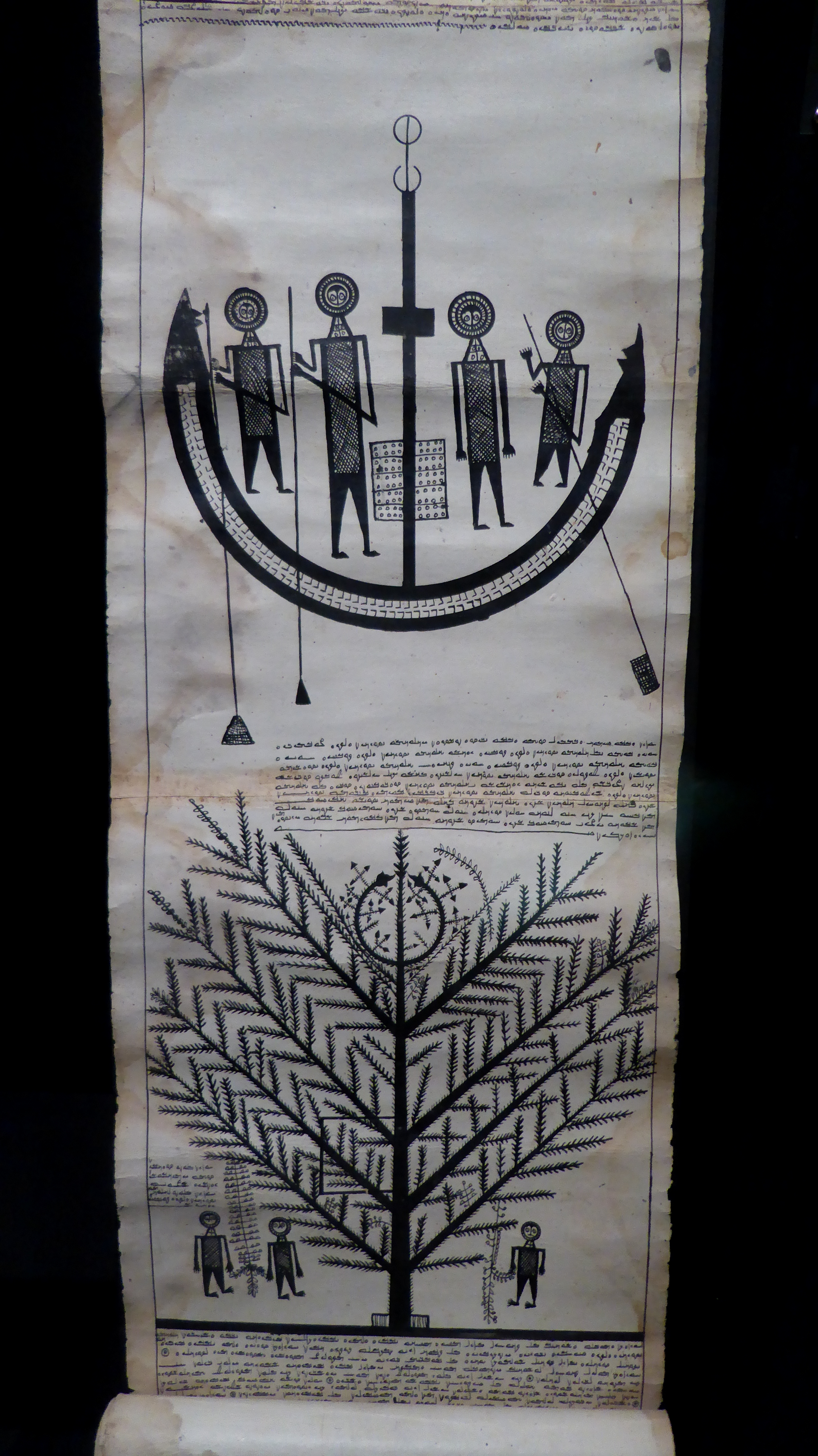
An 18th-century manuscript of the Scroll of Abatur in the Bodleian Library, Oxford. The illustration on top depicts the ship Shahrat ferrying Mandaean souls towards the house of Abatur, while the lower illustration shows the tree of Shatrin with the souls of unbaptized children.

In Mandaeism, the nishimta (Classical Mandaic: ࡍࡉࡔࡉࡌࡕࡀ nišimta, Modern Mandaic pronunciation: [nɪˈʃɪmtʰa]; plural: nišmata, Modern Mandaic pronunciation: [nɪʃˈmɑtʰa]) or nishma (Classical Mandaic: ࡍࡉࡔࡌࡀ nišma) is the human soul. It is can also be considered as equivalent to the "psyche" or "ego". It is distinct from ruha ('spirit'), as well as from mana ('nous'). In Mandaeism, humans are considered to be made up of the physical body (pagra), soul (nišimta), and spirit (ruha).

== In the afterlife ==
When a Mandaean person dies, priests perform elaborate death rituals or death masses called masiqta in order to help guide the soul (nišimta) towards the World of Light. In order to pass from Tibil (Earth) to the World of Light, the soul must go through multiple maṭarta (watch-stations, toll-stations, or purgatories; see also Arcs of Descent and Ascent and araf (Islam)) before finally being reunited with the dmuta, the soul's heavenly counterpart.

A successful masiqta merges the incarnate soul (Classical Mandaic: ࡍࡉࡔࡉࡌࡕࡀ nišimta; roughly equivalent to the psyche or "ego" in Greek philosophy) and spirit (Classical Mandaic: ࡓࡅࡄࡀ ruha; roughly equivalent to the pneuma or "breath" in Greek philosophy) from the Earth (Tibil) into a new merged entity in the World of Light called the ʿuṣṭuna ('trunk', a word of Indo-Iranian origin). The ʿuṣṭuna can then reunite with its heavenly, non-incarnate counterpart (or spiritual image), the dmuta, in the World of Light, where it will reside in the world of ideal counterparts (Mšunia Kušṭa).

== See also ==
- Sidra d-Nishmata (Book of Souls, the first part of the Qulasta)
- Ruha (spirit)
- Mana (Mandaeism) (nous)
- Nafs in Islam
- Jiva in Hinduism
- Ancient Egyptian conception of the soul
- Soul dualism
