= Journal of Near Eastern Studies =

The Journal of Near Eastern Studies
- Discipline: Middle Eastern studies
- Language: English

Publication details
- Former names: Hebraica, American Journal of Semitic Languages and Literatures
- History: 1884–present
- Publisher: University of Chicago Press for Near Eastern Languages and Civilizations, Division of the Humanities, University of Chicago (United States)
- Frequency: Biannual

Standard abbreviations
- ISO 4: J. Near East. Stud.

Indexing
- ISSN: 0022-2968
- JSTOR: 00222968
- OCLC no.: 859655365

Links
- Journal homepage

The Journal of Near Eastern Studies is an academic journal published by the University of Chicago Press, covering research on the ancient and medieval civilizations of the Near East, including archaeology, art, history, literature, linguistics, religion, law, and science. The Journal was founded in 1884 is a journal from the University of Chicago's Department of Near Eastern Languages and Civilizations. It currently publishes twice a year, in April and October. Since 1884, it has featured articles by scholars about the history, art, languages, philosophies, and religions of ancient Egypt and the Near East. There is also a book review section.

== See also ==
- ARAM Periodical
