= Ptahil =

Uthra (angelic being) in Mandaeism

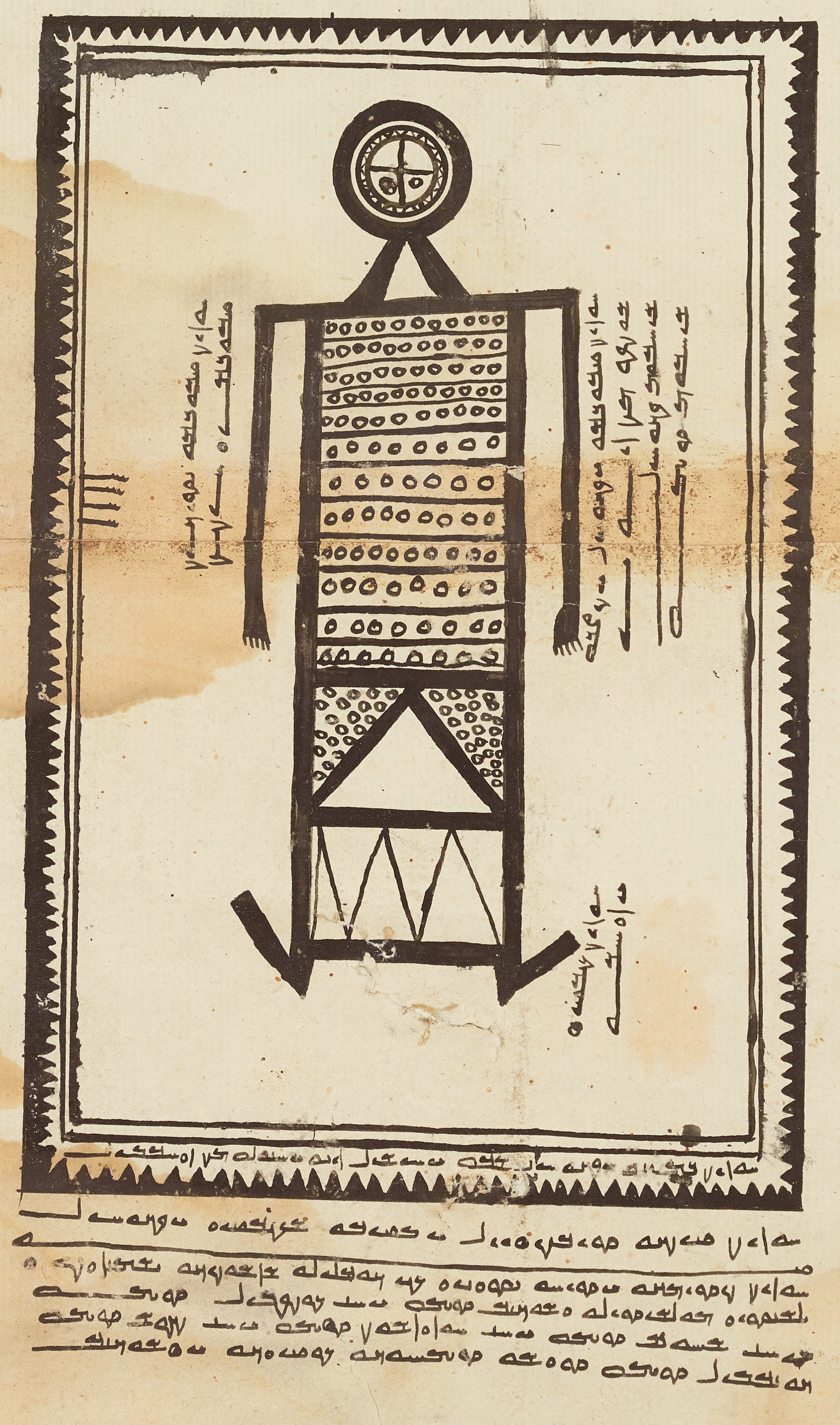
- Ptahil in the Scroll of Abatur (DC 8)
- Other names: Fourth Life
- Parents: Abatur, or Hibil and Zahreil

Equivalents
- Manichaean: Prince of Darkness

In Mandaeism, Ptahil (Classical Mandaic: ࡐࡕࡀࡄࡉࡋ, Modern Mandaic pronunciation: [əpθɑˈhil]), also known as Ptahil-Uthra (uthra, "angel, guardian"), is an uthra (celestial being). As the Fourth Life, he is the third of three emanations from the First Life (Hayyi Rabbi), after Yushamin and Abatur. Ptahil is often described as the Mandaean version of the demiurge.

== Etymology ==
Matthias Norberg believed the name Ptahil to be composed of Aramaic פתאה and עיל, therefore meaning "God opened", although the verb can also mean "create" in Mandaic, but not in other Aramaic languages. Subsequent scholars have deemed it more probably derived from the Egyptian theonym 'Ptah' and angelic 'il', as originally conjectured by Mark Lidzbarski, although Carl H. Kraeling argued that the influence of Ptah on Mesopotamian syncretic Gnostic traditions is minimal, and opined that the name Ptahil was derived from the dialectal use of the verb (which usage he suggested to have arisen by analogy to the opening of the cosmic egg), and not vice versa. According to James F. McGrath, Ptah and El were identified in Canaan during the era of Egyptian rule of which Ptahil may be derived from.

The name Ptḥiʾl (Hebrew: פתחיאל) is found in the Jewish text Sefer HaRazim, where he is listed among other angels who stand on the ninth step of the second firmament.

== Parentage ==
As the Fourth Life, Ptahil is considered to be the son of Abatur, the Third Life. However, in some versions of the narrative, Ptahil originated as the son of the saviour uthra Hibil Ziwa, who inhabits the World of Light, and Zahreil (ࡆࡀࡄࡓࡏࡉࡋ). As a result, Ptahil is also sometimes referred to as Ptahil bar Zahreil (Classical Mandaic: ࡐࡕࡀࡄࡉࡋ ࡁࡓ ࡆࡀࡄࡓࡏࡉࡋ), which means "Ptahil, son of Zahreil", in some prayers such as the Asut Malkia. Zahreil is a lilith (ࡋࡉࡋࡉࡕࡀ) from the World of Darkness who dwells in the beds of pregnant women serving to ensure the wellbeing of the child before and after birth; E. S. Drower describes her as a genius of childbirth. Hibil married Zahreil during his descent to the World of Darkness, although some versions of the narrative claim he did not consummate the marriage.

In the Mandaean Book of John, the uthra Yukašar is portrayed as the son of Ptahil.

== Role ==
Ptahil is identified with Gabriel and creates the poorly made material world with the help of Ruha, a sinful and fallen female ruler who inhabits the World of Darkness, but cannot provide man with a soul, since she represents the ambivalent "spirit" element rather than the light-world "soul" element. Ruha's and Ptahil's roles in creation vary, with each gaining control when the other's power subsides. The Great Life (Hayyi Rabbi) helped Abatur in gaining the secrets of solidification. Abatur in turn passes on the secrets to Ptahil so that he was successful in solidifying the earth in his role as creator of the material world. According to Brikha Nasoraia, the creation of the material world Tibil occurs by Hayyi Rabbi's command, but is delegated to a subservient emanation or uthra Ptahil with the assistance of Gabriel and others.

== See also ==
- Gabriel
- Ptah
- Prince of Darkness (Manichaeism)
- Yaldabaoth
