= Shitil =

Seth in Mandaeism

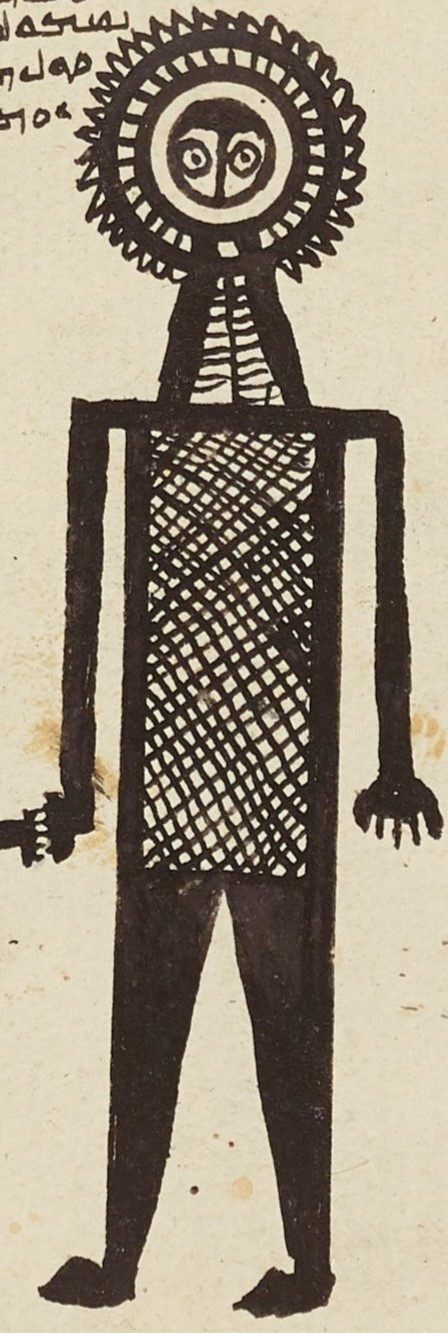
- Shitil in the Scroll of Abatur (DC 8)
- Other names: Sheetil
- Abode: World of Light
- Mantra: "In the name of Hibil, Šitil, and Anuš" (b-šumaihun ḏ-Hibil u-Šitil u-Anuš)
- Parents: Adam and Eve

Equivalents
- Jewish: Seth

In Mandaeism, Shitil (Classical Mandaic: ࡔࡉࡕࡉࡋ, romanized: Šitil, Modern Mandaic pronunciation: [ˈʃitɪl]) is an uthra (angel or guardian) from the World of Light. Shitil is considered to be the Mandaean equivalent of Seth.

Prayers in the Qulasta frequently contain the recurring formula, "In the name of Hibil, Šitil, and Anuš" (Classical Mandaic: ࡁࡔࡅࡌࡀࡉࡄࡅࡍ ࡖࡄࡉࡁࡉࡋ ࡅࡔࡉࡕࡉࡋ ࡅࡀࡍࡅࡔ b-šumaihun ḏ-Hibil u-Šitil u-Anuš).

== Overview ==
According to the Mandaean scriptures, including the Qulasta, the Book of John and Genzā Rabbā, the angelic soteriological figure Shitil is a son of Adam Qadmayya ("the first Adam") who taught John the Baptist with his brothers Anush (Enosh) and Hibil Ziwa (Abel). He is variously spoken of as a son of Adam, a brother or son of Hibil, and the brother or father of Anush. Sheetil is one of the revealers of Mandaeism, identified as the biblical Seth.

The Left Ginza mentions that Shitil was taken alive to the World of Light without a masiqta (death mass).

== See also ==
- List of angels in theology
- Setheus
