= Anush (Mandaeism) =

Uthra in Mandaeism

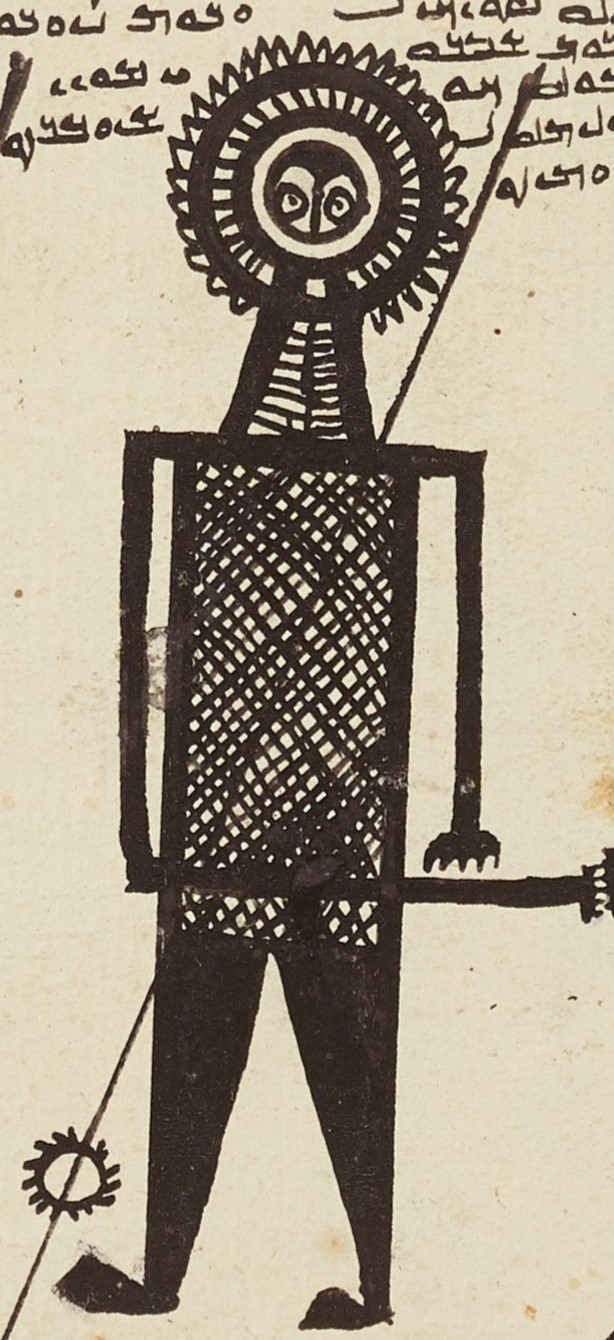
- Anush in the Scroll of Abatur (DC 8)
- Other names: Anush Uthra
- Abode: Mshunia Kushta in the World of Light
- Mantra: "In the name of Hibil, Šitil, and Anuš" (b-šumaihun ḏ-Hibil u-Šitil u-Anuš)

Equivalents
- Jewish: Enos

In Mandaeism, Anush (Classical Mandaic: ࡀࡍࡅࡔ, romanized: Anuš) (Neo-Mandaic: Ennosh, Modern Mandaic pronunciation: [ˈænnʊʃ]) or Anush Uthra (Classical Mandaic: ࡀࡍࡅࡔ ࡏࡅࡕࡓࡀ, romanized: Anuš ʿUtra) is an uthra (angel or guardian) from the World of Light. Anush is considered to be the Mandaean equivalent of Enos.

Prayers in the Qulasta frequently contain the recurring formula "In the name of Hibil, Šitil, and Anuš" (Classical Mandaic: ࡁࡔࡅࡌࡀࡉࡄࡅࡍ ࡖࡄࡉࡁࡉࡋ ࡅࡔࡉࡕࡉࡋ ࡅࡀࡍࡅࡔ b-šumaihun ḏ-Hibil u-Šitil u-Anuš).

The Mshunia Kushta is considered to be the shkina (dwelling) of Anush Uthra.

== Overview ==
According to the Mandaean scriptures, including the Qolastā, the Book of John and Genzā Rabbā, Enosh is cognate with the angelic soteriological figure Anush Uthra, (Classical Mandaic: ࡀࡍࡅࡔ ࡏࡅࡕࡓࡀ, romanized: Anuš ʿUtra, sometimes translated as "Excellent Ennosh"), who is spoken of as the son or brother of Shitil (Seth). Anush is a lightworld being (uthra) who taught John the Baptist and performed many of the same miracles within Jerusalem typically ascribed to Jesus by Christians.

== See also ==
- List of angels in theology
- Anush bar Danqa, a 7th-century Mandaean priest, scribe, and leader with the given name Anush
