= Hyperuranion =

Place in heaven in Greek philosophy

The hyperuranion or topos hyperuranios (Ancient Greek: ὑπερουράνιον τόπον, accusative of ὑπερουράνιος τόπος, "place beyond heaven"), which is also called the Platonic realm, is a place in heaven where all ideas of real things are collected together. As a perfect realm of Forms, the hyperuranion is within Plato's view that the idea of a phenomenon is beyond the realm of real phenomena and that everything we experience in our lives is merely a copy of a perfect model. It is described as higher than the gods since their divinity depended on the knowledge of the hyperuranion beings.

"But the region above the heaven (ὑπερουράνιον τόπον) was never worthily sung by any earthly poet, nor will it ever be ... For the colorless, formless, and intangible truly existing essence, with which all true knowledge is concerned, holds this region and is visible only to the mind, the pilot of the soul." (Plato, Phaedrus)

The hyperuranion doctrine is also a later medieval concept that claims God within the Empyrean exists outside of heaven and controls it as the prime mover from there for heaven even to be a part of the moved. The French alchemist Jean d'Espagnet rejected the idea of hyperuranion in his work Enchiridion, where he maintained that nature is not divided into conceptual categories but exists in unity.

== See also ==
- Mshunia Kushta in Mandaeism
- Popper's three worlds
- Third Realm (Frege)
