= Qarin =

Qarin may refer to:

- Qareen
- Qarin, Yemen
- House of Karen
