= Brikha Nasoraia =

Iraqi-Australian Mandaean priest and professor

Rishama Brikha H. S. Nasoraia
- بريخا هيثم سعيد ناصورايا
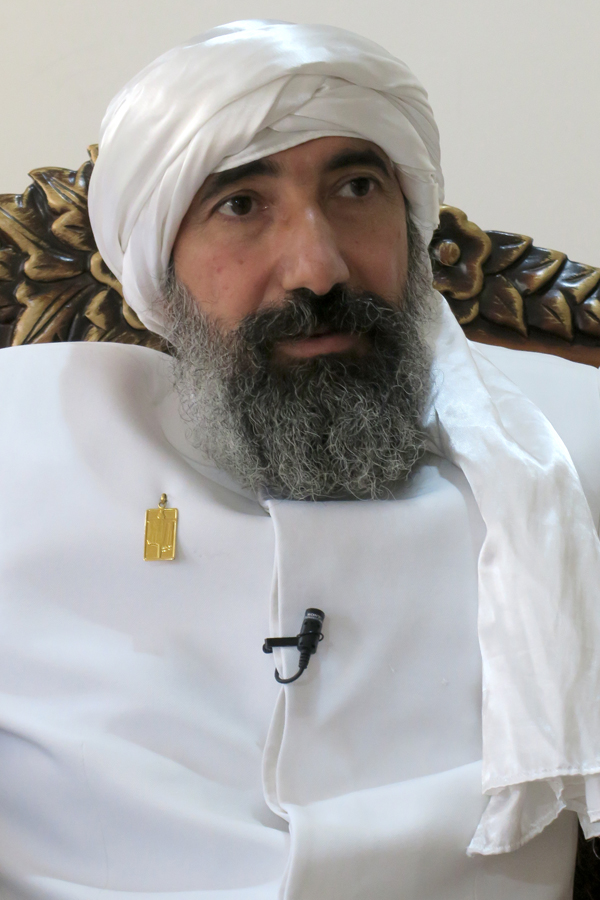
- Brikha Nasoraia in 2016
- Born: Haithem Mahdi Saed; 1964 (age 61–62); Iraq
- Other names: Brikha Hathem Saed Naṣoraia; Sam bar Sam Yuhana
- Occupations: Scholar and Mandaean priest
- Title: Rishama
- Spouse: Nadia al-Faris
- Children: 3
- Parent(s): Mahdi Saed (father); Layla Tamol (mother)

Academic background
- Education: University of Sydney (Ph.D.)
- Thesis: A critical edition with translation and analytical study of Diuan Qadaha Rba D-Dmuth Kušṭa (the Scroll of the Great Creation of the Image/Likeness of Truth) (2005)

Academic work
- Discipline: Religious studies
- Institutions: University of Sydney; Mardin Artuklu University
- Main interests: Mandaeism
- Notable works: The Mandaean gnostic religion (2021); The Mandaean Rivers Scroll (Diwan Nahrawatha) (2021)

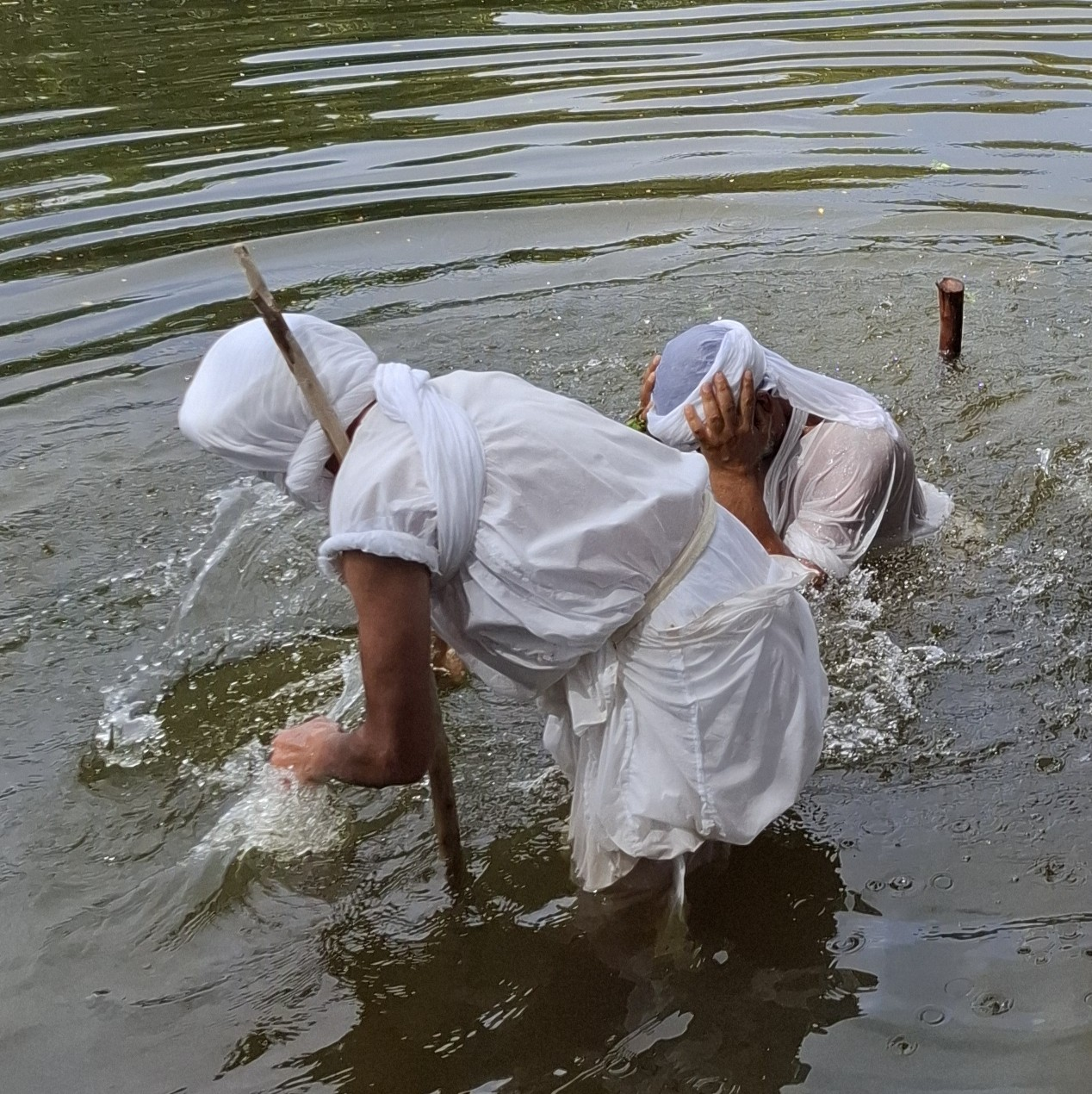
Rishama Brikha Nasoraia performing maṣbuta in the Georges River at Lighthorse Park in Liverpool, New South Wales, Australia during Parwanaya 2025

Rishama Brikha H. S. Nasoraia (full name: Brikha Haithem Saed Naṣoraia; Arabic: بريخا هيثم سعيد ناصورايا; born 1964 in Iraq) is an Iraqi-Australian Mandaean priest and scholar based in Sydney, Australia. He is affiliated with the University of Sydney and Mardin Artuklu University. He is currently a Professor of Comparative Semitics, Literature and Art History. Since July 2024, he has held the rank of rishama, the highest rank of the Mandaean priesthood.

== Early life and education ==
Brikha Nasoraia was born in Iraq to Mahdi Saed (father; Arabic: مهدي سعید) and Layla (mother). His Mandaean baptismal name is Sam bar Sam Yuhana (ࡎࡀࡌ ࡁࡓ ࡎࡀࡌ ࡉࡅࡄࡀࡍࡀ). He belongs to the Kuhailia (Choheili) family and can thus trace his ancestry back to Adam Zakia, the father of Bihram Bar-Hiia, who lived around 1500 A.D.

He was initiated into the Mandaean priesthood by Sheikh Abdullah, son of Sheikh Negm, of Baghdad. He was ordained as a ganzibra (Mandaean high priest) and later emigrated to Sydney, Australia, where he initially served with Ganzibra Salah Choheili. In 2005, he obtained a Ph.D. degree from the University of Sydney, where he wrote his doctoral dissertation on the translation and analysis of the Dmut Kušṭa scroll. After graduating from the University of Sydney, he later took the name Brikha Naṣoraia, which means "Blessed Naṣoraean" in Mandaic.

== Career ==
As a ganzibra (head priest), he is currently the President of the Mandaean Spiritual Council (or the Mandaean Nasoraean Supreme Council) of Australia and is also the President of the International Mandaean Nasoraean Supreme Council (or Nasoraean Mandaean Association).

Nasoraia lectures at the University of Sydney and also at Mardin Artuklu University in Mardin, Turkey.

Brikha Nasoraia's research interests include archaeology (particularly Mandaic lead rolls and incantation bowls), philosophy of religion, and translation of Mandaic manuscripts. In 1998, together with Majid Fandi Al-Mubaraki and his son Brian Mubaraki, he published a full printed version of the Ginza Rabba in typesetted Mandaic. He has participated in excavations at archaeological sites such as Harran.

He is fluent in English, Arabic, and Aramaic. Nasoraia is also an artist who produces oil paintings featuring Mandaean religious themes.

In late July 2024, Nasoraia was ordained as a Rishama. His ordination was attended by Rishama Sattar Jabbar Hilow and other Mandaean leaders. On 12 August 2024, his ordination was congratulated by Australian MP Anne Stanley.

== Personal life ==
He is married to Nadia al-Faris, with whom he has three children.

== Selected publications ==
Below is a partial list of publications by Brikha Nasoraia.

Note that in earlier works, he is cited as Haithem Saed Naṣoraia. Brikha (which means "blessed" in Mandaic) is a title that was later added to his name as cited in academic literature, Haithem is his given name, Mahdi is his father's name, and Saed is his grandfather's name. Naṣoraia is used to denote that he is a Nasoraean, i.e. a Mandaean priest. (See also Mandaean name.) As a result, he is also known as Sheikh (Rbai) Haithem Mahdi Saeed (Arabic: شيخ هيثم مهدي سعيد).

=== Books ===
- Al-Mubaraki, Majid Fandi; Rbai Haithem Mahdi Saeed; Brian Mubaraki (eds). 1998. Ginza Rba. Sydney, N.S.W., Australia. ISBN 0-646-35222-9.
- Nasoraia, Brikha H.S. (2021). The Mandaean gnostic religion: worship practice and deep thought. New Delhi: Sterling. ISBN 978-81-950824-1-4. OCLC 1272858968.
- Nasoraia, Brikha (2022). Masbuta: The Mandaean Baptism (forthcoming). Belgium: Brepols Publishers.
- Nasoraia, Brikha (2022). The Mandaean Rivers Scroll (Diwan Nahrawatha): an analysis. London: Routledge. ISBN 978-0-367-33544-1. OCLC 1295213206. (e-book: ISBN 978-0-367-33545-8)

=== Book chapters ===
- Nasoraia, Brikha H. S. (3 October 2018). "The Mandaeans: writings, ritual, and art". The Gnostic World. Routledge. pp. 187–199. doi:10.4324/9781315561608-17. ISBN 978-1-315-56160-8. S2CID 189539082.
- Shen, Haiyan; Nasoraia, Brikha H. S. (3 October 2018). "The discourse of truth in Chinese Tiantai Buddhism: "gnosis beyond gnosis"". The Gnostic World. Routledge. pp. 294–304. doi:10.4324/9781315561608-28. ISBN 978-1-315-56160-8. S2CID 171601222.

=== Journal articles ===
- Nasoraia, B., Crangle, E. (2010). The Asuta wish: Adam Kasia and the Dynamics of Healing in Mandaean Contemplative Praxis. ARAM Periodical, 22, 349-390. doi:10.2143/ARAM.22.0.2131045
- Crangle, E., Nasoraia, B. (2010). Soul Food: The Mandaean Laufani. ARAM Periodical, 22, 97-132.
- Nasoraia, B., Trompf, G. (2011). Mandaean Macrohistory. ARAM Periodical, 22(2010), 391-425. doi:10.2143/ARAM.22.0.2131046
- Trompf, G., Nasoraia, B. (2011). Reflecting on the 'Rivers Scroll'. ARAM Periodical, 22(2010), 61-86. doi:10.2143/ARAM.22.0.2131032
- Nasoraia, Brikha H. S. (2013). "Mandaean Sacred Art: A Brief Study of Folio 6 of the Secret Mandaean Scroll Diwan Qadaha Rba d-Dmuth Kušţa (The Scroll of Great Creation of the Image of Truth)". The International Journal of Religion and Spirituality in Society. 2 (4). Common Ground Research Networks: 33–45. doi:10.18848/2154-8633/cgp/v02i04/51025. ISSN 2154-8633.
- Shen, Haiyan; Nasoraia, Brikha H. S. (17 June 2017). "On Tiantai Zhiyi's Theory of the Three Categories of Dharma". Fudan Journal of the Humanities and Social Sciences. 11 (2). Springer Science and Business Media LLC: 237–256. doi:10.1007/s40647-017-0183-x. ISSN 1674-0750. S2CID 256393493.
