= Shatrin =

Tree in Mandaeism

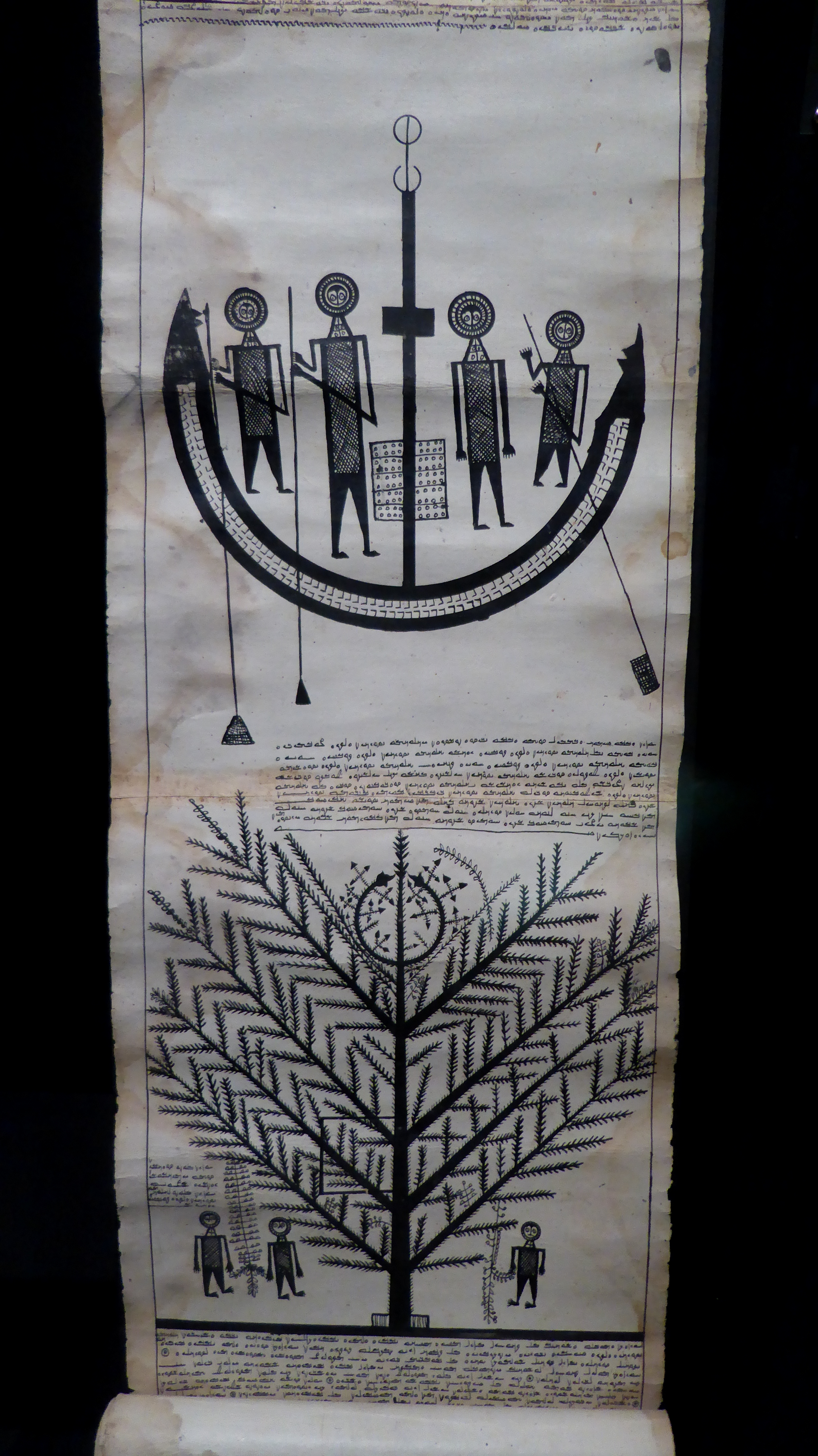
An 18th-century manuscript of the Scroll of Abatur in the Bodleian Library, Oxford. The illustration on top depicts the ship Shahrat ferrying Mandaean souls towards the house of Abatur, while the lower illustration shows the tree of Shatrin with the souls of unbaptized children.

In Mandaeism, Shatrin (Classical Mandaic: ࡔࡀࡕࡓࡉࡍ, romanized: Šatrin) is a heavenly tree mentioned in the Scroll of Abatur. Shatrin is where the souls of unbaptized Mandaean children are temporarily nourished for 30 days. On the 30th day, Hibil Ziwa baptizes the souls of the children, who then continue on to the World of Light. The tree has a length of 360,000 parasangs according to the Scroll of Abatur.

MS. Borgiani Siriaci 175 (held at the Vatican Library) and Drower Collection MS. 8 (held at the Bodleian Library in Oxford), two different manuscripts of the Scroll of Abatur, have illustrations of Shatrin that differ from those of each other.

== Other trees in Mandaean manuscripts ==
There are also many other heavenly trees illustrated in Mandaean manuscripts. Their names are typically those of uthras.

== See also ==
- Limbo
- Matarta
- Tree of life
- Five Trees in the Gospel of Thomas

In Islam

- Sidrat al-Muntaha
- Ṭūbā
- Zaqqum
