= Popper's three worlds =

Philosophical way of understanding reality

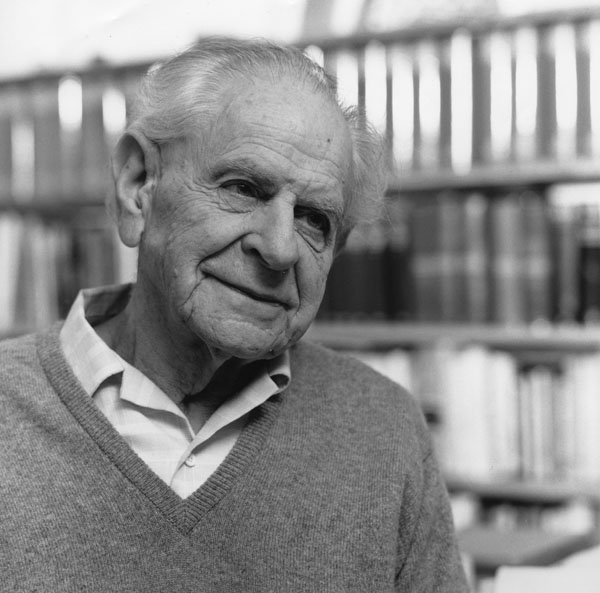
Popper in 1990. Karl Popper wrote two papers about the three worlds in the late 1960s.

Popper's three worlds is a theory developed by Karl Popper in the late 1960s. It involves three interacting worlds. World 1 is the material realm, World 2 is the mental realm, and World 3 is the cultural realm. Popper's goal was to defend his notion of objective knowledge against the rising notion that knowledge is a belief that must be justified and true. This theory supported his view that theories cannot be verified by induction. In his approach, the methodological rules as well as the logical content of science belong to World 3. The theory is evolutionary. Popper was a strong advocate of a theory of emergence in which each world is not predetermined by previous ones.

== Objective knowledge and inductionism ==
Popper introduced his notion of objective knowledge, essential in world 3, because testing theories is important in science. For Popper, "objective" did not imply "true" or "certain". On the contrary, for Popper, one value of objective knowledge is that it can be uncertain, progress and get closer to the truth through bold conjectures and their criticisms. Already at the time of his major work in philosophy of science, Logik der Forschung (1934), Popper rejected that scientific knowledge or its falsification had to be rigorously justified from observation. In the context of the fallibility of science, both of its laws and of their falsification, Popper distinguished rigorous logic from non-rigorous methodology and was thus able to discuss the role of deductive logic in science.

From the work of Russell in the early 20th century to that of Lakatos in the late 1960s, including that of Carnap and many others, empirical truth (valid correspondence with reality) has played a central role in distinguishing science from non-science. These works attempted to use inductive principles to logically evaluate laws or research programs from observations. Many approaches have been tried and then abandoned.

Popper argued that the role of observations in science lay not in logical justifications or induction, but in the evaluation or criticism of bold conjectures, in a methodology that has for goal the search for "truth." This methodology consists of rules that guide the overall scientific process. In falsificationism, this scientific process includes the introduction of auxiliary hypotheses which, to justify a claimed falsification, reject possibilities not considered in the initial condition. Popper was aware that the rules governing this process can hardly be rigorous, as they require problematic methodological decisions due to the Duhem–Quine thesis and other practical problems, while the logical aspect is rigorous.

Popper argued that even though rigorous logic cannot assess the empirical truth of laws as the inductivist research program attempted to do, it is nevertheless a necessary element in science. Already in the 1930s, Popper wrote that the bulk of scientific activity consists of using deductive logic to check the consistency of a theory, compare theories, check their empirical nature (i.e., falsifiability) and, most importantly, test a theory, which is possible only when it is falsifiable. He emphasized that, even when theories are tested against observations, deductive logic is largely used.

Already in the 1930s, Popper discussed the distinction between scientific objectivity and subjective conviction. It was only decades later that Popper would refer to scientific knowledge as objective knowledge in World 3, and describe this scientific activity as an interaction between World 2 and World 3 responsible for the growth of objective knowledge.

== Objective knowledge and justified true belief ==
Popper's main objective in introducing World 3 in the late 1960s was to "provoke" those whom he called "belief philosophers", those who are "interested in our subjective beliefs, and their basis or origin". In the early 1960s, reinforced by Tarski's semantic theory of truth, which he saw as a way to describe a correspondence theory of truth, he contrasted the subjective or psychological theory of knowledge with an objective theory of knowledge, in which direct correspondence with reality is a "regulative principle". This correspondence was not a tool for justification, but it clarified the notion of objective knowledge. In the same period, especially after Gettier presented two simple counterexamples to the notion of knowledge as justified true belief, the problem of the logical validation of our knowledge, then essentially identified with scientific knowledge, shifted to that of the analytical definition of knowledge in terms of its components: beliefs, truth, justification, and, possibly, other requirements. Musgrave wrote "Epistemologists interested in certainty, in justified true belief, were bound to find the rich speculations of natural science extraordinarily problematic. In the vain pursuit of certainty, epistemologists were forced to withdraw from the world of natural science." As early as the late 1950s, Popper expressed the idea that the most interesting problems in epistemology concerned scientific knowledge, not knowledge in general or ordinary knowledge, which he considered too narrow. David Miller noted that, for Popper, knowledge is neither justified nor believed, and that, generally, scientific knowledge is not true (in any logical sense). Musgrave wrote that "Popper’s theory of science, and his cure for relativism, rest upon his rejection of the traditional theory of knowledge as justified true belief."

Popper appreciated the scientific value of analyzing mental states from a biological or psychological perspective, but considered it uninteresting in his epistemology. In particular, he was much impressed by Bolzano's view on objective knowledge. The idea of Popper's objective knowledge is based on the fact that, although the notion of "truth" (in the informal sense of correspondence with reality) is a regulative principle, knowledge is at no point evaluated as true or false in this sense, because Popper accepted the theses of Duhem and Hume, who asserted that this was impossible. Rather, knowledge is considered an objective resource for human beings, just as birds' nests, spiders' webs, and so on, are resources for animals. Therefore, the question of how to reject or accept knowledge in this philosophy is not intended to receive a rigorous answer. A methodology is proposed for that purpose and considered part of objective knowledge, but Popper asserts that it can hardly be rigorous. The methodological rules as well as the rigorous logical content of science belong to World 3. This objective knowledge is evaluated for its usefulness in its applications through critical discussions. This contrasts with the notion of belief, which must also be true, even justified, to qualify as knowledge.

== The three worlds ==
The numbering of the three worlds reflects their temporal order of emergence, each realm emerging as a product of the development of previous realms. A one-word description of each realm is that World 1 is the material realm, World 2 is the mental realm, and World 3 is the cultural realm.

Popper's theory is evolutionary. Popper maintains that at the inception of the universe there was only a "World 1", a realm where everything consisted of physical states and processes. A "World 2" of mental life later emerged as a product of biological evolution. Subsequently a "World 3" of cultural objects emerged as a product of evolution of the human "World 2". Popper was a strong advocate of a theory of emergence in which each world is not predetermined by previous ones. Against this, Popper argues that we should instead see the universe as "creative" and non deterministic, and as having given rise to genuinely new levels or realms - like biological life, "World 2" and "World 3". The three worlds may be understood, in terms of this evolutionary framework, as containing three categories of entity:

- World 1: the realm of states and processes as studied by the natural sciences. These include the states and processes that we seek to explain by physics and by chemistry, and also those states and processes that subsequently emerge with life and which we seek to explain by biology.
- World 2: the realm of mental states and processes. These include sensations and thoughts, and include both conscious and unconscious mental states and processes. World 2 includes all animal as well as human mental experience. These mental states and processes only emerge as a product of biological activity by living organisms, and so only emerged subsequent to the emergence of living organisms within World 1. Mental states and processes are the products of evolutionary developments in the World 1 of animal brains and nervous systems, but constitute a new realm of World 2 that co-evolved by its interaction with the World 1 of brains and nervous systems.
- World 3: the realm of the 'products of thought' when considered as objects in their own right. These products emerge from human "World 2" activity, but when considered as World 3 objects in their own right they have rebound effects on human World 2 thought processes. Through these rebound effects, World 3 'objects' may - via World 2-based human action on World 1 - have an indirect but powerful effect on World 1. In Popper's view, World 3 'objects' encompass a very wide range of entities, from scientific theories to works of art, from laws to institutions.

== More on World 3 ==
Popper says that his World 3 has much in common with Plato's theory of Forms or Ideas. Objects may exist in World 3 without embodiments in World 1. But, World 3 is not to be conceived as a Platonic realm, because unlike the Platonic world of forms, which is non changing and exists independently of human beings, Popper's World 3 is created by human beings and is not fixed. It corresponds to the current state of our knowledge and culture.

Popper makes two key claims regarding the role of World 3 in the known universe. First, Popper argues that, despite the many continuities and correspondences between the human and animal World 2, (1) only humans consider their mental products as objects in their own right in a World 3 sense and (2) only humans have access to World 3 objects. Second, World 3 has no direct effect on World 1 but only affects World 1 as mediated by the human World 2. For example, a theory of nuclear reactions will never of itself cause a nuclear reactor to be built, yet the existence of a nuclear reactor is not the result of a purely World 1 process but is the eventual product of complex interactions between particular World 3 theories and human World 2 mental activity, and also particular World 2 and World 1 mind-brain-body interactions, leading to particular World 1 human actions (to construct a nuclear reactor) only made feasible by this complex set of interactions.

== The interaction of World 1 and World 2 ==
The theory of interaction between World 1 and World 2 is an alternative theory to Cartesian dualism, which is based on the theory that the universe is composed of two essential substances: res cogitans and res extensa. Popperian cosmology rejects this essentialism, but maintains the common sense view that physical and mental states exist, and they interact.

== The interaction of World 2 and World 3 ==
An example of interaction between World 2 and World 3 is that, through the process of learning, World 3 transforms World 2. In the other direction, through the publication of scientific results, World 2 transforms World 3. Popper wrote "it is through this interaction between ourselves and World 3 that objective knowledge grows." The entire process of science and its use of deductive logic is part of this interaction. Popper argued that this process cannot be studied if this interaction is ignored.

== The interaction of World 3 and World 1 ==
Some World 3 objects are embodied in World 1. For example, Hamlet as a World 3 object is embodied many times in World 1. But, this representation of an object of World 3 in World 1 is not considered an interaction in Popper's view. Instead, for Popper, because World 3 is a world of abstractions, it can only interact with World 1 through World 2.

== See also ==
- Collective consciousness
- Eccles' philosophy
- George Berkley
- Subjective idealism
- Four worlds
- Platonic realm
- Third Realm (Frege)
- Trichotomy (philosophy)
