= Gubran =

Uthra in Mandaeism

- Other names: Gubran Uthra
- Abode: World of Light
- Battles: battle against Yushamin
- Consort: Guban

In Mandaeism, Gubran (Classical Mandaic: ࡂࡅࡁࡓࡀࡍ, Modern Mandaic pronunciation: [gowˈrɑn]) is an uthra (angel or guardian). He is also referred to as Gubran Uthra. Guban is the female consort of Gubran.

== In Mandaean scriptures ==
In the Mandaean Book of John, Gubran Uthra helps Nbaṭ lead a rebellion against Yushamin and his 21 sons. Chapter 3 mentions Gubran's vehicle as Paraheil, a heavenly steed or warhorse.

Gubran is also mentioned in Right Ginza 5.1 as one of the uthras appointed over the north by Yawar Ziwa to watch over Ur.

== See also ==
- Nbat
- Nsab
- List of angels in theology
