= Yukabar =

Uthra in Mandaeism

- Other names: Yukhabr
- Abode: World of Light

Yukabar (also Yukhabr; Classical Mandaic: ࡉࡅࡊࡀࡁࡀࡓ, Modern Mandaic pronunciation: [juˈkʰɑwar]) is an uthra (angel or guardian) in the World of Light. He is the envoy of life who raises up the soul, and is also called Yukabar-Manda-Hiia (Yukabar Manda Hayyi).

== In Mandaean scriptures ==
Yukashar is mentioned in Qulasta prayers 74, 77, 173, and 379. In Right Ginza 15.6, he is mentioned as Yukabar-Kušṭa, and in Right Ginza 16.4 and 17.1 as Yukabar-Ziwa.

Yukabar helps Nbaṭ fight a rebellion against Yushamin in the Mandaean Book of John.

== See also ==
- List of angels in theology
