= Nbat =

Uthra in Mandaeism

Nbaṭ
- Other names: Nbaṭ Rba; Nbaṭ Ziwa
- Abode: World of Light
- Army: Gubran, Yawar, Bihram, and Yukabar
- Battles: Leader of the battle against Yushamin

In Mandaeism, Nbaṭ (Classical Mandaic: ࡍࡁࡀࡈ, lit. 'Sprout', Modern Mandaic pronunciation: [ənˈbɑtˤ]) is an uthra (angel or guardian) who is described as the "King of Air" or the "first great Radiance." He is also called Nbaṭ Rba ("the Great Nbaṭ" or "Great Sprout") or Nbaṭ Ziwa "the Radiant Nbaṭ", literally "Radiance Burst Forth". In The Thousand and Twelve Questions , he is also known as Kušṭa Yaqra "Solemn Truth".

Nbaṭ is associated with fertility and life.

== In Mandaean scriptures ==
In chapter 3 of the Mandaean Book of John, Nbaṭ and the uthras Gubran, Yawar, Bihram, and Yukabar lead a rebellion against Yushamin and his 21 sons, who are led by ʿtinṣib Ziwa ("Transplant") and his elder brother Sam. Yawar slays 12 of Yushamin's sons, while Bihram slays 9 of them.

Right Ginza Book 14 is named after Nbaṭ and is called the Book of the Great Nbaṭ (or Sidra ḏ-Nbaṭ Rba in Mandaic). The book considers Nbaṭ to be the initial "sprout" that had sprung out during the beginning of the creation of the universe, and also depicts the uthra Yawar as having emerged from Nbaṭ during the creation.

Nbaṭ is also mentioned in Qulasta prayers 22, 25, 374, and 376.

In The Thousand and Twelve Questions, Nbat is described as the "Father of uthras, the Celestial King of Light." He is also mentioned as the father of Shishlam (Drower 1960: 113–114) and as the father of Hibil Ziwa (Drower 1960: 158).

== See also ==
- Nsab
- Titanomachy
- List of angels in theology
