= Scroll of the Rivers =

Religious text of Mandaeism

Diwan ḏ-Nahrawata Scroll of the Rivers
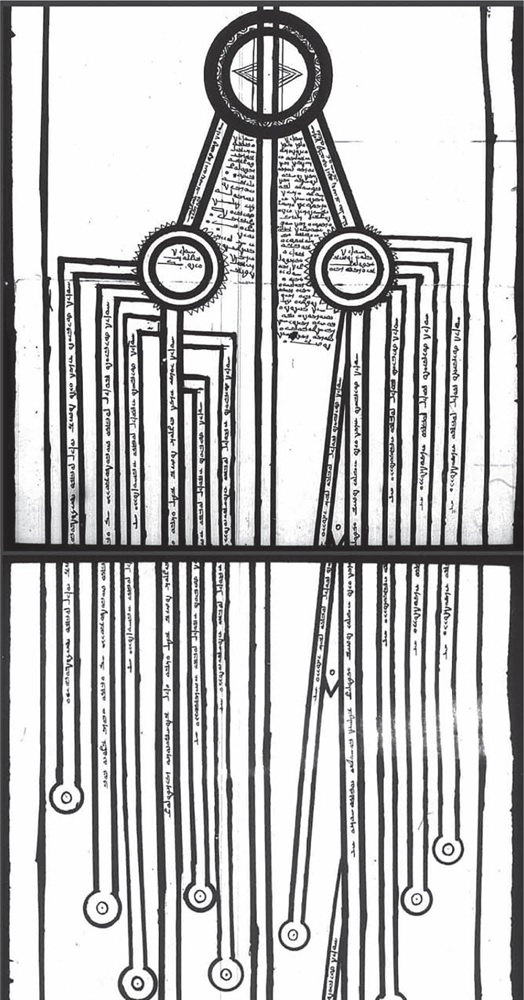
- Rivers branching from a single source in Diwan ḏ-Nahrawata

Information
- Religion: Mandaeism
- Language: Mandaic language

Diwan ḏ-Nahrawata or Diuan ḏ-Nahrauata (Classical Mandaic: ࡃࡉࡅࡀࡍ ࡖࡍࡀࡄࡓࡀࡅࡀࡕࡀ, lit. 'Scroll of the Rivers') is a Mandaean religious text. It is written as an illustrated scroll.

== Contents ==
The scroll contains esoteric schematic diagrams of the cosmos. Well-springs (Classical Mandaic: ࡀࡉࡍࡀ, romanized: aina) are shown as small circles, mountains as triangles, and rivers (including the Tigris, Euphrates, and Karun) as long straight lines. Zamzam Well is also depicted. Illustrations in the scroll depict Hibil Ziwa as the grand mediator and messenger of the Life.

== Manuscripts and translations ==
E. S. Drower obtained a copy of the text and later donated it to the Bodleian Library at Oxford University, where it was catalogued as Manuscript 7 of the Drower Collection (abbreviated DC 7). A typesetted Mandaic version of DC 7 was published by Majid Fandi Al-Mubaraki in 2002. In 2022, Brikha Nasoraia published an English translation and analysis.

Nasoraia (2022) lists four known manuscripts of the scroll, which he labels Mss A, B, C, and D. Only Mss A and B were previously known to Western scholars.

- Ms A (also known as DC 7): dated 1259 AH (1843 CE) and written in Shushtar by Ram Zihrun. 538.76 cm long by 12.25 cm wide. 12 pages (each approximately 44 cm long) attached together as a scroll. Analyzed by Kurt Rudolph.
- Ms B: also known as the Baghdad manuscript (from the library of Ganzibra Shaikh Dakhil Aidan), dated 1336 AH (1917 CE), from Ahvaz. Photocopied by the German Assyriologist Manfred Müller in 1975. Analyzed by Kurt Rudolph.
- Ms C: copied in Iraq in 1948 and contains many errors.
- Ms D: copied in Qurnah, Basrah by Rbai Sam son of Adam, in 1192 AH (1779 CE). This is the oldest known manuscript.

Diwan Nahrawata is a geographical treatise that focuses mainly on esoteric cosmology. Kurt Rudolph published a German translation in 1982, based on Ms B, a copy held in Dakhil Aidan's private library in Dora, Baghdad that was originally from Ahvaz. It has about 3300 words and was copied by Ram Zihrun, son of Sam Bihram, Kupašia in Shushtar, Iran in 1259 A.H. (1843 A.D.).

The scroll contains illustrations of several uthras, including the female uthras Simat Hiia and Ezlat.
