= Mshunia Kushta =

Section of the Mandaean World of Light

In Mandaean cosmology, Mshunia Kushta (Classical Mandaic: ࡌࡔࡅࡍࡉࡀ ࡊࡅࡔࡈࡀ, romanized: Mšunia Kušṭa, lit. 'realm of truth') is a part of the World of Light considered to be the dwelling place of heavenly or ideal counterparts (dmuta). It is similar to Plato's concept of the hyperuranion (realm of Forms), which can be roughly described as a place in heaven where all ideas of real things are collected together.

Mshunia Kushta is considered to be the shkina (dwelling) of Anush Uthra according to Book 2 of the Right Ginza.

== See also ==
- Hyperuranion in Platonism
- Theory of forms in Platonism
- Abstract and concrete
- Adam Kasia
