= ARAM Periodical =

Academic journal by Peeters in Belgium

- Discipline: Ancient Near East studies, Aramaic studies
- Language: English
- Edited by: Shafiq Abouzayd

Publication details
- History: 1989–present
- Publisher: Aram Society for Syro-Mesopotamian Studies
- Frequency: Annual

Standard abbreviations
- ISO 4: ARAM Period.

Indexing
- ISSN: 0959-4213 (print); 1783-1342 (web)
- LCCN: 93650421
- OCLC no.: 20688477

Links
- Journal homepage; Online archive at Peeters Publishers

The ARAM Periodical is an annual peer-reviewed academic journal published by the Aram Society for Syro-Mesopotamian Studies covering Ancient Near East studies with a particular focus on Aramaic studies, including archaeology, religious studies, philology, patristics, and other related topics.

== History ==
The ARAM Society for Syro-Mesopotamian Studies was founded at the University of Oxford on 24 January 1987. The society published the first volume of its periodical in 1989. From 1995 to 2012 the journal was published by Peeters Publishers on behalf of the society. Originally published biannually, the journal switched to annual publication in 2000.

== Abstracting and indexing ==
The journal is abstracted and indexed in the ATLA Religion Database, L'Année philologique, Linguistic Bibliography, and the Modern Language Association Database.
