= Nsab =

Uthra in Mandaeism

Nṣab
- Other names: Nṣab Rba; Nṣab Ziwa
- Abode: World of Light

Genealogy
- Parents: Yushamin (father)
- Consort: Anan-Nṣab

In Mandaeism, Nṣab (Classical Mandaic: ࡍࡑࡀࡁ, lit. 'Plant', Modern Mandaic pronunciation: [ənˈsˤɑb]) is an uthra (angel or guardian). He is also called Nṣab Rba ("the Great Nṣab") or Nṣab Ziwa ("the Radiant Nṣab" or "Splendid Plant"). Nṣab and Anan-Nṣab ('cloud of Nṣab', a female consort) are frequently mentioned together as a pair in the Right Ginza and Qulasta.

== In the Mandaean Book of John ==
In chapters 3 to 10 of the Mandaean Book of John, Nṣab is a son of Yushamin.

In the fourth chapter, Nṣab Ziwa (Classical Mandaic: ࡍࡑࡀࡁ ࡆࡉࡅࡀ, lit. 'Splendid Plant') admonishes his father Yushamin over his rebellion.

The eighth chapter gives an account of Nṣab bringing a petition for forgiveness for Yushamin to the King of Light (malka ḏ-nhura), who accepts it against the wishes of Manda d-Hayyi, and cautions the latter for hating Yushamin for refusing him a wife. The ninth is a dialogue between Yushamin, Manda d-Hayyi and Nṣab; the tenth is a monologue by Yushamin.

== In other Mandaean scriptures ==
Nṣab is mentioned in chapters 8 and 17.1 of the Right Ginza. He is also mentioned in Qulasta prayers 25, 71, 105, 145, 168, 186, 353, and 379.

In the Baptism of Hibil Ziwa (DC 35), Nṣab is the name of a heavenly tree.

== See also ==
- Nbat
- Titanomachy
- List of angels in theology
