= Yushamin =

Uthra (angelic being) in Mandaeism

- Other names: Second Life
- Abode: World of Light
- Offspring: Abatur, Sam, Yukabar, Etinṣib, Nṣab

In Mandaeism, Yushamin (Note: Romanised spellings vary considerably between translators and commentators but include Yōšamin (Sabah Aldihisi), Joshamin (Carl H. Kraeling), Yushamin (Qais and Hamed Al-Saadi), Jōšamīn (Mark Lidzbarski), Yušamin (E. S. Drower), Yushamen (Charles Häberl and James F. McGrath) and Juschamin (Matthias Norberg). Earlier translation drafts by Häberl use Yoshamin or Iušamin.) (Classical Mandaic: ࡉࡅࡔࡀࡌࡉࡍ, Modern Mandaic pronunciation: [juˈʃɑmɪn]), also known as the Second Life, is the primal uthra (angel or guardian) and a subservient emanation who was created by the Mandaean God 'The Great Life' (Hayyi Rabbi or 'The First Life'), hence beginning the creation of the material world. Yushamin is the father of Abatur. Jorunn J. Buckley identifies Yushamin as "both a Lightworld utra beyond reproach and the prototype of a priest who has made mistakes in ritual."

== Name and epithets ==
The name Yušamin may be derived from the divine name Yao plus šmayn "heaven". In The Baptism of Hibil Ziwa, he is called the "pure Yušamin", "Yušamin the Peacock", and "Yušamin, son of Dmut-Hiia", where Dmut-Hiia/Dmuth-Hayyi ("Likeness/Image of Life") refers to Yushamin's mother. The connections between the descriptions of "Yušamin the Peacock" in Mandaean cosmology and the analogous Yezidi deity, the Peacock Angel (Tawûsî Melek), understood as the first emanation of the supreme God, have been demonstrated by the Yezidologist Artur Rodziewicz.

In many prayers of the Qulasta, he is known as "Yushamin the Pure" (Classical Mandaic: ࡉࡅࡔࡀࡌࡉࡍ ࡃࡀࡊࡉࡀ, romanized: Yušamin Dakia).

== Role ==
=== Rebellion ===
Yushamin and his sons set in motion the events leading to creating the material world (tibil), due to deciding to participate in creation without consulting the First Life; this is accounted in book 3 of the Right Ginza. The first ten chapters of the Mandaean Book of John give further accounts related to the progress of the rebellion of Yushamin and his sons against the King of Light (malka ḏ-nhura, i.e. Hayyi Rabbi), and their eventual reconciliation against the wishes of Manda d-Hayyi.

In the first two chapters, Kushta asks questions which are answered by Ptahil and his son Yukashar (ࡉࡅࡊࡀࡔࡀࡓ). Yushamin is mentioned in the first chapter as having set the eternal great conflict in motion, and in more detail in the second as having revealed the secret of the Great, and been cast down due to starting a fight with the Light, or the Mighty's house, lacking concern and humility, in contrast to Yukabar (ࡉࡅࡊࡀࡁࡀࡓ) having brought calm.

In the third chapter, twenty-one of the sons of the captive Yushamin, excluding the elder brother Sam (ࡎࡀࡌ) but including his favourite son Yukabar and led by Etinṣib Ziwa (Classical Mandaic: ࡏࡕࡉࡍࡑࡉࡁ ࡆࡉࡅࡀ, lit. 'Splendid Transplant'), start a battle against Nbaṭ (Classical Mandaic: ࡍࡁࡀࡈ, lit. 'Sprout'), the King of Air, and are slaughtered upon the arrival of the forces of the King of Light. An irate Yushamin breaks his bonds and proceeds from the Nether Gate to the Realm of Air, destroying all in his wake and defeating the uthri, until Hayyi binds him again by the Nether Gate in 904 chains of zeynā (ࡆࡀࡉࡍࡀ).

In the fourth chapter, Nṣab Ziwa (Classical Mandaic: ࡍࡑࡀࡁ ࡆࡉࡅࡀ, lit. 'Splendid Plant') admonishes his father Yushamin over his rebellion. In the fifth chapter, Hayyi sends Manda d-Hayyi to admonish Yushamin over his plots to overthrow him, who responds with threats of defeating Manda d-Hayyi had Yushamin come to Manda d-Hayyi as opposed to the latter having been sent as a messenger; the exceedingly brief sixth chapter contrasts this with a throned, non-captive Yushamin revering Manda d-Hayyi as the King of the Uthri.

The seventh chapter recapitulates the rebellion of Yushamin and his sons. The eighth chapter gives an account of Nṣab bringing a petition for forgiveness for Yushamin to the King of Light, who accepts it against the wishes of Manda d-Hayyi, and cautions the latter for hating Yushamin for refusing him a wife. The ninth is a dialogue between Yushamin, Manda d-Hayyi and Nṣab; the tenth is a monologue by Yushamin.

=== Hibil's descent ===
Yushamin is dispatched to interrogate Hibil Ziwa's identity and permit him re-entry to the World of Light when he returns from his descent to the World of Darkness.

=== Other ===
According to E. S. Drower, in documents giving ritual instruction, Yushamin serves as the spiritual prototype of a priest who makes errors in conducting a ritual.

== Parallels ==
The story of Yushamin in Mandaeism is one of the parallels to the Christian Gnostic story of Sophia, since both seek to create without the consent of the supreme deity, thereby starting the process of creating the material world. However, the origin of the demiurgic (Ptahil) is attributed to Abatur, the Third Life, and the fallen Sophia pending redemption parallels Ruha.

== See also ==
- List of angels in theology
- Sophia (Gnosticism)
- Titanomachy
