= Abatur =

Uthra (angelic being) in Mandaeism

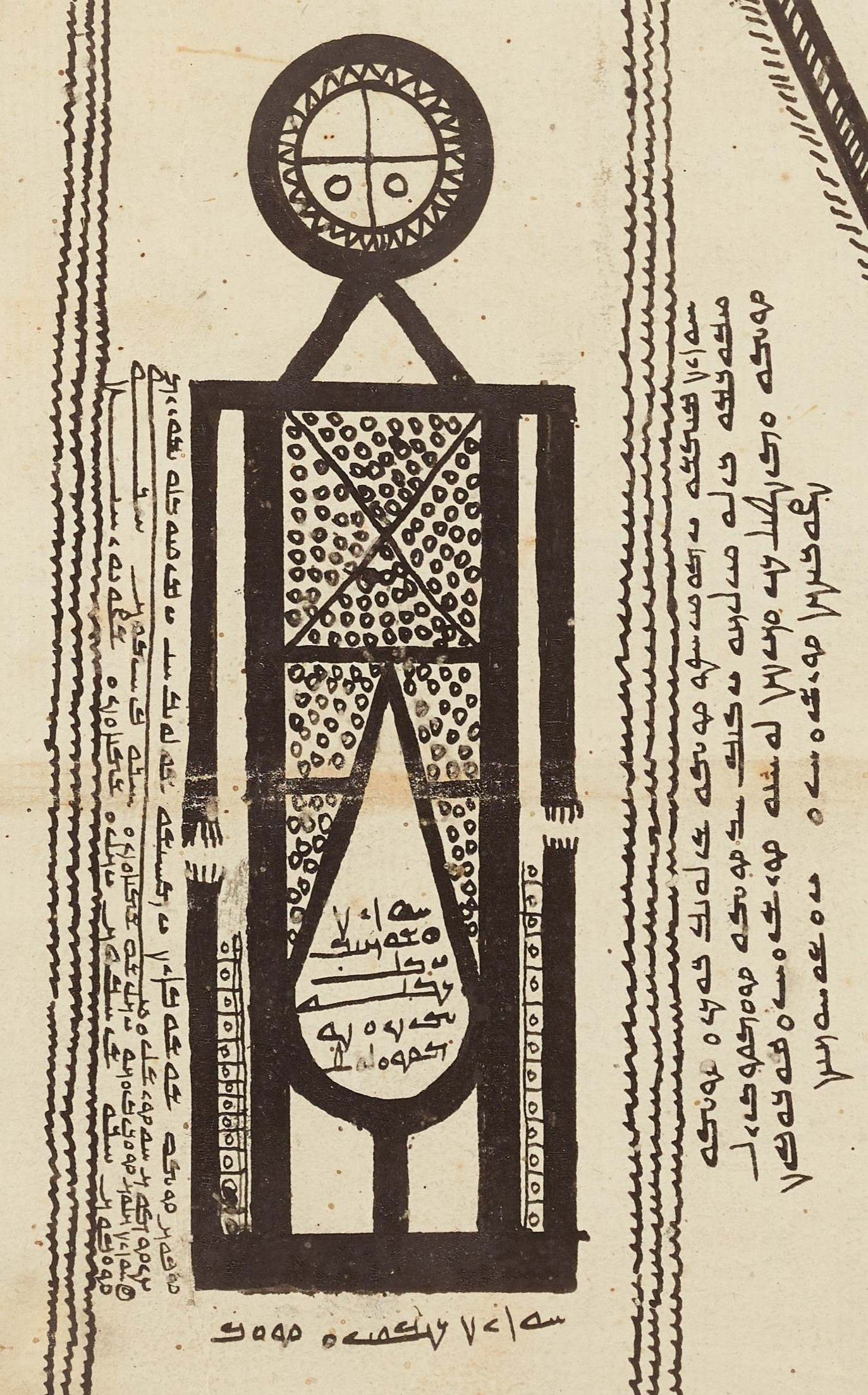
- Image of Abatur from Diwan Abatur
- Other names: Third Life, Abatur Rama, Abatur Muzania, Bhaq Ziwa
- Abode: World of Light
- Symbol: Scales
- Texts: Diwan Abatur
- Parents: Yushamin
- Offspring: Ptahil

Equivalents
- Egyptian: Anubis
- Zoroastrian: Rashnu

Abatur (ࡀࡁࡀࡕࡅࡓ, also Abathur or Awāthur, Modern Mandaic pronunciation: [aˈwɑtar]) is an uthra and the second of three subservient emanations created by the Mandaean God Hayyi Rabbi (ࡄࡉࡉࡀ ࡓࡁࡉࡀ, “The Great Living God”) in the Mandaean religion. His name translates as the "father of the Uthras", the Mandaean name for angels or guardians. His usual epithet is the Ancient (ˁattīqā) and he is also called "the deeply hidden and guarded". Also known as the Third Life, Abatur is described as being the son of the first emanation Yushamin (ࡉࡅࡔࡀࡌࡉࡍ). He is also described as being the angel of Polaris.

He exists in two different personae. These include Abatur Rama (Classical Mandaic: ࡀࡁࡀࡕࡅࡓ ࡓࡀࡌࡀ, romanized: Abatur Rama, lit. 'the "lofty" or celestial Abatur', Modern Mandaic pronunciation: [aˈwɑtar ˈrɑmɑ]), and his "lower" counterpart, Abatur of the Scales (Classical Mandaic: ࡀࡁࡀࡕࡅࡓ ࡌࡅࡆࡀࡍࡉࡀ, romanized: Abatur Muzania, Modern Mandaic pronunciation: [aˈwɑtar muˈzænia]), who weighs the souls of the dead to determine their fate. In Mandaean texts such as the Qulasta, Abatur is sometimes referred to as Bhaq Ziwa.

== Etymology ==
Charles G. Häberl (2022) etymologizes Abatur as abbā ḏ-ʿoṯri 'father of the excellencies', since he translates uthra as 'excellency.'

The name "Abiṭur", possibly a variant of Abatur, has been found inside a Jewish incantation bowl. In Sefer HaRazim, a 4th-century Jewish magical text, Ibiṭur is the name of an angel serving the angelic prince Asimur in the first heaven.

== Abatur in Diwan Abatur ==
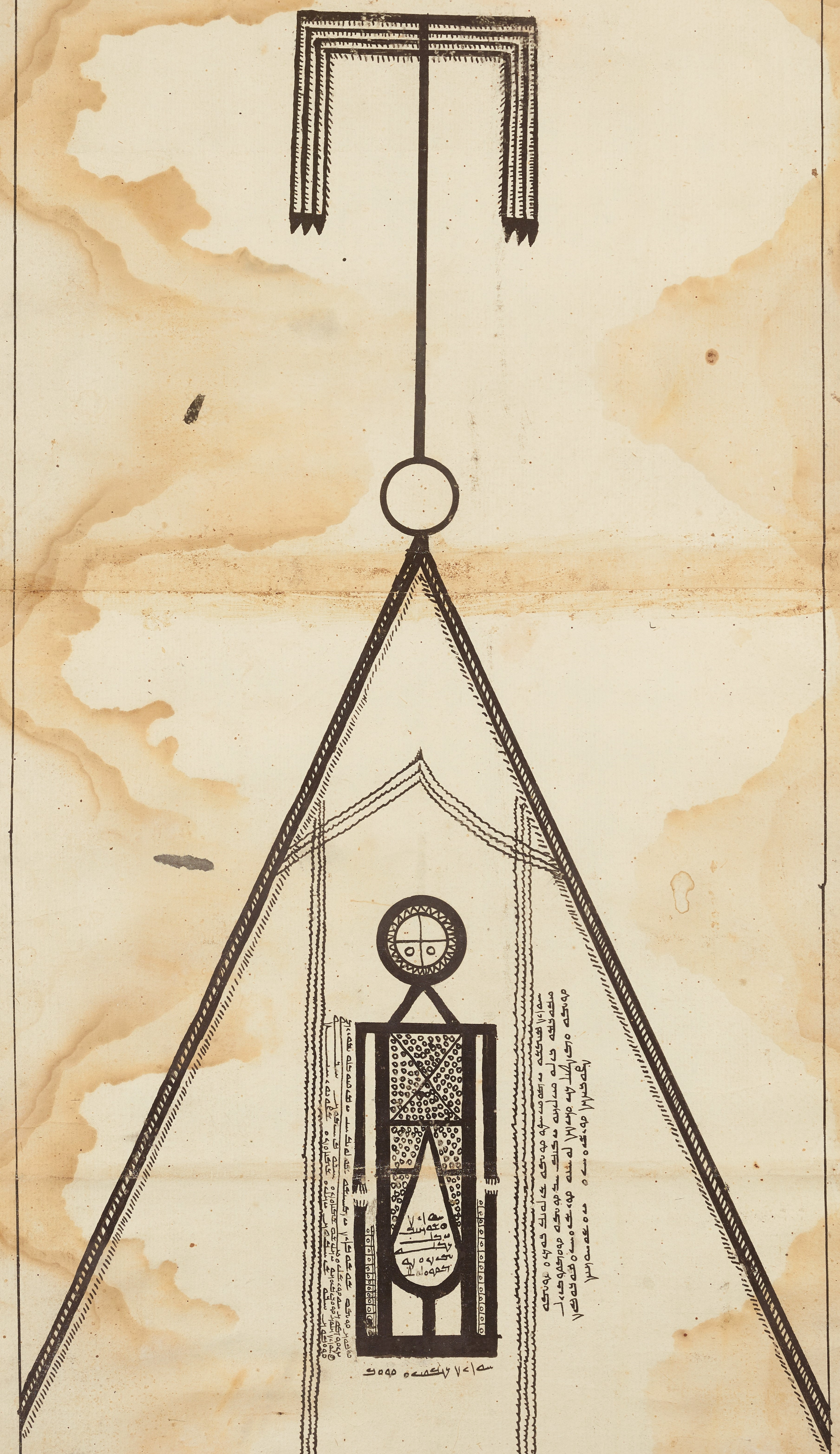
Illustration of Abatur at the scales from Diwan Abatur

He is one of the main characters in the Scroll of Abatur, one of the more recent texts of the Mandaeans. The text begins with a lacuna. He is said to reside on the borderland between the here and the hereafter, at the farthest verge of the World of Light that lies toward the lower regions. Beneath him was initially nothing but a massive void with muddy black water at the bottom, in which his image was reflected. The existing text starts with Hibil (ࡄࡉࡁࡉࡋ, an envoy from the World of Light) telling Abatur to go and reside in the boundary between the World of Light and the World of Darkness, and weigh for purity those souls which have passed through all the matarta (spiritual toll houses) and wish to return to the light.

Abatur is unhappy with the assignment, complaining that he is being asked to leave his home and his wives to do this task. Instead, Abatur impatiently asks questions regarding specific sins of omission and sins of commission, asking how such impure souls can be saved. Hibil then answers these questions in a rather lengthy response.

A later section of the book reveals that Abatur is the source of Ptahil (ࡐࡕࡀࡄࡉࡋ), who fills the role of the demiurge in Mandaean cosmology. The book indicates how Abatur gives Ptahil-uthra precise instructions on how to create the material world (Tibil, ࡕࡉࡁࡉࡋ) in the void described above, and gives him the materials and help (in the form of demons from the World of Darkness) he needs to do so. Ptahil, like Abatur before him, complains about his assignment but does as he is told. The world he creates is very dark, unlike the World of Light from which Abatur and the others come.

After the material world is created, the Primordial Adam asks Abatur what he will do when he goes to Tibil. Abatur answers that Adam will be helped by Manda d-Hayyi, who instructs humans with sacred knowledge and protects them. This enrages Ptahil, who dislikes Abatur giving a degree of control of his creatures to someone else, and he complains bitterly about it in much the same way that Abatur had complained about his assignment to Hibil Ziwa.

He subsequently serves as a judge of the dead, in much the same capacity as Rashnu and Anubis. Those souls who qualify can enter the World of Light from which Abatur himself came. Hibil will only allow him to return to the World of Light upon the end of the poorly made material world that Ptahil created.

== Imagery ==
Images of the Mandaean beings tend to be of a blocky style vaguely reminiscent of European cubism. This imagery, allowing for stylistic differences of individual artists, is consistent throughout the illustrated diwans. None of the celestial beings shown has any fleshy or material bodies, and this may play a part in the non-representative nature of their depictions. In the surviving images in the Diwan Abatur, Abatur is depicted sitting on a throne. Both Abatur and Ptahil are depicted as having faces divided into quarters, with what seem to be eyes in the lower two quarters of the face. Some have interpreted this as indicating that they both have to look down upon the earth.

== See also ==
- Ancient of Days (ʿattīq yōmīn) in Judaism
- Metatron in Judaism
- Anubis in Egyptian mythology
- Avatar in Hinduism
- Rashnu in Zoroastrianism
- List of angels in theology
