= Bereshit (parashah) =

First weekly Torah portion

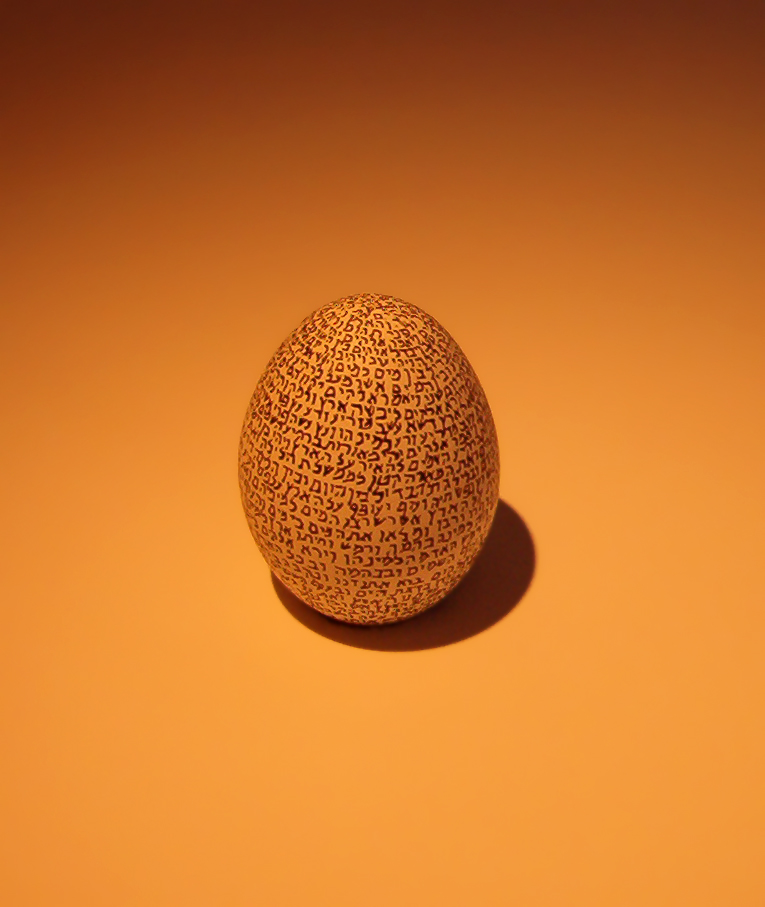
The first chapter of the book of Genesis written on an egg at the Israel Museum

Bereshit, Bereishit, Bereshis, Bereishis, or B'reshith (בְּרֵאשִׁית—Hebrew for "in beginning" or "in the beginning," the first word in the parashah) is the first weekly Torah portion (פָּרָשָׁה, parashah) in the annual Jewish cycle of Torah reading. The parashah consists of Genesis 1:1–6:8. In the parashah, God creates the heavens, the world, Adam and Eve, and Sabbath. A serpent convinces Eve, who then invites Adam, to eat the fruit of the tree of the knowledge of good and evil, which God had forbidden to them. God curses the ground for their sake and expels them from the Garden of Eden. One of their sons, Cain, kills his brother Abel out of jealousy. Adam and Eve have other children, whose descendants populate the Earth. Each generation becomes more and more degenerate until God decides to destroy humanity. Only one person, Noah, finds God's favor.

The parashah is made up of 7,235 Hebrew letters, 1,931 Hebrew words, 146 verses, and 241 lines in a Torah Scroll (Sefer Torah). Jews read it on the first Sabbath after Simchat Torah, generally in October, or rarely, in late September or early November. Jews also read the beginning part of the parashah, Genesis 1:1–2:3, as the second Torah reading for Simchat Torah, after reading the last parts of the Book of Deuteronomy, Parashat V'Zot HaBerachah, Deuteronomy 33:1–34:12.

In traditional Sabbath Torah reading, the parashah is divided into seven readings, or עליות, aliyot. In a Masoretic Text of the Tanakh (Hebrew Bible), Parashat Bereishit has ten "open portion" (פתוחות, petuḥot) divisions (roughly equivalent to paragraphs, often abbreviated with the Hebrew letter פ (pe)). Parashat Bereshit has several further subdivisions, called "closed portion" (סְתוּמוֹת, setumot) divisions (abbreviated with the Hebrew letter ס (samekh)) within the open portion divisions. The first seven open portion divisions set apart the accounts of the seven phases of creation in the first reading. The eighth open portion spans the second and third readings. The ninth open portion contains the fourth, fifth, sixth, and part of the seventh readings. The tenth open portion corresponds to the maftir (concluding reading, מפטיר). Closed portion divisions further divide the third, fourth, sixth, and seventh readings.

== First reading—Genesis 1:1–2:3 ==
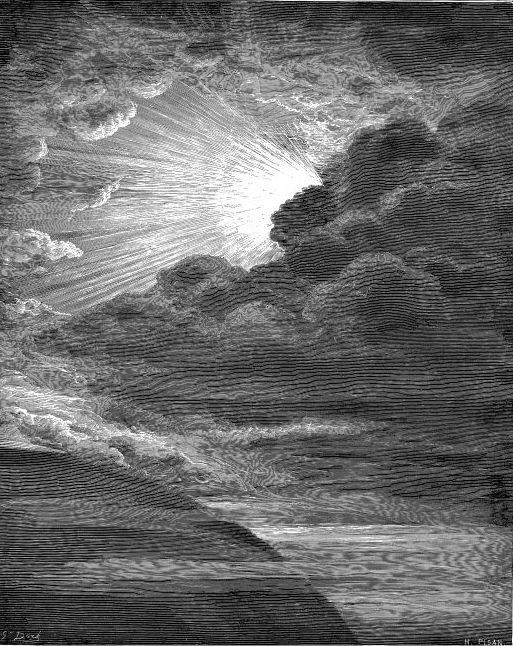
Creation of Light (engraving by Gustave Doré from the 1865 La Sainte Bible)

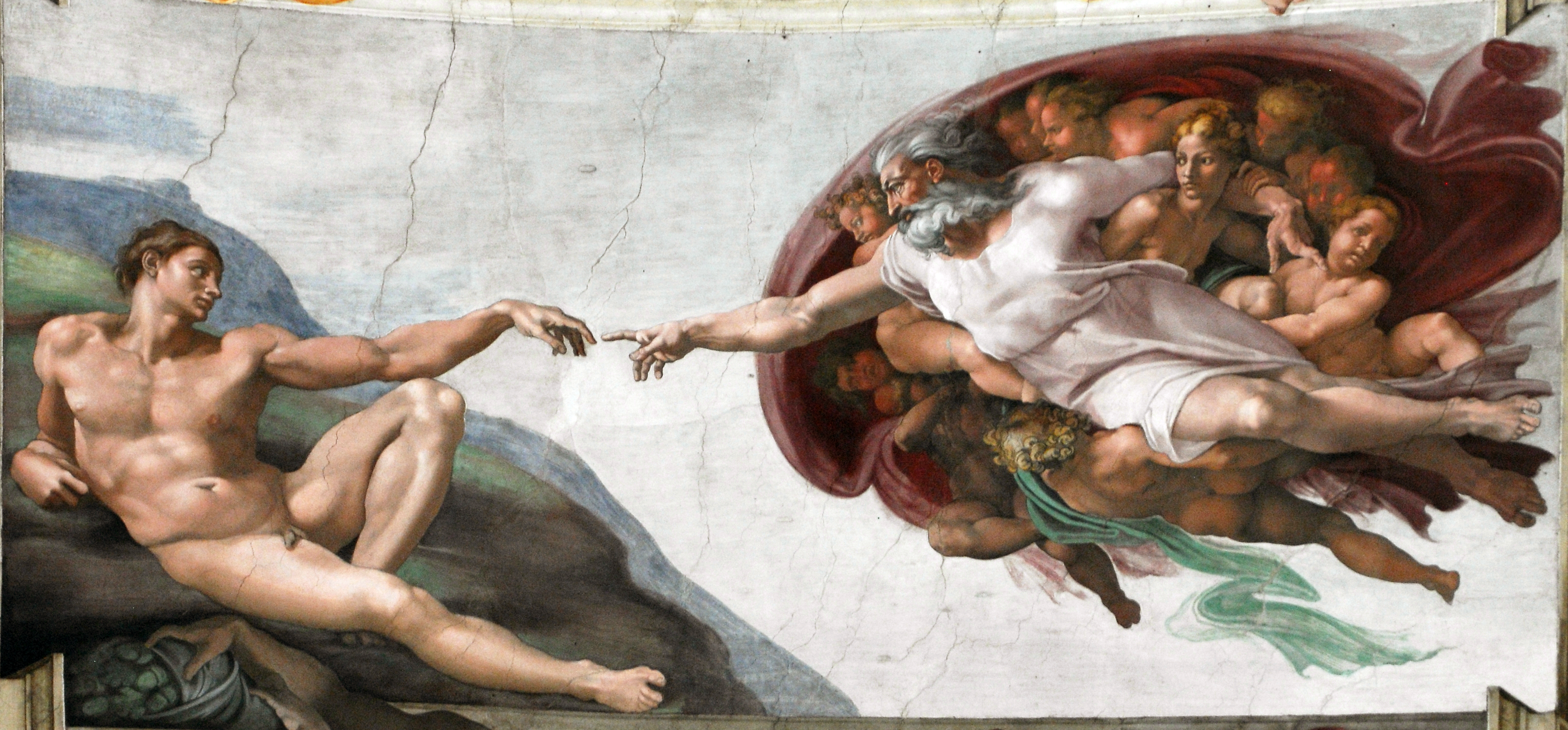
The Creation of Adam (fresco circa 1509 by Michelangelo in the Sistine Chapel)

The first reading reports God's creation of the heaven and earth. The earth was unformed and void (תֹהוּ וָבֹהוּ, tohu wa-bohu), darkness was over the surface of the deep, and the Spirit of God moved on the face of the water. (Genesis 1:1, Genesis 1:2.) God spoke and created, in six phases—literally "days":

- First phase: God spoke light into existence and separated light from darkness. The first open portion ends with the end of verse 5. (Genesis 1:3, Genesis 1:4, Genesis 1:5.)
- Second phase: God created a firmament in the midst of the waters and separated the waters from the firmament. The second open portion ends here with the end of verse 8.
- Third phase: God gathered the water below the sky, creating land and sea, and God caused vegetation to sprout from the land. The third open portion ends here with the end of verse 13.
- Fourth phase: God set lights in the sky to separate days and years, creating the sun, the moon, and the stars. The fourth open portion ends here with the end of verse 19.
- Fifth phase: God had the waters bring forth living creatures in sea along with the birds of the air and blessed them to be fruitful and multiply. The fifth open portion ends here with the end of verse 23.
- Sixth phase: God had the earth bring forth living creatures from the land, and made humankind in God's image, male and female, giving them dominion over the animals and the earth, and blessed them to be fruitful and multiply. God gave vegetation to them and the animals for food and declared all creation "very good". The sixth open portion ends here at the end of chapter 1.
- Seventh phase: God ceased work and blessed the seventh phase, declaring it holy. The first reading and the seventh open portion end after the seventh phase (Genesis 2:3).

=== Classical rabbinic interpretation ===
The parashah is discussed in these rabbinic sources from the era of the Mishnah and the Talmud:

==== Time before creation ====
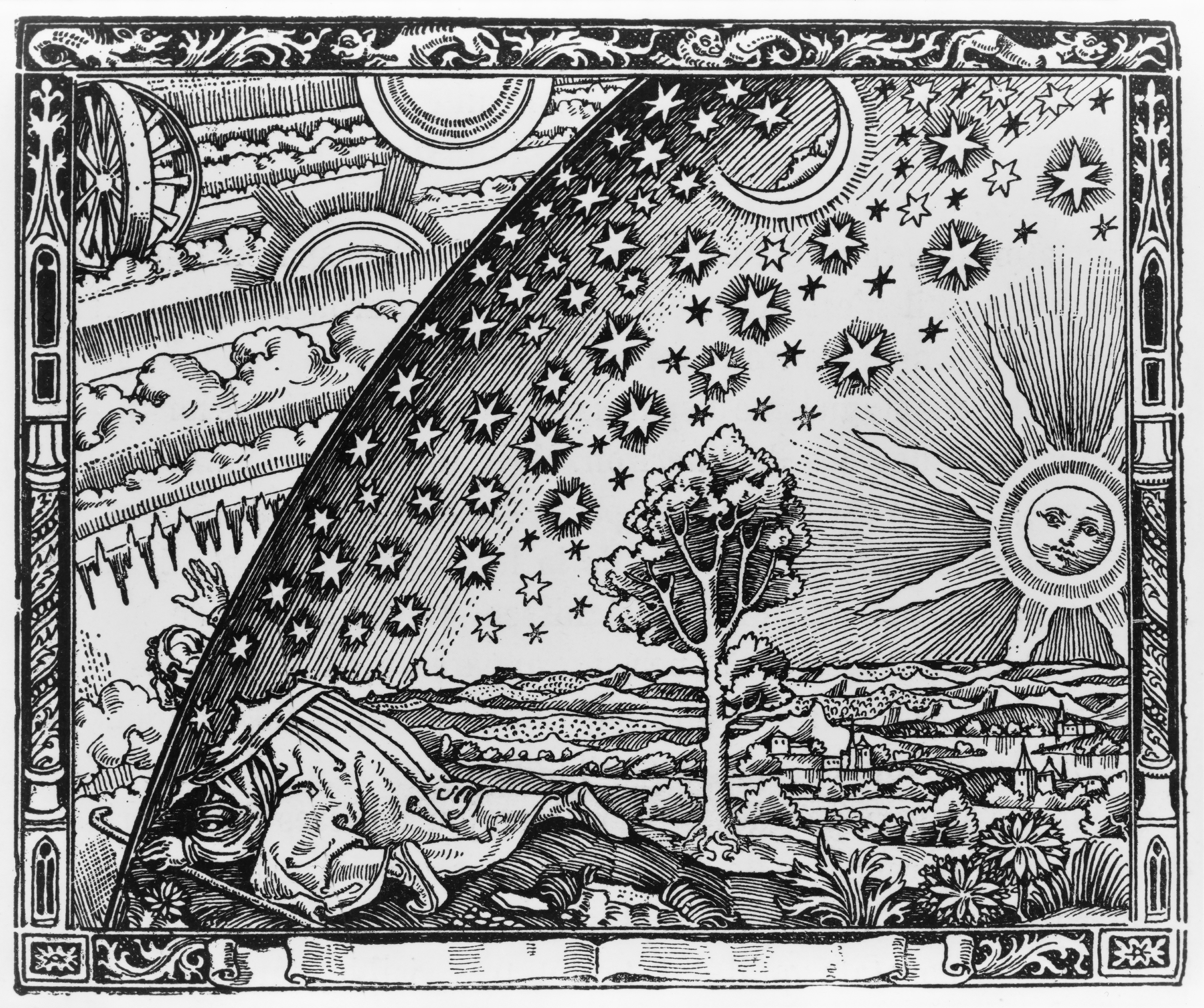
Rabbi Jonah taught not to investigate what was before (illustration from Camille Flammarion's 1888 L'atmosphère: météorologie populaire)

A midrash identified six things preceding creation: the Torah and Throne of Glory, which were created, and the Patriarchs, Israel, Temple, and the Messiah's name, whose creation was contemplated. Rabbi Ahava added repentance. Rabbi Abba bar Kahana held that the Torah preceded the Throne of Glory, citing Proverbs 8:22 and Psalms 93:2. Conversely, Rabbi Huna and Yirmeya, citing Rabbi Samuel bar Isaac, held that the contemplation of Israel came first, since the Torah already refers to the "children of Israel."

A midrash recounts that a heretic asked Rabbi Akiva who created the world. When Akiva answered God, the heretic demanded proof. Akiva asked who made the heretic's garment; he replied that a weaver had, and, challenged for proof, said this was self-evident. Akiva responded that God's creation of the world was equally evident. After the heretic left, Akiva explained to his disciples that just as a house implies a builder, a garment a weaver, and a door a carpenter, so the world attests to its Creator. A baraita relates that Ptolemy placed 72 elders in separate rooms without explaining why, ordering each to translate the Torah into Greek (the Septuagint). God prompted all 72 to render Genesis 1:1 identically: "God created in the beginning" instead of "In the beginning, God created," to prevent interpreting "In the beginning" and "God" as two creators.

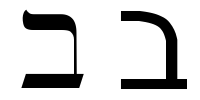
The Hebrew letter bet

Rabbi Jonah, citing Rabbi Levi, taught that the world was created with the letter bet, which begins Genesis 1:1 (בְּרֵאשִׁית, בָּרָא אֱלֹהִים, bereishit bara Elohim, "In the beginning God created"). Just as bet is closed on three sides and open in front, one may not investigate what is above, below, before, or behind creation. Similarly, Bar Kappara interpreted Deuteronomy 4:32 as permitting inquiry from the creation of time onward and across the heavens, but not into what preceded the world. Rabbi Joḥanan and Rabbi Eleazar (or, according to others, Resh Lakish) compared this to a king who built a palace on a garbage dump and afterward forbade mention of the dump, just as the chaos preceding creation should not be discussed. The Mishnah similarly prohibited teaching about Creation to more than one student.

==== Creation of heaven and earth ====
Rav Zutra bar Tobiah, citing Rav, taught that the world was created through ten things: wisdom, understanding, reason, strength, rebuke, might, righteousness, judgment, loving-kindness, and compassion. The Mishnah taught that God created the world through ten utterances, although one would have sufficed, to emphasize its value and the gravity of destroying it. Rabbi Joḥanan connected these utterances to the requirement to read at least ten Torah verses in the synagogue. The Gemara counted nine instances of "And [God] said" in Genesis 1, treating "In the beginning" as the tenth based on Psalm 33:6, which describes creation through God's word. Rav Judah, citing Rav, listed ten things created on the first day: heaven, earth, chaos (תֹהוּ, tohu), void (בֹהוּ, bohu), light, darkness, wind, water, the length of day, and the length of night, deriving them from Genesis 1:1–5.

The House of Shammai held that heaven preceded earth (Genesis 1:1), comparing them to a throne and footstool (Isaiah 66:1). The House of Hillel held that earth came first (Genesis 2:4), likening it to the foundation beneath heaven's upper chambers (Amos 9:6). The Sages maintained that both were created simultaneously (Isaiah 48:13), which the two schools understood to mean only that they were inseparable. Resh Lakish reconciled the verses by distinguishing their creation, beginning with heaven, from their placement, beginning with earth. Similarly, the Elders of the Negev told Alexander the Great that heaven was created first, but declined to answer whether light or darkness came first, fearing further questions about matters beyond the permitted scope of inquiry into Creation.

Rabbi Jose bar Ḥanina interpreted "heaven" (שָּׁמַיִם, shamayim) as "there is water" (sham mayim), while a baraita derived it from "fire and water" (eish u'mayim), which God combined to form the firmament.

==== Light and darkness ====
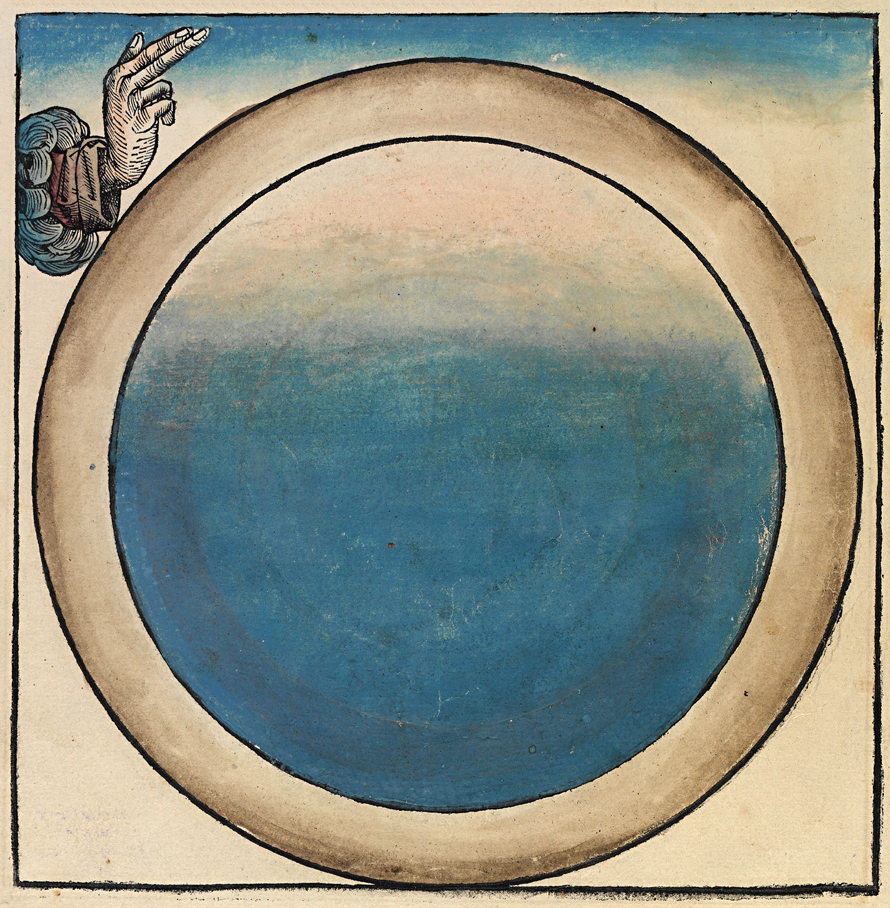
First Day of Creation, Let there be light (illustration from the 1493 Nuremberg Chronicle)

A teaching cited in the Gemara described tohu as a green line encircling the world from which darkness emerges, and bohu as stones submerged in the depths from which water flows. Addressing the apparent discrepancy between light's creation on the first day (Genesis 1:3) and the heavenly lights' placement on the fourth (Genesis 1:16–19), Rabbi Eleazar taught that the original light allowed one to see from one end of the world to the other. God concealed it from the wicked generations of the Flood and Dispersion, reserving it for the righteous in the world to come (Job 38:15; Genesis 1:4). Rabbi Jacob agreed, while the Sages held that the heavenly lights were created on the first day but placed in the firmament on the fourth.

Rabbi Yannai interpreted the light, day, and morning of Genesis 1:2–5 as symbolizing the righteous, and darkness, night, and evening as the wicked. He understood "one day" as Yom Kippur, given to the righteous. Similarly, Rabbi Judah bar Simon associated light and morning with Jacob, darkness and evening with Esau, and "one day" with Israel's Day of Atonement, when darkness has no influence.

Interpreting Genesis 1:5, the Gemara considered whether or (אוֹר, "light") meant daytime or daybreak, but concluded that God assigned light to the day and darkness to the night.

==== Separation of waters ====
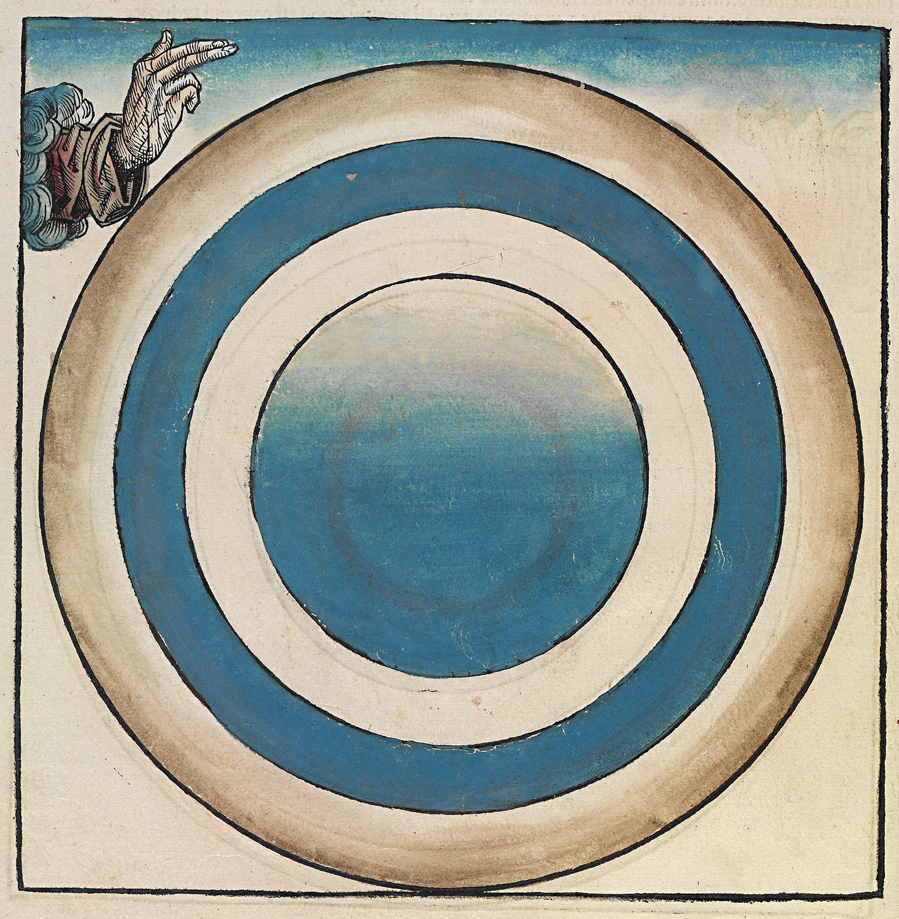
Second Day of Creation, God separated the waters below from the waters above (Nuremberg Chronicle, 1493)

Ben Zoma taught that only three fingerbreadths separated the upper and lower waters, comparing God's spirit hovering over the waters (Genesis 1:2) to a dove hovering over its young. Rabbi Joshua said that Ben Zoma had not understood; the Gemara noted that the hovering occurred on the first day, before the waters were divided on the second. Other sages compared the gap to a hair's breadth, the space between bridge planks, overlapping cloaks, or nested cups.

Rabbi Judah ben Pazi connected "firmament" (רָקִיעַ, rakiya) in Genesis 1:6 with "flattened" (וַיְרַקְּעוּ, vayraku) in Exodus 39:3, teaching that God spread the heavens like cloth. Rabbi Judah ben Simon instead interpreted the passage as the making of a lining for the firmament.

A baraita taught that the upper waters remain suspended by God's command and produce rain, agreeing with Rabbi Joshua, while Rabbi Eliezer offered a different interpretation of Psalm 104:13.

==== Gathering of waters ====
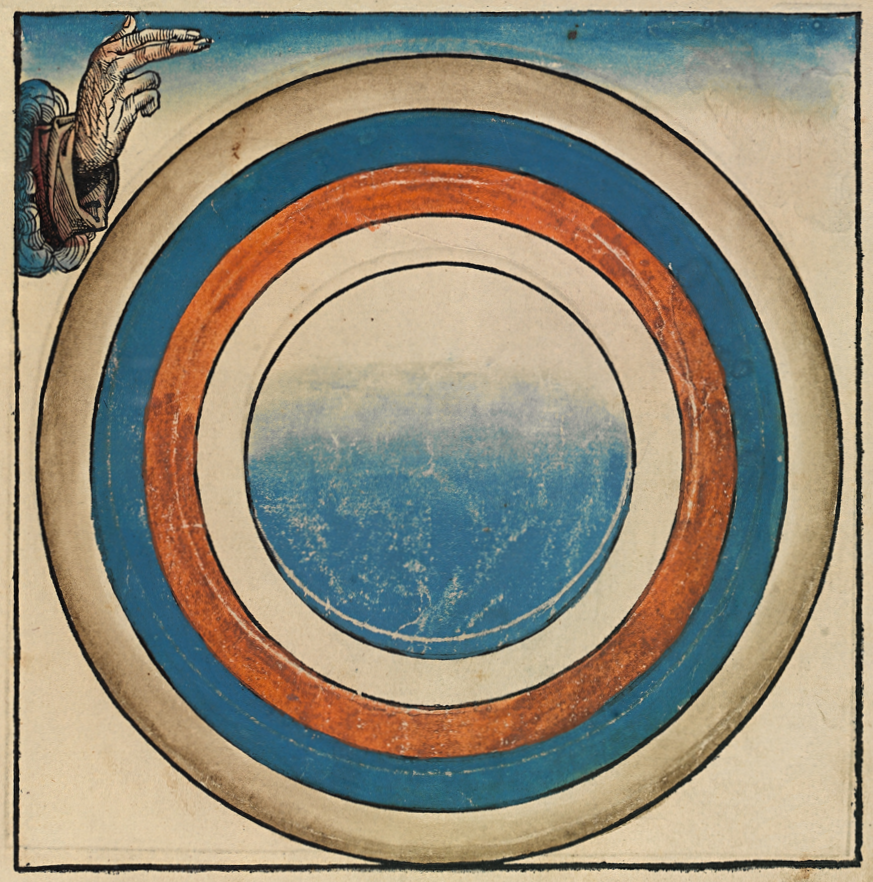
Third Day of Creation, God gathered the waters to reveal the earth underneath (Nuremberg Chronicle, 1493)

Rav Judah taught that the world expanded like unraveling thread until God rebuked it into stillness (Job 26:11). Similarly, Resh Lakish interpreted God's name El Shaddai (אֵל שַׁדַּי) as "He who said to the world, 'Enough!'" (dai, דַּי), and taught that God likewise rebuked the expanding sea and dried it up (Nahum 1:4).

Rabbi Eliezer taught that the gathering of waters in Genesis 1:9 foreshadowed the splitting of the sea during the Exodus from Egypt, when twelve paths opened for the tribes, divided by walls of water through which the Israelites could see one another and God's presence (Psalm 77:19).

==== Intercalation ====
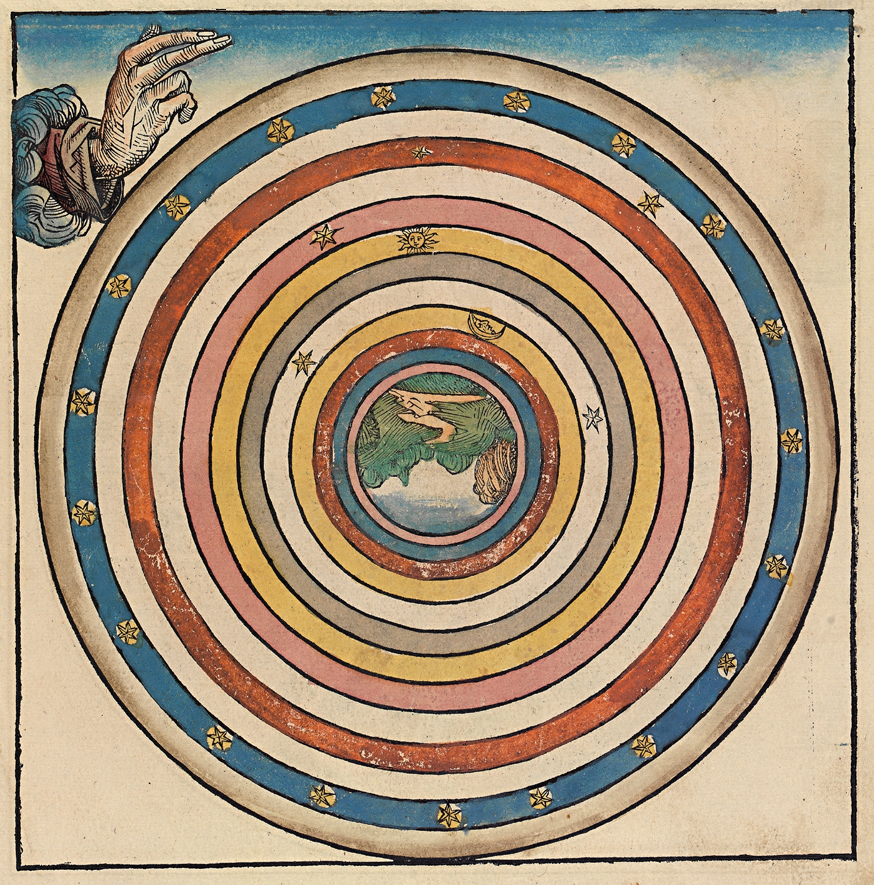
Fourth Day of Creation (illustration from the 1493 Nuremberg Chronicle)

The Pirke De-Rabbi Eliezer taught that God created the sun and moon on 28 Elul (Genesis 1:16) and established the calculations of the Hebrew calendar, including intercalation. God entrusted these calculations to Adam in the Garden of Eden (Genesis 5:1), who passed them through Enoch, Noah, Shem, Abraham, Isaac, Jacob, and Joseph and his brothers. After their deaths, the Israelites ceased intercalating years until God revealed the calendar's principles to Moses and Aaron (Exodus 12:1–2), granting them authority to intercalate. The midrash also linked the future of intercalation to Elijah's coming and the Messianic Age.

==== Sea monsters ====
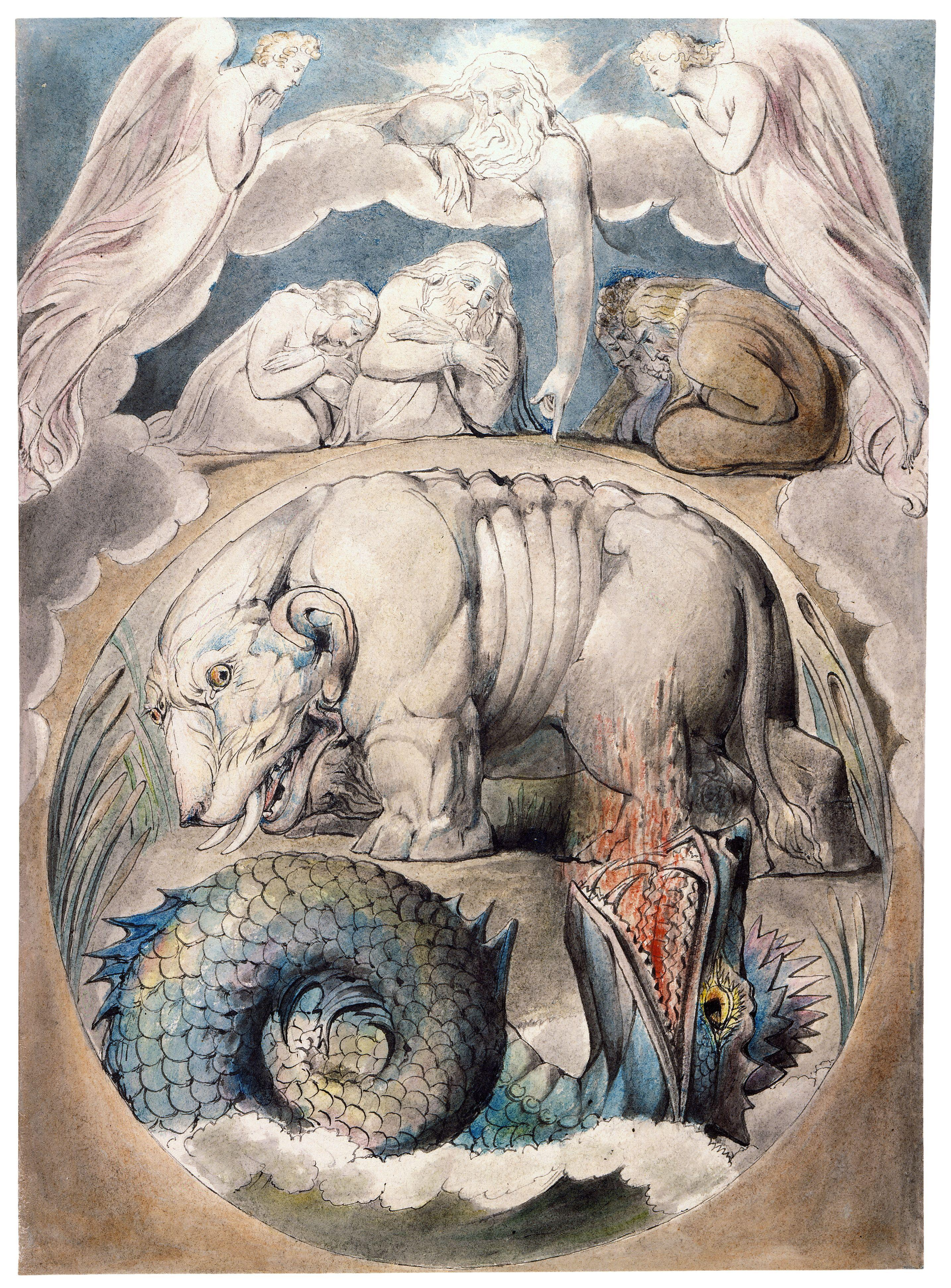
Behemoth and Leviathan (watercolor by William Blake from his 1805 set of Illustrations of the Book of Job)

Rabbi Joḥanan identified the "great sea-monsters" of Genesis 1:21 as Leviathan the slant serpent and Leviathan the tortuous serpent (Isaiah 27:1). Rav Judah, citing Rav, taught that God created living things male and female, including Leviathan and Behemoth (Psalm 50:10), but prevented these creatures from mating lest they destroy the world. God castrated both males, killed and salted the female Leviathan for the righteous in the world to come, and cooled and preserved the female Behemoth for them. Rav Judah also taught that at Creation, God ordered the angel of the sea to swallow all the world's waters. When it refused, God killed it (Job 26:12). Rabbi Isaac identified the angel as Rahab, whose stench would have been unbearable had the waters not covered it.

==== Humanity ====
Rabbi Joḥanan interpreted "Let us make man" (Genesis 1:26) as God consulting the heavenly court of angels, thereby modeling humility. When heretics cited the plural wording as evidence of multiple creators, Rabbi Simlai pointed to the singular "God created" in Genesis 1:27. He further explained that God initially created Adam from dust and Eve from Adam, whereas subsequent human creation involves both man and woman and the Shechinah. Similarly, a baraita relates that when Ptolemy commissioned 72 elders to translate the Torah separately, God prompted them all to render Genesis 1:26 as "I shall make man in image and likeness" to avoid implying multiple creators.

Rabbi Akiva taught that humans are beloved for being created in God's image, and especially for being told so. According to the Pirke De-Rabbi Eliezer, God consulted the Torah before creating humanity. The Torah warned that humans would be short-lived, prone to anger and sin, and better left uncreated without divine forbearance. God invoked the attributes "slow to anger" and "abounding in love" before proceeding.

Rabbi Eleazar interpreted Deuteronomy 4:32 to mean that Adam originally extended from earth to heaven, while Rav Judah, citing Rav, understood him to span the world from end to end. Both taught that God diminished Adam after his sin, and the Gemara reconciled their views by equating the two distances.

A baraita recounts that the House of Shammai argued humanity would have been better off not created, while the House of Hillel disagreed. After two and a half years of debate, a vote favored Shammai's position. Since humanity exists, however, people should examine their past deeds or, according to another version, their future actions.

==== Liturgy ====
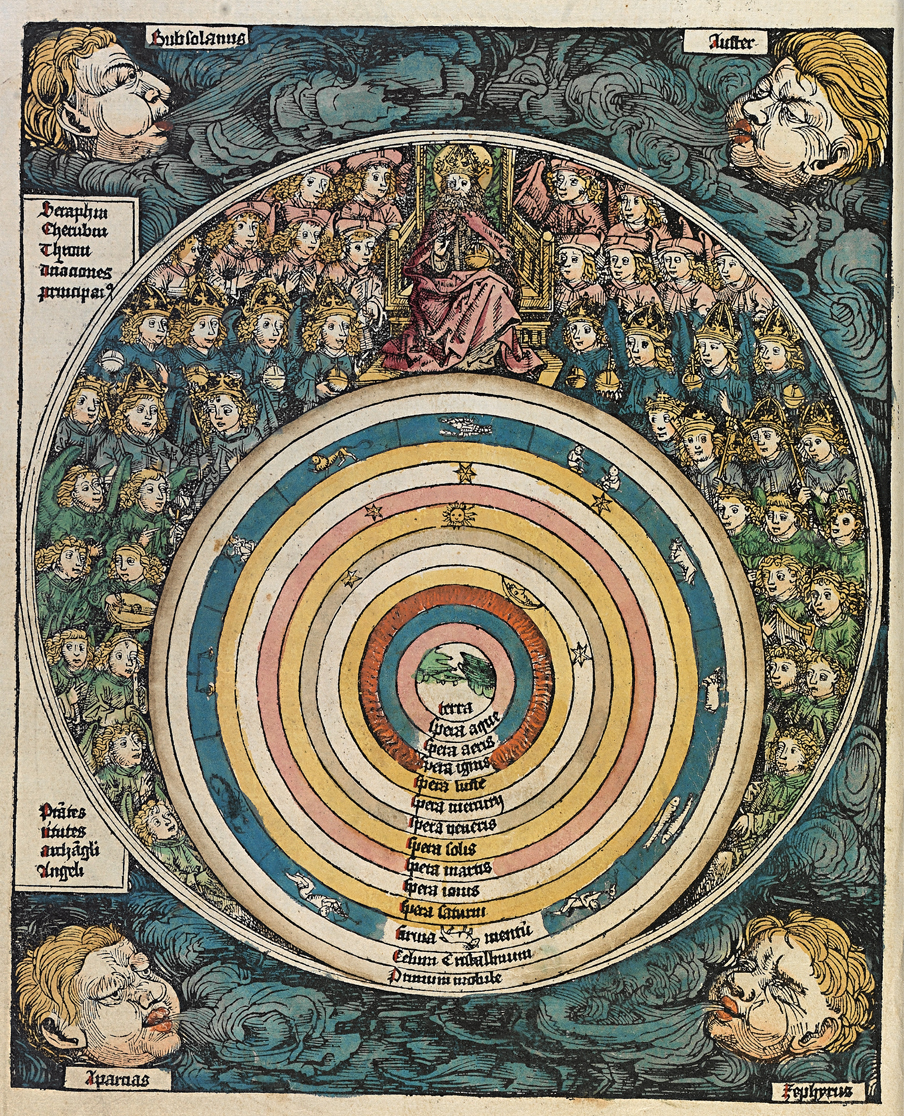
The Seventh Day of Creation (Nuremberg Chronicle, 1493)

The Mishnah describes how, during the Second Temple period, representatives of the people (ma'amadot) accompanied communal sacrifices offered in Jerusalem with four days of fasting and daily readings of the Creation account (Genesis 1:1–2:3), divided from Sunday through Friday. Rabbi Ammi taught that their worship sustained heaven and earth, interpreting Jeremiah 33:25 as linking the world's stability to the observance of God's covenant. He also taught that when Abraham asked how his descendants would inherit the Land despite their sins, God prescribed sacrifices and promised that, in the absence of the Temple, reading the Torah's sacrificial passages would count as offerings and bring forgiveness.

==== Human temperament ====
According to Rabbi Joshua ben Levi's notebook, birth on each day of the week corresponds to an aspect of Creation and predicts a person's character. Sunday signifies someone lacking either goodness or wickedness—thus entirely wicked or righteous—because God created light and darkness (Genesis 1:3–5); Monday, someone quarrelsome, reflecting the division of waters (Genesis 1:6–7); Tuesday, someone wealthy and promiscuous, reflecting the growth of vegetation (Genesis 1:11); Wednesday, someone bright, corresponding to the luminaries (Genesis 1:16–17); and Thursday, someone charitable, reflecting the fish and birds sustained by divine kindness (Genesis 1:21). Those born on Friday would be seekers, which Rav Naḥman bar Isaac interpreted as seekers of mitzvot, since Friday is devoted to Sabbath preparations. Those born on the Sabbath would die on the Sabbath because their birth required its desecration; Rava, son of Rav Shila, added that they would be regarded as great and holy.

==== Finished heaven and earth ====
Rava (or, according to others, Rabbi Joshua ben Levi) taught that Sabbath-eve prayers must include Genesis 2:1–3, beginning "And the heaven and the earth were finished" (וַיְכֻלּוּ הַשָּׁמַיִם וְהָאָרֶץ, va-yachulu hashamayim v'haaretz). Rav Hamnuna taught that reciting these verses makes one a partner with God in Creation, interpreting va-yachulu ("and they were finished") as va-yekallu ("and they finished"). Rav Ḥisda, citing Mar Ukva, added that two ministering angels then place their hands on the worshipper's head and proclaim forgiveness of sins (Isaiah 6:7).

Rabbi Simeon noted that Scripture generally names heaven before earth, but Genesis 2:4 reverses the order, indicating that earth and heaven are equal.

==== Sabbath as completion of the world ====
A baraita taught that when King Ptolemy brought together 72 elders, placed them in 72 separate rooms without telling them why, and directed each of them to translate the Torah, God prompted each one of them and they all conceived the same idea and wrote for Genesis 2:2, "And he finished on the sixth day, and rested on the seventh day" (instead of "and He finished on the seventh day," to prevent readers from reading that God worked on the Sabbath).

Similarly, Rabbi asked Rabbi Ishmael the son of Rabbi Jose if he had learned from his father the actual meaning of Genesis 2:2, "And on the seventh day God finished the work that He had been doing" (for surely God finished God's work on the sixth day, not the Sabbath). He compared it to a man striking a hammer on an anvil, raising it by day and bringing it down immediately after nightfall. (In the second between raising the hammer and bringing it down, night began. Thus, he taught that God finished God's work right at the end of the sixth day, in that very moment the Sabbath began.)

Rabbi Simeon bar Yoḥai taught that mortal humans, who do not know exactly what time it is, must add from the profane to the sacred to avoid working in the sacred time; but God knows time precisely and can enter the Sabbath by a hair's breadth. Genibah and the Rabbis discussed Genesis 2:2–3. Genibah compared it to a king who made a bridal chamber, which he plastered, painted, and adorned, so that all that the bridal chamber lacked was a bride to enter it. Similarly, just then, the world lacked the Sabbath. (Thus, by means of instituting the Sabbath itself, God completed God's work, and humanity's world, on the seventh day.) The Rabbis compared it to a king who made a ring that lacked only a signet. Similarly, the world lacked the Sabbath. And the midrash taught that this is one of the texts that they changed for King Ptolemy (as they could not expect him to understand these explanations), making Genesis 2:2 read, "And He finished on the sixth day, and rested on the seventh." King Ptolemy (or others say, a philosopher) asked the elders in Rome how many days it took God to create the world. The elders replied that it took God six days. As a reply to this answer he questioned if Gehenna has been burning for the wicked since then and exprsssed sadness on the world with hell.

==== Extent of "the work" that god rested ====
Reading the words "His work" in Genesis 2:2–3, Rabbi Berekiah said in the name of Rabbi Judah the son of Rabbi Simon that with neither labor nor toil did God create the world, yet Genesis 2:2 says, "He rested ... from all His work." He explained that Genesis 2:2 states it that way to punish the wicked who destroy the world, which was created with labor, and to give a good reward to the righteous who uphold the world, which was created with toil(thr reading relies on the ambiguous meaning of the hebrew word וַיְכַ֤ל, which means to finish but also reward and punish). Reading the words "Because that in it God rested from all God's work of creation that God had done," in Genesis 2:3, the midrash taught that what was created on the Sabbath, after God rested, was tranquility, ease, peace, and quiet. Rabbi Levi said in the name of Rabbi Jose ben Nehorai that as long as the hands of their Master were working on them, they went on expanding; but when the hands of their Master rested, rest was afforded to them, and thus God gave rest to the world on the seventh day. Rabbi Abba taught that when a mortal king takes his army to their quarters, he does not distribute largesse (rather, he does that only before the troops go into battle), and when he distributes largesse, he does not order a halt. But God ordered a halt and distributed largesse, as Genesis 2:2–3 says, "And He rested ... and He blessed." (Not only did God afford humanity a day of rest, but God also gave humanity the gift of a sacred day.)

==== Observance of Sabbath (even by God) ====
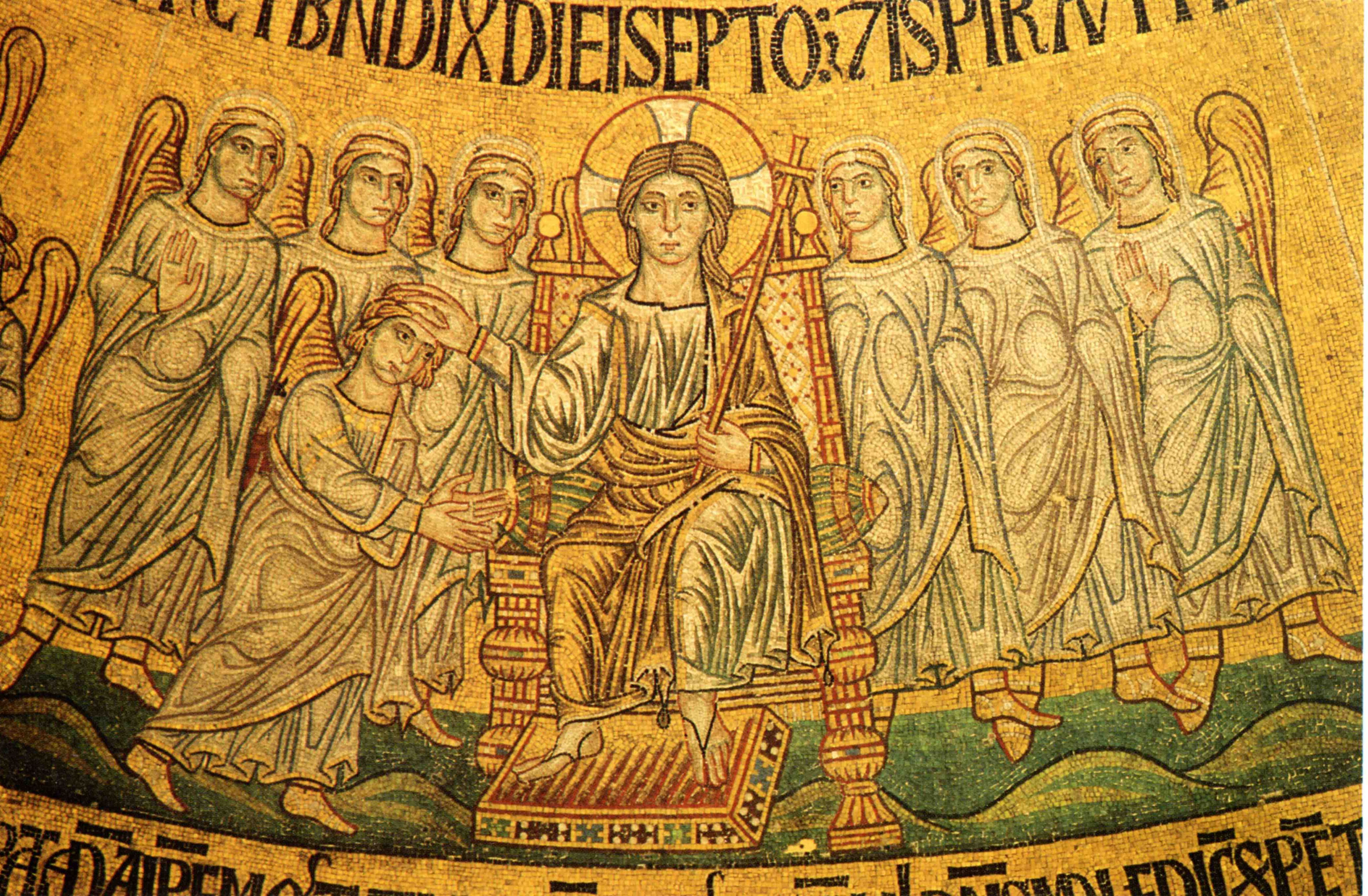
The Blessing of the Seventh Day (13th-century mosaic in St Mark's Basilica)

Reading Genesis 2:2, "And on the seventh day God finished the work," the Pirke De-Rabbi Eliezer taught that God created seven dedications (for the creation of each of the seven days). God expressed six of them and reserved one for future generations. Thus, when God created the first day and finished all God's work on it, God dedicated it, as Genesis 1:5 says, "And it was evening, and it was morning, one day." When God created the second day and finished all God's work in it, God dedicated it, as Genesis 1:8 says, "And it was evening, and it was morning, a second day." Similar language appears through the six days of creation. God created the seventh day, but not for work, because Genesis does not say in connection the seventh day, "And it was evening, and it was morning." That is because God reserved the dedication of the seventh day for the generations to come, as Zechariah 14:7 says, speaking of the Sabbath, "And there shall be one day which is known to the Lord; not day, and not night." The Pirke De-Rabbi Eliezer compared this to a man who had precious utensils that he wanted to leave as an inheritance to his son. The Pirke De-Rabbi Eliezer taught that likewise, God wanted to give the day of blessing and holiness that was before God as an inheritance to Israel. For when the Israelites left Egypt, before God gave them the Torah, God gave them the Sabbath as an inheritance (as reported in Exodus 16:23). Before God gave Israel the Torah, they kept two Sabbaths, as Nehemiah 9:14 says first, "And You made known to them Your holy Sabbath." And only afterwards did God give them the Torah, as Nehemiah 9:14 says as it continues, "And commanded them commandments, and statutes, and Torah by the hand of Moses, Your servant." God observed and sanctified the Sabbath, and Israel is obliged only to observe and sanctify the Sabbath. For when God gave the Israelites manna, all through the 40 years in the wilderness, God gave it during the six days in which God had created the world, Sunday through Friday, but on the Sabbath, God did not give them manna. Of course, God had power enough to give them manna every day. But the Sabbath was before God, so God gave the Israelites bread for two days on Friday, as Exodus 16:29 says, "See, for the Lord has given you the Sabbath, therefore he gives you on the sixth day the bread of two days." When the people saw that God observed the Sabbath, they also rested, as Exodus 16:30 says, "So the people rested on the seventh day."

==== Multiplied days ====
Reading Genesis 2:3, "And God blessed the seventh day, and hallowed it," the Pirke De-Rabbi Eliezer taught that God blessed and hallowed the Sabbath day, and Israel is bound only to keep and to hallow the Sabbath day. Hence the Sages said that those who says the benediction and sanctification over the wine on Friday evenings will have their days increased in this world, and in the world to come. For Proverbs 9:11 says, "For by me your days shall be multiplied," signifying in this world. And Proverbs 9:11 continues, "and the years of your life shall be increased" signifying in the world to come.

==== Tabernacle comparisons ====
Rav Haviva of Hozna'ah told Rav Assi (or, according to others, Rav Assi himself said) that the Tabernacle was erected on 1 Nisan. A Tanna attributed ten "crowns" to that date for ten notable firsts, including the first day of Creation. Another baraita compared the Israelites' dedication of the Tabernacle to Creation, teaching that both occasions brought God equal joy. It linked Leviticus 9:1, "And it came to pass (וַיְהִי, va-yehi) on the eighth day," with Genesis 1:5, "And there was (וַיְהִי, va-yehi) one day."

=== Medieval rabbinic interpretation ===
According to the Zohar, the "Tree bearing fruit with its seed in it" in Genesis 1:12 signifies the "Light" of God mentioned in Genesis 1:3, which early in creation impregnated the Rose of the Shechinah.

Baḥya ibn Paquda noted that Genesis 1:27, "So God created man in God's own image, in the image of God, God created man," and Genesis 6:8, "in the eyes of God," imply that God has physical form and body parts, and Genesis 6:5–6, "And the Lord saw ... and the Lord regretted," implies that God takes bodily actions like human beings. Baḥya explained that necessity brought people to anthropomorphize God and describe God in terms of human attributes so that human listeners could grasp God in their minds. After doing so, people can learn that such description was only metaphorical, and that the truth is too sublime, too exalted, and too remote from the ability and powers of human minds to grasp. Baḥya advised wise thinkers to endeavor to remove the husk of the terms and their corporeality and ascend in their minds to reach the true intended meaning according to the ability of their minds to grasp. Baḥya cautioned that one must be careful not to take descriptions of God's attributes literally or in a physical sense. Rather, one must know that they are metaphors, geared to what we can grasp with our powers of understanding because of our urgent need to know God. But God is infinitely greater and loftier than all these attributes.

The Alphabet of Sirach recounted the tale of the first woman, created in Genesis 1, called Lilith, who fought with Adam over who would be on top, and then fled the Garden.

=== Modern interpretation ===
Moshe Chaim Luzzatto (the RaMCHaL) posited that God's purpose in creation was to give a gift from God's good to another being. Since God is perfect, it would have been insufficient for God to give merely a partial good. Rather, God would have to give the ultimate good that God's creation—humankind—could receive. As God is the true good, that ultimate good is found in God. Allowing God's creatures to become more attached to God would thus allow them to experience this ultimate receivable good. Thus, the purpose of creation was to bring into existence a creature who could derive pleasure from God's own good. God further recognized that for humanity to most enjoy this good, humanity would have to feel that humanity had earned it. God therefore arranged that humanity be able to perceive right and wrong and have access to both. God thus gave humanity the means to earn the attachment to God that God sought to give.

Walter Brueggemann saw a chiastic structure in the separate days of creation in Genesis 1:3–25, meant to show the good order of the created world under God’s serene rule:

A: Time: "There was evening and morning ..."

B: Command: "God said, 'Let there be ...'"

C: Execution: "And it was so."

B^{1}: Assessment: "God saw that it was good."

A^{1}: Time: "There was evening and morning ..."

John Goldingay noted these repeated elements in the days of creation: (1) God spoke a command; (2) the command was fulfilled; (3) the text notes "it was so"; (4) God looked and declared it good; (5) God named the thing; and (6) the day ended. And Goldingay noted these variations: day 1 has no "it was so"; day 2 has no declaration of goodness; day 3 has two commands and two fulfillments; day 4 has no naming; day 5 has no "it was so" and no naming; day 6 has three statements by God and the declaration "very good," but no naming; and day 7 has no naming, declaration of goodness, or statement that the day ended.

Moses Mendelssohn alluded to God’s creation of people in God’s image in Genesis 1:26–27 in comparing church and state. Government and religion, Mendelssohn argued, have for their object the promotion, by means of public measures, of human felicity in this life and in the life to come. Both act upon people’s convictions and actions, on principles and their application; the state, by means of reasons based on the relations between people, or between people and nature, and religion by means of reasons based on the relations between people and God. The state treats people as the immortal children of the earth; religion treats people as the image of their Creator.

Gunther Plaut argued that Genesis contains the supposition that all human beings derive from a common ancestor, and thus conceives of humankind as being of one kind, with no race or linguistic group superior to any other.

=== Parallels in inner-biblical interpretation ===
Biblical allusions to a struggle between the Creator God and the sea, sometimes personified as a monster, appear at Psalm 74:12–17, Isaiah 27:1, 51:9-10; and Job 26:13 and 38:8–11.

Genesis 1:29, the first food law, anticipates later food laws in Genesis 9:3–4, Leviticus 11, and Deuteronomy 14:3–21.

==== The Sabbath ====
Genesis 2:1–3 refers to the Sabbath. The Hebrew Bible repeats the commandment to observe the Sabbath 12 times.

Genesis 2:1–3 reports that in the seventh phase of Creation, God finished God’s work, rested, and blessed and hallowed the seventh phase.

The Sabbath is one of the Ten Commandments. In Exodus 20:8–11, God commanded that one remember the Sabbath day, keep it holy, and not work or cause anyone under one's control to work, on the grounds that God had made heaven and earth in six days and rested in the seventh day, blessed the sabbath day, and hallowed it. Deuteronomy 5:12–15 commands that one observe the Sabbath day, keep it holy, and not work or cause anyone under one's control to work—so that one's subordinates might also rest—and remember that the Israelites were servants in the land of Egypt and God brought them out with a mighty hand and by an outstretched arm.

In the incident of the manna in Exodus 16:22–30, Moses told the Israelites that the Sabbath is a solemn rest day; prior to the Sabbath one should cook what one would cook and lay up food for the Sabbath. And God told Moses to let no one go out of one's place on the seventh day.

In Exodus 31:12–17, just before giving Moses the second Tablets of Stone, God commanded that the Israelites keep and observe the Sabbath throughout their generations, as a sign between God and the children of Israel forever, on the grounds that in six days God made heaven and earth, and on the seventh day God rested.

In Exodus 35:1–3, just before issuing the instructions for the Tabernacle, Moses told the Israelites that no one should work on the Sabbath, specifying that one must not kindle fire on the Sabbath.

In Leviticus 23:1–3, God told Moses to repeat the Sabbath commandment to the people, calling the Sabbath a holy convocation.

The prophet Isaiah taught in Isaiah 1:12–13 that iniquity is inconsistent with the Sabbath. In Isaiah 58:13–14, the prophet taught that if people turn away from pursuing or speaking of business on the Sabbath and call the Sabbath a delight, then God will make them ride upon the high places of the earth and will feed them with the heritage of Jacob. And in Isaiah 66:23, the prophet taught that in times to come, from one Sabbath to another, all people will come to worship God.

The prophet Jeremiah taught in Jeremiah 17:19–27 that the fate of Jerusalem depended on whether the people abstained from work on the Sabbath, refraining from carrying burdens outside their houses and through the city gates.

The prophet Ezekiel told in Ezekiel 20:10–22 how God gave the Israelites God's Sabbaths to be a sign between God and them, but the Israelites rebelled against God by profaning the Sabbaths, provoking God to pour out God's fury upon them, but God stayed God's hand.

In Nehemiah 13:15–22, Nehemiah told how he saw some treading winepresses on the Sabbath, and others bringing all manner of burdens into Jerusalem on the Sabbath day, so when it began to be dark before the Sabbath, he commanded that the city gates be shut and not opened till after the Sabbath and directed the Levites to keep the gates to sanctify the Sabbath.

=== Parallels in external sources ===
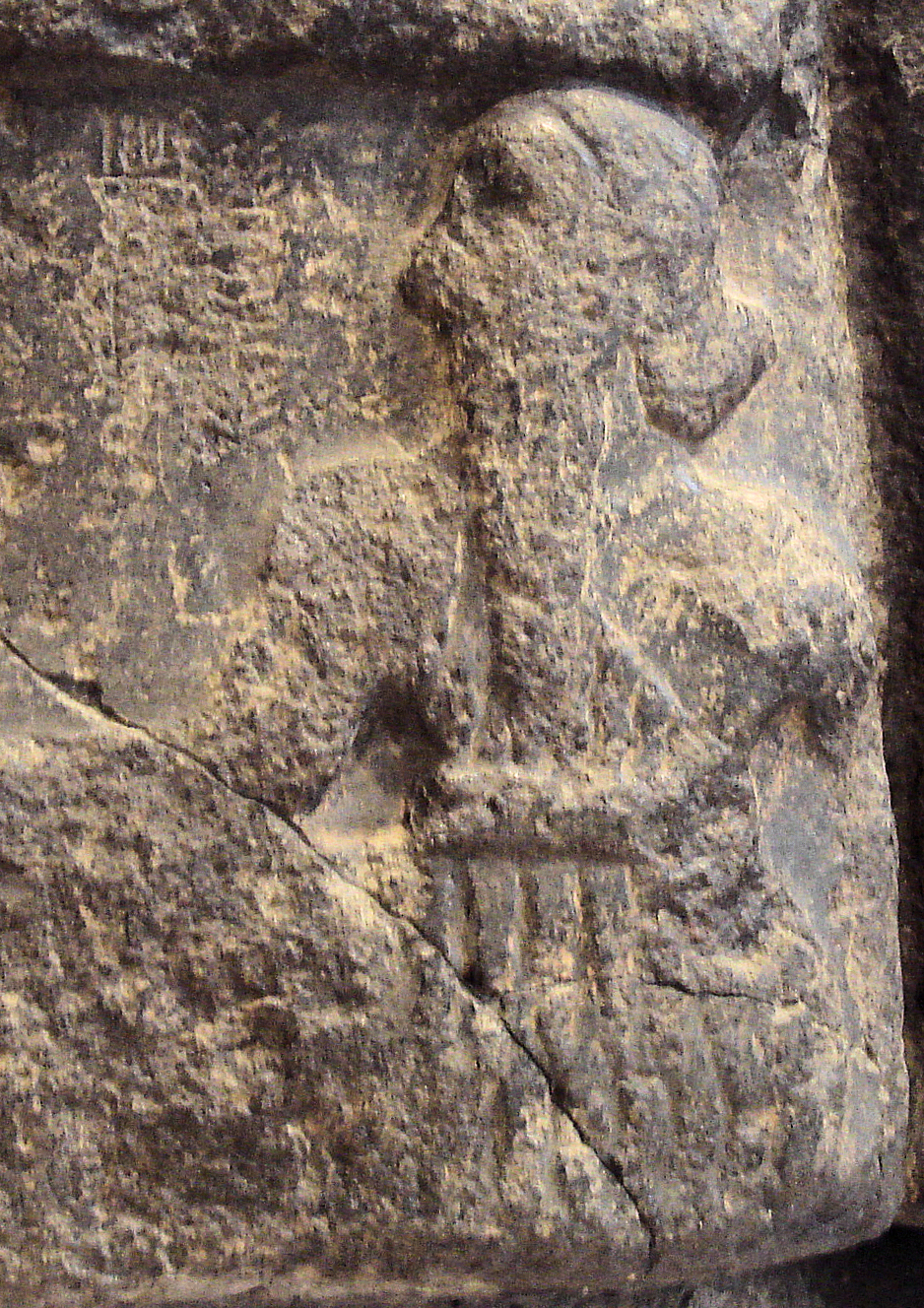
Sargon

==== Early non-rabbinic interpretation ====
One of the first recorded instances of the assertion that God created the world from nothing, ex nihilo, appears in 2 Maccabees 7:28.

==== Ancient sources ====
Noting that Sargon of Akkad was the first to use a seven-day week, Gregory Aldrete speculated that the Israelites may have adopted the idea from the Akkadian Empire.

== Second reading—Genesis 2:4–19 ==
The Garden of Eden (1828 painting by Thomas Cole)

In the second reading, before any shrub or grass had yet sprouted on earth, and before God had sent rain for the earth, a flow would well up from the ground to water the earth. God formed man from the dust, blew the breath of life into his nostrils, and made him a living being. God planted a garden in the east in Eden, caused every good and pleasing tree to grow there, and placed the tree of life and the tree of the knowledge of good and evil in the middle of the garden. A river issued from Eden to water the garden, and then divided into four branches: the Pishon, which winds through Havilah, where there was gold; the Gihon, which winds through Cush; the Tigris, which flows east of Asshur; and the Euphrates. God placed the man in the garden of Eden to till and tend it, and allowed him to eat from every tree of the garden, except for the tree of knowledge of good and evil, warning that if the man ate of it, he would surely die. Saying that it was not good for man to be alone and that God would make for him a fitting helper, God formed all the beasts and birds out of the earth and brought them to the man to name. The second reading ends here.

=== Classical rabbinic interpretation ===
==== Similarity of creation and sabbath mandates ====
A midrash deduced from similarities in the language of the creation of humanity and the Sabbath commandment that God gave Adam the precept of the Sabbath. Reading the report of God’s creating Adam in Genesis 2:15, "And God put him (וַיַּנִּחֵהוּ, vayanihehu) into the Garden of Eden," the midrash taught that "And God put him (וַיַּנִּחֵהוּ, vayanihehu)" means that God gave Adam the precept of the Sabbath, for the Sabbath commandment uses a similar word in Exodus 20:11, "And rested (וַיָּנַח, vayanach) on the seventh day." Genesis 2:15 continues, "to till it (לְעָבְדָהּ, le'avedah)," and the Sabbath commandment uses a similar word in Exodus 20:9, "Six days shall you labor (תַּעֲבֹד, ta’avod)." And Genesis 2:15 continues, "And to keep it (וּלְשָׁמְרָהּ, ule-shamerah)," and the Sabbath commandment uses a similar word in Deuteronomy 5:12, "Keep (שָׁמוֹר, shamor) the Sabbath day."

==== Creation of man as one ====
The Mishnah taught that God created humanity from one person in Genesis 2:7 to teach that Providence considers one who destroys a single person as one who has destroyed an entire world, and Providence considers one who saves a single person as one who has saved an entire world. And God created humanity from one person for the sake of peace, so that none can say that their ancestry is greater than another's. And God created humanity from one person so that heretics cannot say that there are many gods who created several human souls. And God created humanity from one person to demonstrate God's greatness, for people stamp out many coins with one coin press and they all look alike, but God stamped each person with the seal of Adam, and not one of them is like another. Therefore, every person is obliged to say, "For my sake the world was created."

Rabbi Meir used to say that the dust of the first man (from which Genesis 2:7 reports God made Adam) was gathered from all parts of the earth, for Psalm 139:16 says of God, "Your eyes did see my unformed substance," and 2 Chronicles 16:9 says, "The eyes of the Lord run to and fro through the whole earth." Similarly, the Pirke De-Rabbi Eliezer told that when God began to create the first person, God began to collect dust from the four corners of the world—red, black, white, and yellow. Explaining why God gathered the first person's dust from the four corners of the world, God said that if a person should travel from the east to the west, or from the west to the east, and the time should come for the person to depart from the world, then the earth would not be able to tell the person that the dust of the person's body was not of the earth there, and that the person needed to return to the place from which the person had been created. Thus, in every place where a person comes or goes, should the person approach the time to die, in that place is the dust of the person's body, and there the person's body will return to the dust, as Genesis 3:19 says, "For dust you are, and to dust shall you return."

A midrash recounted that Rabbi Jeremiah ben Leazar taught that when God created Adam, God created him a hermaphrodite—two bodies, male and female, joined together—for Genesis 5:2 says, "male and female created He them ... and called their name Adam." Rabbi Samuel bar Naḥman taught that when God created Adam, God created Adam double-faced, then God split Adam and made Adam of two backs, one back on this side and one back on the other side. An objection was raised that Genesis 2:21 says, "And He took one of his ribs" (implying that God created Eve separately from Adam). Rabbi Samuel bar Naḥman replied that the word read as "rib"—מִצַּלְעֹתָיו, mi-zalotav—actually means one of Adam's sides, just as one reads in Exodus 26:20, "And for the second side (צֶלַע, zela) of the tabernacle."

==== Adam, duality in one body ====
The Gemara taught that all agree that there was only one formation of humankind (not a separate creation of man and woman). Rav Judah, however, noted an apparent contradiction: Genesis 1:27 says, "And God created man in [God's] own image" (in the singular), while Genesis 5:2 says, "Male and female created He them" (in the plural). Rav Judah reconciled the apparent contradiction by concluding that in the beginning God intended to create two human beings, and in the end, God created only one human being.

Rav Naḥman bar Rav Ḥisda expounded on the words, "Then the Lord God formed (וַיִּיצֶר, wa-yitzer) man," in Genesis 2:7. Rav Naḥman bar Rav Ḥisda taught that the word וַיִּיצֶר, wa-yitzer is written with two yuds (יי) to show that God created people with two inclinations (yetzerim), one good and one evil. Rav Naḥman bar Isaac demurred, arguing that according to this logic, animals, of which Genesis 2:19 writes וַיִּצֶר, wa-yitzer with a single yud, should have no evil inclination (yetzer hara), but we see that they injure, bite, and kick, plainly evincing an evil inclination. Rather, Rabbi Simeon ben Pazzi explained the two yuds by saying, "Woe is me because of my Creator (yotzri), woe is me because of my evil inclination (yitzri)!" Rabbi Simeon ben Pazzi thus indicated that the two yuds indicate the human condition, where God punishes us for giving in to our evil inclination, but our evil inclination tempts us when we try to resist. Alternatively, Rabbi Jeremiah ben Eleazar explained that the two yuds reflect that God created two countenances in the first man, one man and one woman, back to back, as Psalm 139:5 says, "Behind and before have You formed me."

==== The importance of Adam not being alone ====
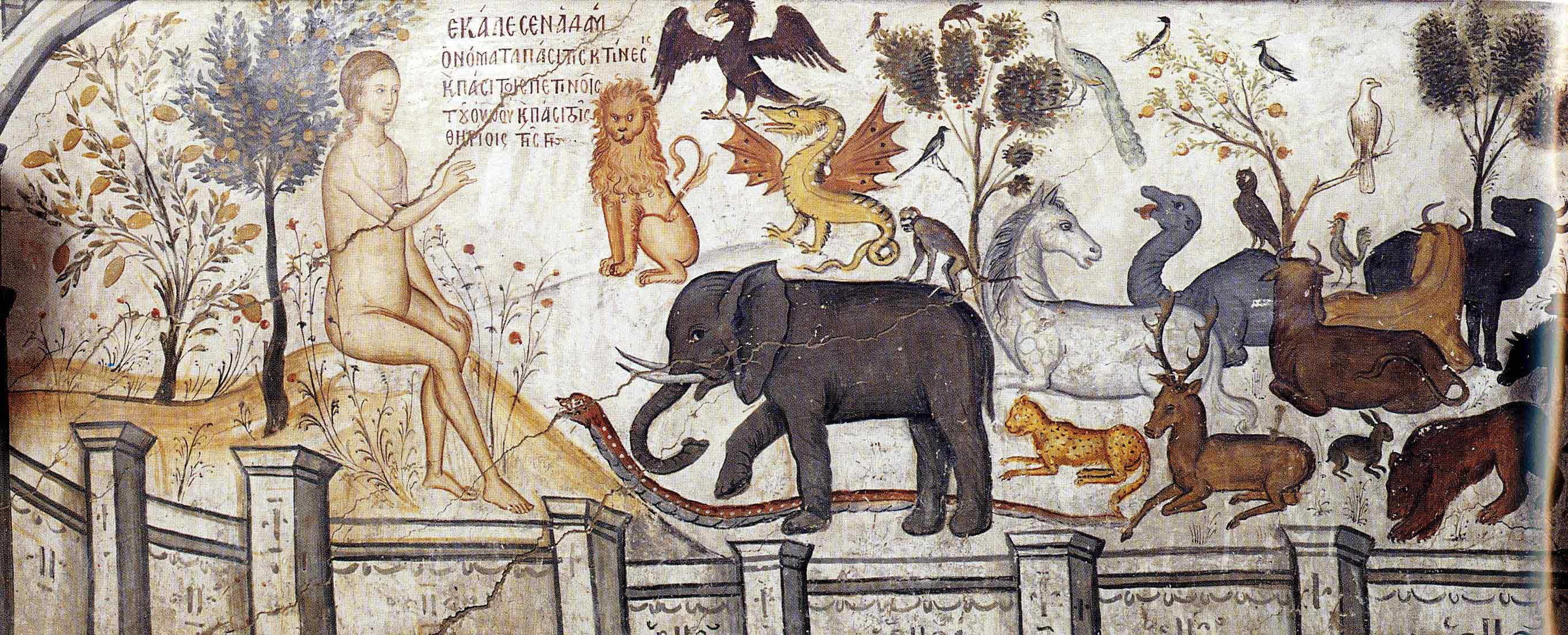
Adam naming the animals, medieval fresco in Monastery of St. Nicholas Anapausas

Reading God's observation in Genesis 2:18 that "it is not good that the man should be alone," a midrash taught that a man without a wife dwells without good, without help, without joy, without blessing, and without atonement. Without good, as Genesis 2:18 says that "it is not good that the man should be alone." Without help, as in Genesis 2:18, God says, "I will make him a help meet for him." Without joy, as Deuteronomy 14:26 says, "And you shall rejoice, you and your household" (implying that one can rejoice only when there is a "household" with whom to rejoice). Without a blessing, as Ezekiel 44:30 can be read, "To cause a blessing to rest on you for the sake of your house" (that is, for the sake of one's wife). Without atonement, as Leviticus 16:11 says, "And he shall make atonement for himself, and for his house" (implying that one can make complete atonement only with a household). Rabbi Simeon said in the name of Rabbi Joshua ben Levi, without peace too, as 1 Samuel 25:6 says, "And peace be to your house." Rabbi Joshua of Siknin said in the name of Rabbi Levi, without life too, as Ecclesiastes 9:9 says, "Enjoy life with the wife whom you love." Rabbi Hiyya ben Gomdi said, also incomplete, as Genesis 5:2 says, "male and female created He them, and blessed them, and called their name Adam," that is, "man" (and thus only together are they "man"). Some say a man without a wife even impairs the Divine likeness, as Genesis 9:6 says, "For in the image of God made God man," and immediately thereafter Genesis 9:7 says, "And you, be fruitful, and multiply (implying that the former is impaired if one does not fulfill the latter).

=== Modern interpretation ===
Martin Buber wrote that Simcha Bunim of Peshischa taught that everyone should carry two pieces of paper, one in each pocket. On one should be written, "For my sake was the world created," while on the other should be written (echoing Genesis 2:7), "I am only earth and ashes." And one should look at one piece of paper or the other as the moment requires.

=== Inner-biblical interpretation ===
Ezekiel 28:12–16 also tells a Garden of Eden story, which like Genesis 2:11–12; 3:1–24, involves precious stones, transgression, cherubs, and exile. And Ezekiel 47:6–9, 12 echoes Genesis 2:8–9, using images of the idyllic Garden of Eden to foretell idyllic future times.

=== Early non-rabbinic interpretation ===
The Septuagint translated the word for "generations" or "story" (תוֹלְדוֹת, toledot) in Genesis 2:4 and 5:1 as "origin," "source," or "creation" (γένεσις, genesis).

The Book of Jubilees interpreted God's warning to Adam in Genesis 2:17 that "on the day that you eat of it you shall die" in the light of the words of Psalm 90:4 that "a thousand years in [God's] sight are but as yesterday," noting that Adam died 70 years short of the 1000 years that would constitute one day in the testimony of the heavens. And the Books of 4 Ezra (or 2 Esdras) and 2 Baruch interpreted Genesis 2:17 to teach that because Adam transgressed God's commandment, God decreed death to Adam and his descendants for all time.

== Third reading—Genesis 2:20–3:21 ==
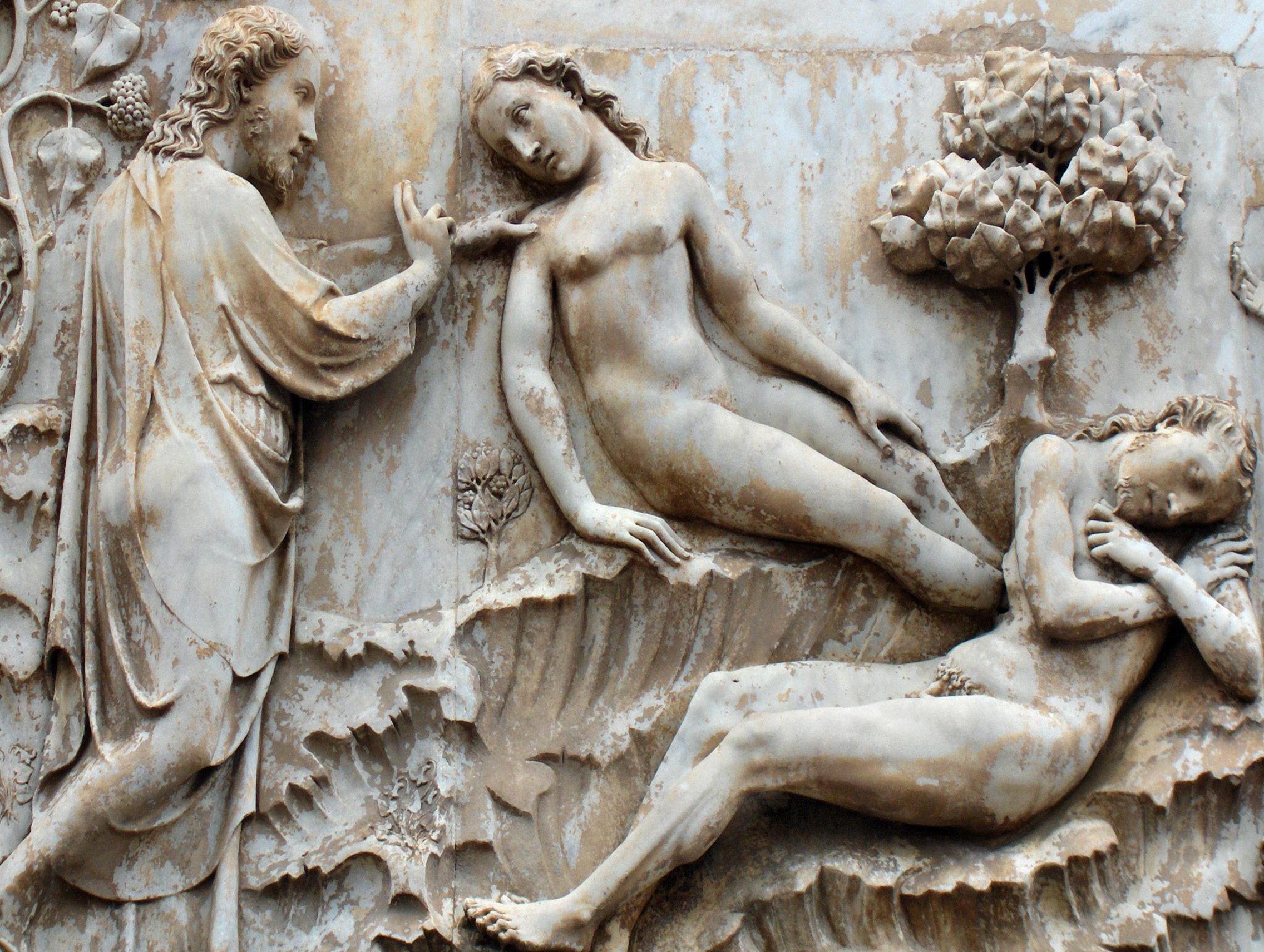
Creation of Eve (early 14th-century marble bas-relief by Lorenzo Maitani on the Orvieto Cathedral)

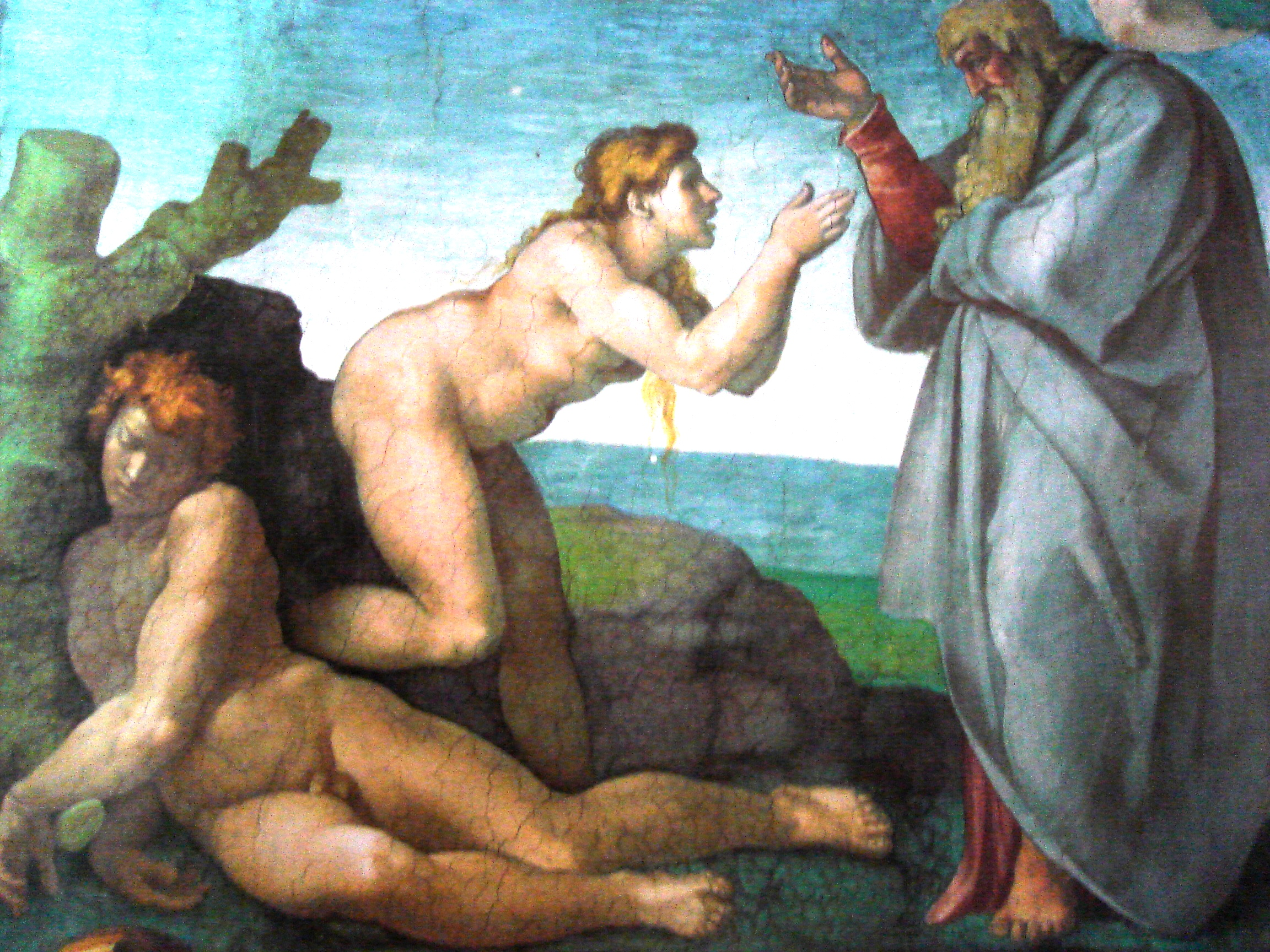
The Creation of Eve (fresco circa 1509–1510 by Michelangelo in the Sistine Chapel)

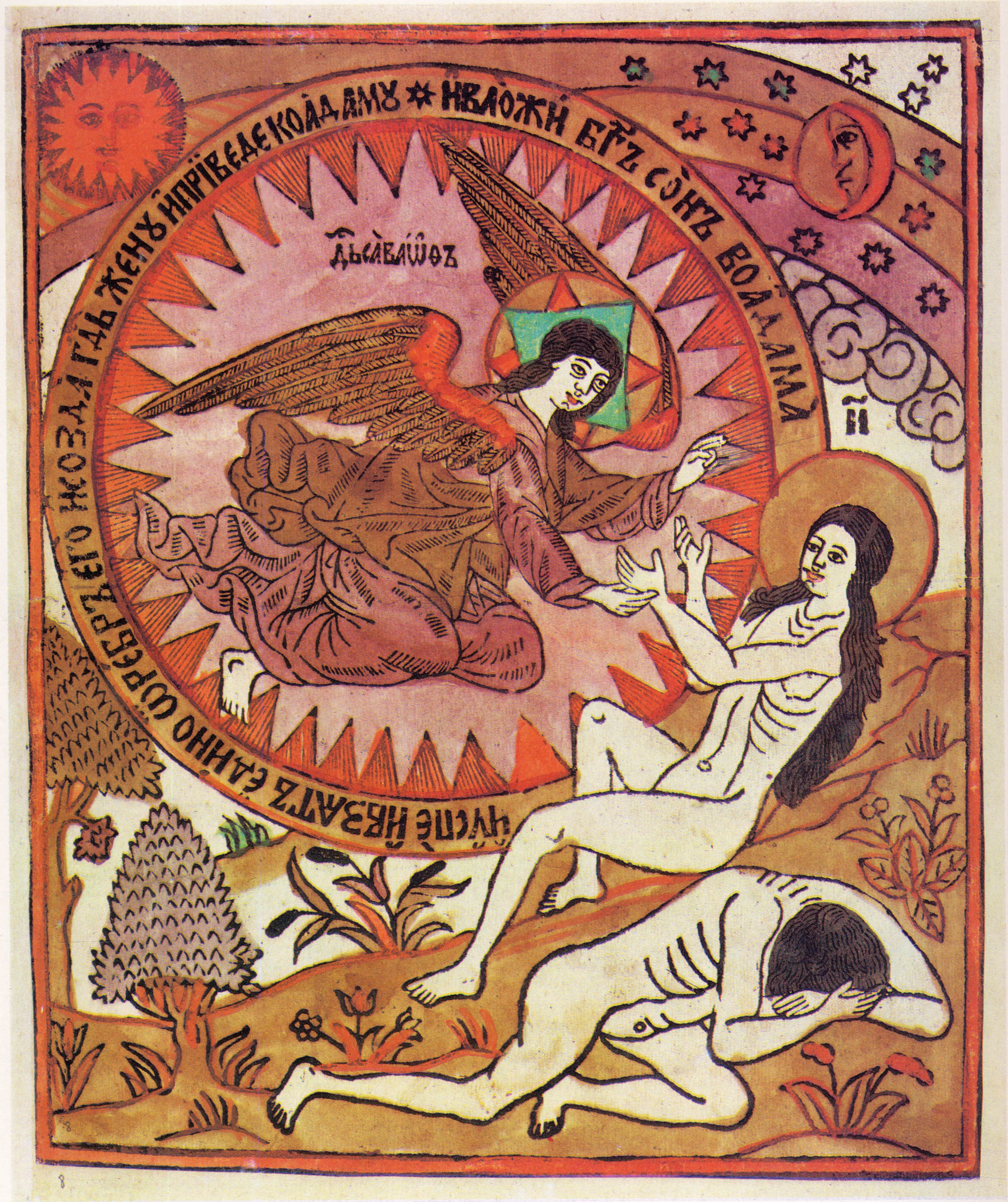
The Creation of Eve (1792 Russian Lubok woodcut)

In the third reading, the man Adam named all the animals, but found no fitting helper. So God cast a deep sleep upon the man and took one of his sides and fashioned it into a woman and brought her to the man. The man declared her bone of his bones and flesh of his flesh and called her woman. Thus a man leaves his parents and clings to his wife, so that they become one flesh.

The man and the woman were naked, but felt no shame. The serpent, the shrewdest of the beasts, asked the woman whether God had really forbidden her to eat any of the fruit in the garden. The woman replied that they could eat any fruit other than that of the tree in the middle of the garden, which God had warned them neither to eat nor to touch, on pain of death. The serpent told the woman that she would not die, but that as soon as she ate the fruit, her eyes would be opened and she would be like divine beings who knew good and evil. When the woman saw that the tree was good for food, pleasing in appearance, and desirable as a source of wisdom, she ate some of its fruit and gave some to her husband to eat. Then their eyes were opened and they saw that they were naked, and they sewed themselves loincloths out of fig leaves.

Hearing God move in the garden, they hid in the trees. God asked the man where he was. The man replied that he grew afraid when he heard God, and he hid because he was naked. God asked him who told him that he was naked and whether he had eaten the forbidden fruit. The man replied that the woman whom God put at his side gave him the fruit, and he ate. When God asked the woman what she had done, she replied that the serpent duped her, and she ate. God cursed the serpent to crawl on its belly, to eat dirt, and to live in enmity with the woman and her offspring. A closed portion ends here.

God then cursed the woman to bear children in pain, to desire her husband, and to be ruled by him. A closed portion ends here.

God then cursed Adam to toil to earn his food from the ground, which would sprout thorns and thistles, until he returned to the ground from which he was taken. Adam named his wife Eve, because she was the mother to all. And God made skin garments to clothe Adam and Eve. The third reading and the eighth open portion end here.

=== Classical rabbinic interpretation ===
The parashah is discussed in these rabbinic sources from the era of the Mishnah and the Talmud:

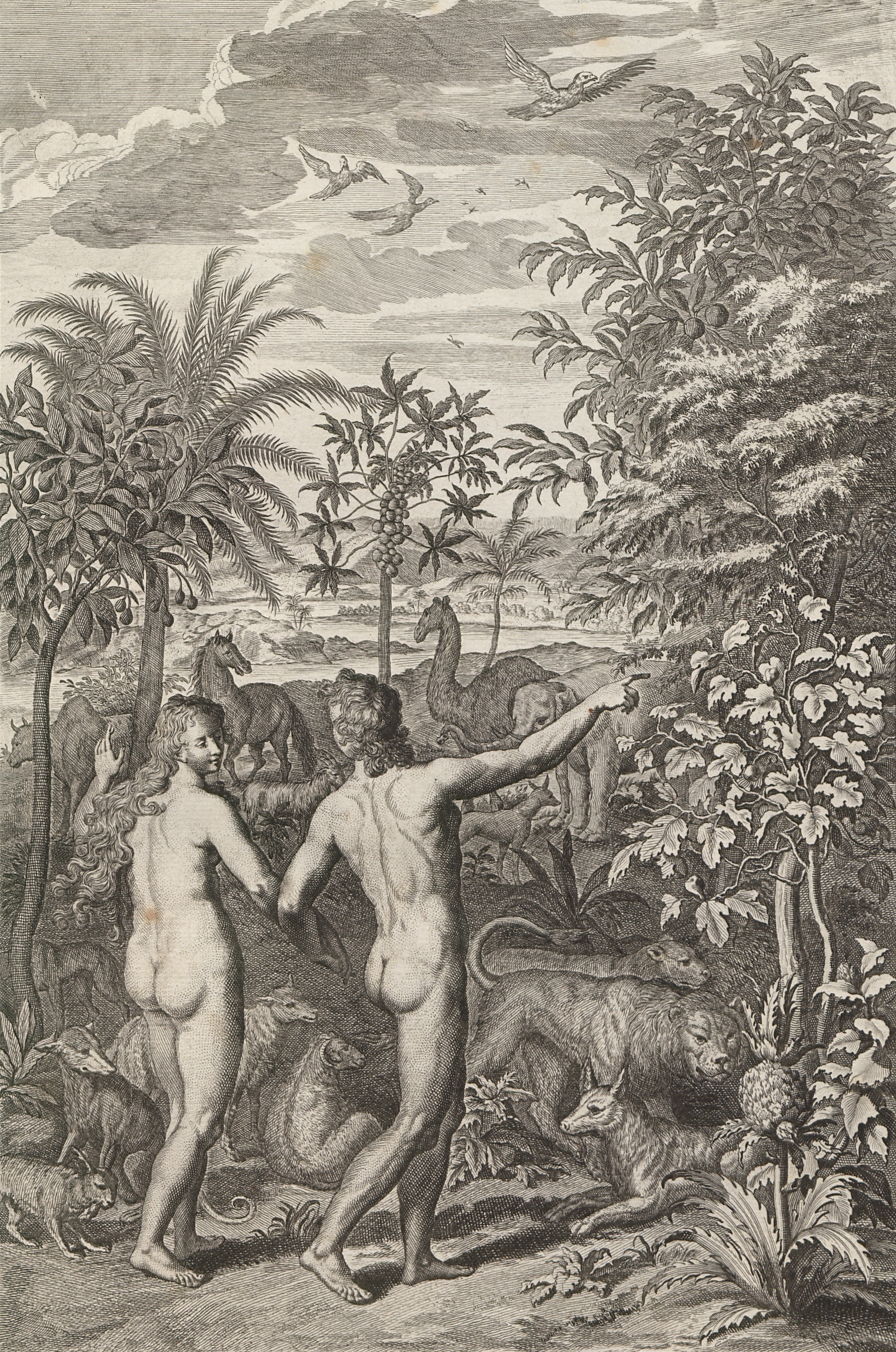
Adam and Eve were both naked and were not ashamed (illustration from the 1728 Figures de la Bible)

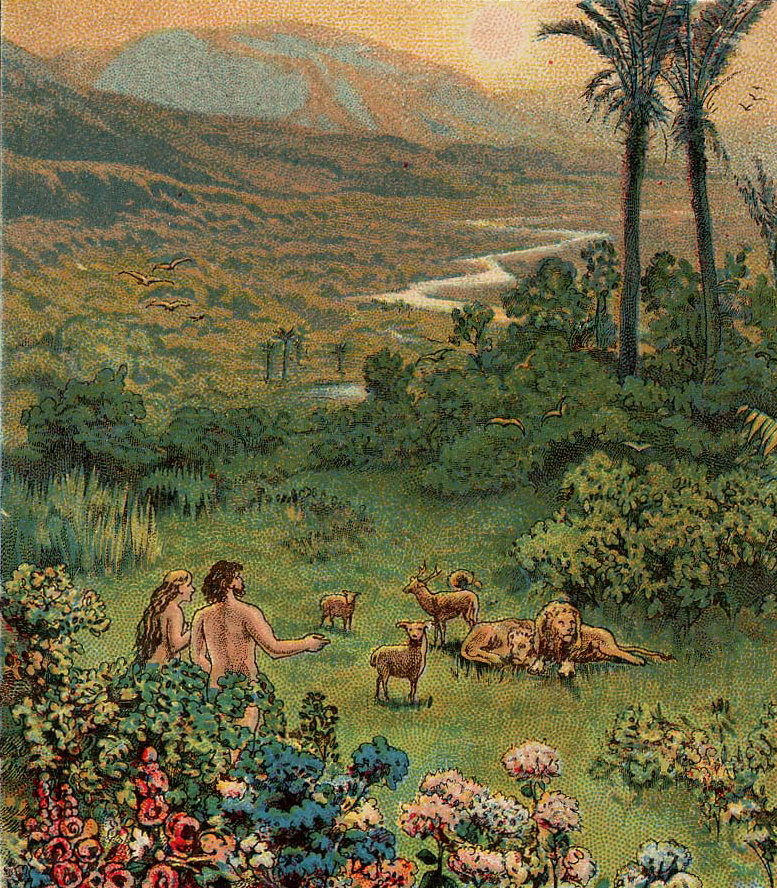
The Garden of Eden (illustration from Bible card published 1906 by the Providence Lithograph Company)

==== The material that was used to create eve ====
Rav and Samuel offered different explanations of the words in Genesis 2:22, "And the rib which the Lord God had taken from man made He a woman." One said that this "rib" was a face, the other that it was a tail. In support of the one who said it was a face, Psalm 139:5 says, "Behind and before have You formed me." The one who said it was a tail explained the words, "Behind and before have You formed me," as Rabbi Ammi said, that humankind was "behind," that is, later, in the work of creation, and "before" in punishment. The Gemara conceded that humankind was last in the work of creation, for God created humankind on the eve of the Sabbath. But if when saying that humankind was first for punishment, one means the punishment in connection with the serpent, Rabbi taught that, in conferring honor the Bible commences with the greatest, in cursing with the least important. Thus, in cursing, God began with the least, cursing first the serpent, then the people. The punishment of the Flood must therefore be meant, as Genesis 7:23 says, "And He blotted out every living substance which was upon the face of the ground, both man and cattle," starting with the people. In support of the one who said that Eve was created from a face, in Genesis 2:7, the word וַיִּיצֶר, wa-yitzer is written with two yuds. But the one who said Eve was created from a tail explained the word וַיִּיצֶר, wa-yitzer as Rabbi Simeon ben Pazzi said, "Woe is me because of my Creator (yotzri), woe is me because of my evil inclination (yitzri)!" In support of the one who said that Eve was created from a face, Genesis 5:2 says, "male and female God created them." But the one who said Eve was created from a tail explained the words, "male and female created He them," as Rabbi Abbahu explained when he contrasted the words, "male and female created He them," in Genesis 5:2 with the words, "in the image of God made God man," in Genesis 9:6. Rabbi Abbahu reconciled these statements by teaching that at first God intended to create two, but in the end created only one. In support of the one who said that Eve was created from a face, Genesis 2:22 says, "He closed up the place with flesh instead thereof." But the one who said Eve was created from a tail explained the words, "He closed up the place with flesh instead thereof," as Rabbi Jeremiah (or as some say Rav Zebid, or others say Rav Naḥman bar Isaac) said, that these words applied only to the place where God made the cut. In support of the one who said that Eve was created from a tail, Genesis 2:22 says, "God built." But the one who said that Eve was created from a face explained the words "God built" as explained by Rabbi Simeon ben Menasia, who interpreted the words, "and the Lord built the rib," to teach that God braided Eve's hair and brought her to Adam, for in the seacoast towns braiding (keli'ata) is called building (binyata). Alternatively, Rav Ḥisda said (or some say it was taught in a baraita) that the words, "and the Lord built the rib," teach that God built Eve after the fashion of a storehouse, narrow at the top and broad at the bottom to hold the produce safely. So Rav Ḥisda taught that a woman is narrower above and broader below so as better to carry children.

==== The context of God giving eve to adam ====
A baraita taught that if an orphan applied to the community for assistance to marry, the community must rent a house, supply a bed and necessary household furnishings, and put on the wedding, as Deuteronomy 15:8 says, "sufficient for his need, whatever is lacking for him." The Rabbis interpreted the words "sufficient for his need" to refer to the house, "whatever is lacking" to refer to a bed and a table, and "for him (לוֹ, lo)" to refer to a wife, as Genesis 2:18 uses the same term, "for him (לוֹ, lo)," to refer to Adam's wife, whom Genesis 2:18 calls "a helpmate for him."

Rabbi Elazar read the words of Genesis 2:18, "a helpmate for him (כְּנֶגְדּוֹ, kenegdo)" to mean that if one is worthy, his wife helps him; if he is not worthy, she is against him.

According to the Gemara, a Roman emperor told Rabban Gamaliel that the God of Genesis was a thief, as Genesis 2:21 says, "And the Lord God caused a deep sleep to fall upon the man and he slept; and [God] took one of his sides and closed up the place with flesh instead." The emperor's daughter told Rabban Gamliel that she would answer the emperor. She then asked her father for an official to avenge a wrong committed against her, as bandits had come the previous night and taken a silver jug and left a gold jug in its place. The emperor replied that if that were so, he would want bandits like those to come every night. She concluded that it was just as good for Adam that God took his side and gave him the woman in its place.

Rabbi Jeremiah ben Eleazar interpreted the words, "and God brought her to the man," in Genesis 2:22 to teach that God acted as best man to Adam, teaching that a man of eminence should not think it amiss to act as best man for a lesser man.

Interpreting the words "And the man said: ‘This is now bone of my bones, and flesh of my flesh; she shall be called Woman'" in Genesis 2:23, Rabbi Judah ben Rabbi taught that the first time God created a woman for Adam, he saw her full of discharge and blood. So God removed her from Adam and recreated her a second time.

==== Genesis 2 in interpretations of other chapters ====
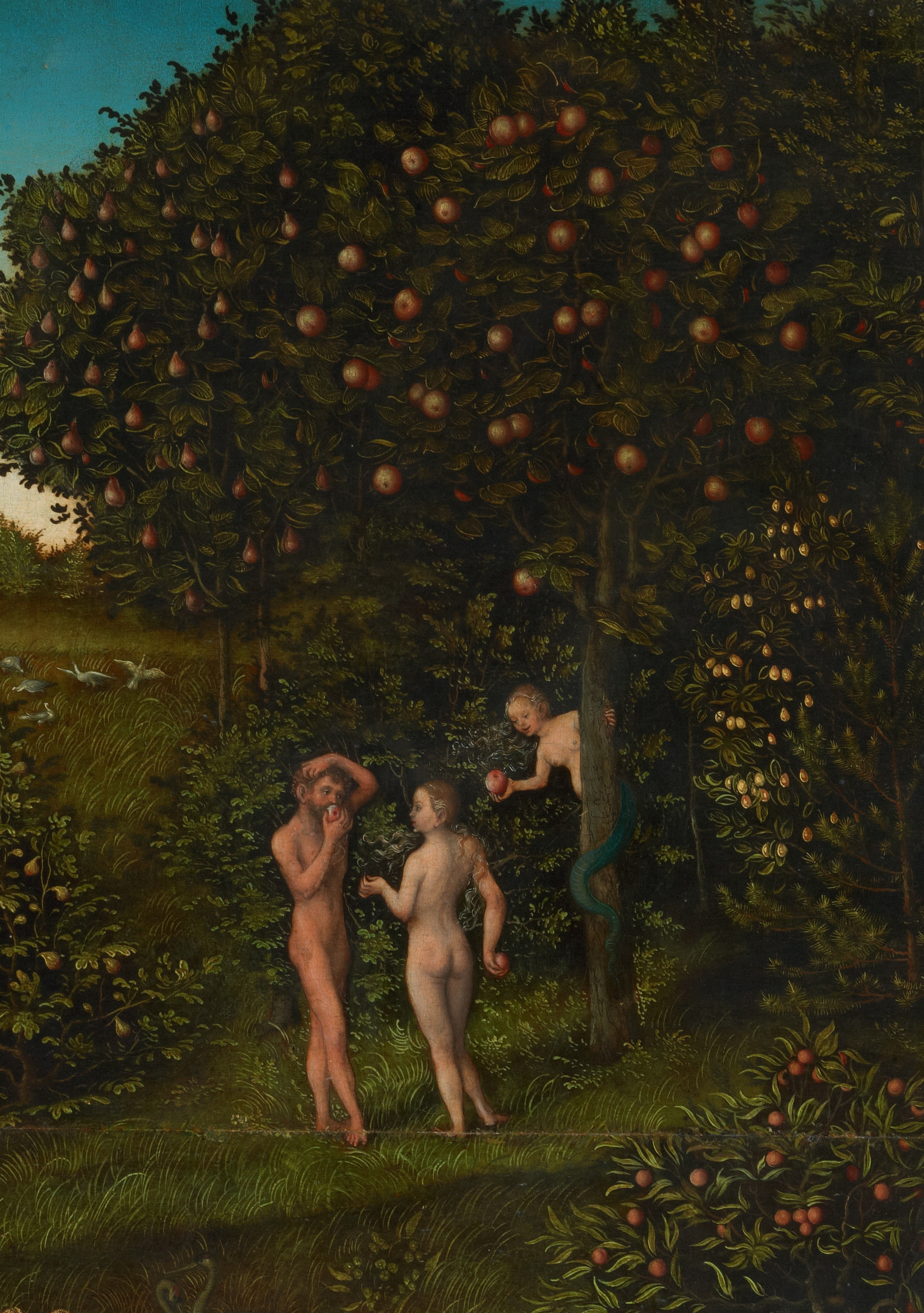
The Fall of Man (16th-century painting by Lucas Cranach the Elder)

The Tosefta taught that the generation of the Flood acted arrogantly before God on account of the good that God lavished on them, in part in Genesis 2:6. So (in the words of Job 21:14–15) "they said to God: 'Depart from us; for we desire not the knowledge of Your ways. What is the Almighty, that we should serve Him? And what profit should we have if we pray unto Him?'" They scoffed that they needed God for only a few drops of rain, and they deluded themselves that they had rivers and wells that were more than enough for them, and as Genesis 2:6 reports, "there rose up a mist from the earth." God noted that they took excess pride based upon the goodness that God lavished on them, so God replied that with that same goodness God would punish them. And thus Genesis 6:17 reports, "And I, behold, I do bring the flood of waters upon the earth."

Rabbi José taught that Isaac observed three years of mourning for his mother Sarah. After three years he married Rebekah and forgot the mourning for his mother. Hence Rabbi José taught that until a man marries a wife, his love centers on his parents. When he marries a wife, he bestows his love upon his wife, as Genesis 2:24 says, "Therefore shall a man leave his father and his mother, and he shall cleave unto his wife."

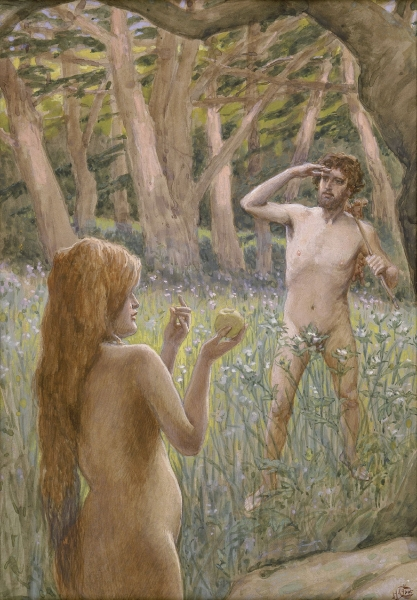
Adam Is Tempted by Eve (watercolor circa 1896–1902 by James Tissot)

==== The tree of good and evil and the serpent ====
Hezekiah noted that in Genesis 3:3, Eve added to God's words by telling the serpent that she was not even permitted to touch the tree. Hezekiah deduced from this that one who adds to God's words in fact subtracts from them.

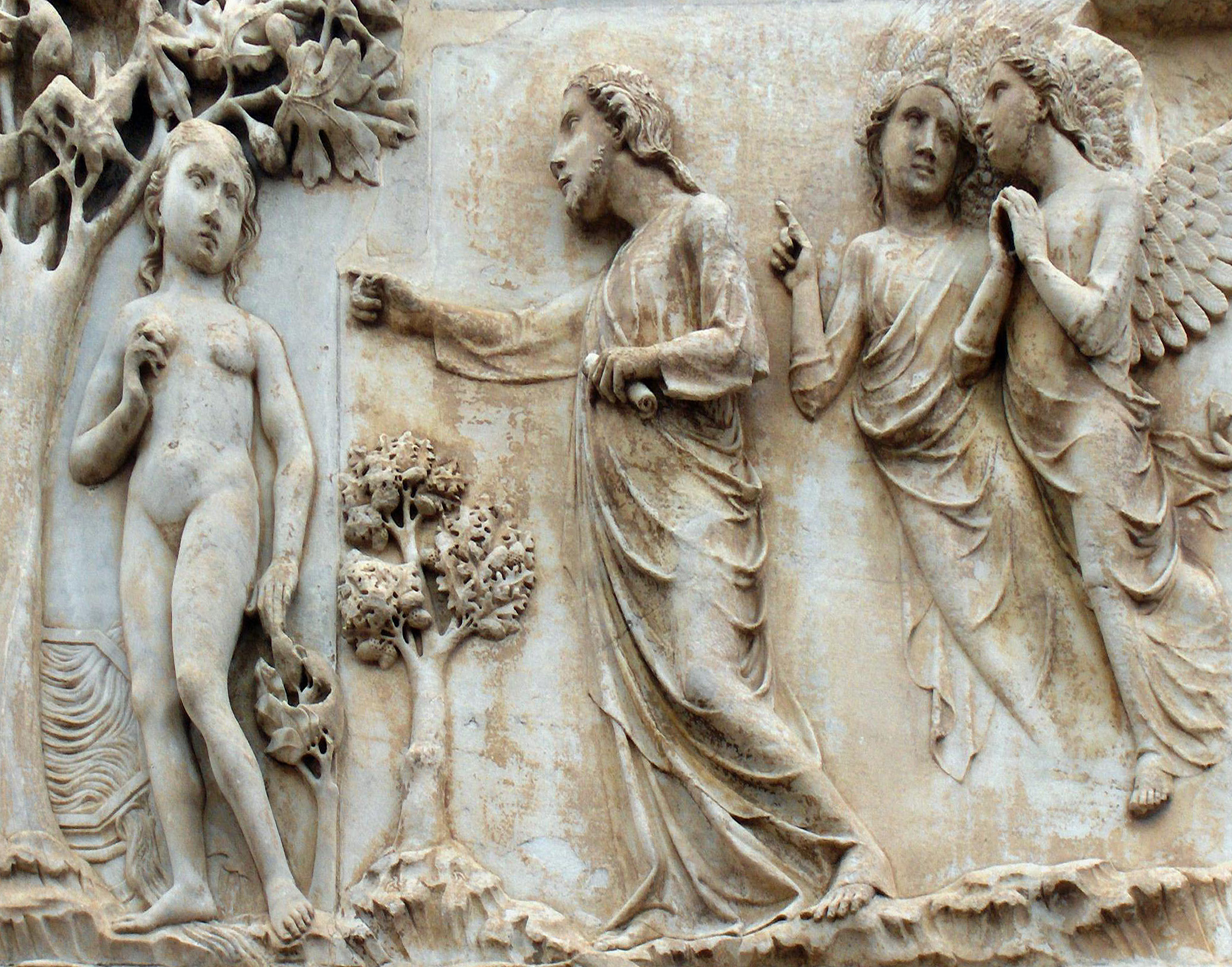
God admonishes Eve regarding the fruit of the tree of knowledge of good and evil (early 14th-century marble bas-relief by Lorenzo Maitani on the Orvieto Cathedral)

A midrash explained that because the serpent was the first to speak slander in Genesis 3:4–5, God punished the Israelites by means of serpents in Numbers 21:6 when they spoke slander. God cursed the serpent, but the Israelites did not learn a lesson from the serpent's fate and nonetheless spoke slander. God therefore sent the serpent, who was the first to introduce slander, to punish those who spoke slander.

Judah ben Padiah noted Adam's frailty, for he could not remain loyal even for a single hour to God's charge that he not eat from the tree of knowledge of good and evil, yet in accordance with Leviticus 19:23, Adam's descendants the Israelites waited three years for the fruits of a tree.

Rabbi Samuel bar Naḥman said in Rabbi Jonathan's name that the story of the serpent in Genesis 3 teaches that one should not plead on behalf of one who instigates idolatry. For Rabbi Simlai taught that the serpent had many pleas that it could have advanced, but it did not do so. And God did not plead on the serpent's behalf, because it offered no plea itself. The Gemara taught that the serpent could have argued that when the words of the teacher and the pupil are contradictory, one should surely obey the teacher's (and so Eve should have obeyed God's command).

==== The curse ====
A baraita reported that Rabbi taught that in conferring an honor, we start with the most important person, while in conferring a curse, we start with the least important. Leviticus 10:12 demonstrates that in conferring an honor, we start with the most important person, for when Moses instructed Aaron, Eleazar, and Ithamar that they should not conduct themselves as mourners, Moses spoke first to Aaron and only thereafter to Aaron's sons Eleazar and Ithamar. And Genesis 3:14–19 demonstrates that in conferring a curse, we start with the least important, for God cursed the serpent first, and only thereafter cursed Eve and then Adam.

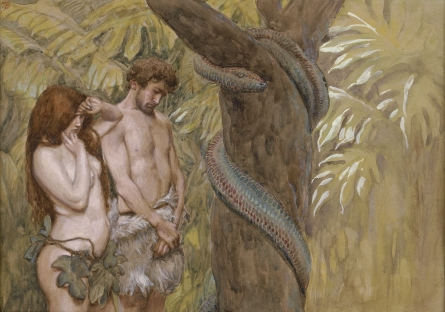
God's Curse (watercolor circa 1896–1902 by James Tissot)

Rabbi Ammi taught that there is no death without sin, as Ezekiel 18:20 says, "The soul that sins ... shall die." The Gemara reported an objection based on the following baraita: The ministering angels asked God why God imposed the death penalty on Adam (in Genesis 3). God answered that God gave Adam an easy command, and he violated it. The angels objected that Moses and Aaron fulfilled the whole Torah, but they died. God replied (in the words of Ecclesiastes 9:2), "There is one event [death] to the righteous and to the wicked; to the good and to the clean and to the unclean; ... as is the good, so is the sinner." The Gemara concluded that the baraita refuted Rabbi Ammi, and there is indeed death without sin and suffering without iniquity.

Rabbi Joshua ben Levi taught that when in Genesis 3:18, God told Adam, "Thorns also and thistles shall it bring forth to you," Adam began to cry and pleaded before God that he not be forced to eat out of the same trough with his donkey. But as soon as God told Adam in Genesis 3:19, "In the sweat of your brow shall you eat bread," Adam's mind was set at ease. Rabbi Simeon ben Lakish taught that humanity is fortunate that we did not remain subject to the first decree. Abaye (or others say Simeon ben Lakish) observed that we are still not altogether removed from the benefits of the first decree, as we eat herbs of the field (which come forth without effort).

==== How one should emulate God ====
Rabbi Ḥama son of Rabbi Ḥanina taught that Genesis 3:21 demonstrates one of God's attributes that humans should emulate. Rabbi Ḥama asked what Deuteronomy 13:5 means in the text, "You shall walk after the Lord your God." How can a human being walk after God, when Deuteronomy 4:24 says, "[T]he Lord your God is a devouring fire"? Rabbi Ḥama explained that the command to walk after God means to walk after the attributes of God. As God clothes the naked—for Genesis 3:21 says, "And the Lord God made for Adam and for his wife coats of skin and clothed them"—so should we also clothe the naked. God visited the sick—for Genesis 18:1 says, "And the Lord appeared to him by the oaks of Mamre" (after Abraham was circumcised in Genesis 17:26)—so should we also visit the sick. God comforted mourners—for Genesis 25:11 says, "And it came to pass after the death of Abraham, that God blessed Isaac his son"—so should we also comfort mourners. God buried the dead—for Deuteronomy 34:6 says, "And He buried him in the valley"—so should we also bury the dead. Similarly, the Sifre on Deuteronomy 11:22 taught that to walk in God's ways means to be (in the words of Exodus 34:6) "merciful and gracious".

=== Modern interpretation ===
Robert A. Oden taught that the Jahwist's creation story in Genesis 2–3 reflects that human beings are dissatisfied by our status as mortals, knowing less than we would like to know. In the Jahwist's Genesis, this dissatisfaction repeatedly gets people into trouble, but the author still, in Oden's reading, finds this human trait admirable, the source of cultural advances. Oden taught that Judaism never read the story as Original Sin or the Fall of Man, but as just one more instance of human beings getting into trouble, and God rescuing them and giving them another chance.

=== Inner-biblical interpretation ===
When Ruth clung (דָּ֥בְקָה, dabkah) to Naomi in Ruth 1:14, the text uses the same verb as Genesis 2:24 uses to state that a man "clings (דָבַ֣ק, dabak) to his wife, so that they become one flesh".

== Fourth reading—Genesis 3:22–4:18 ==
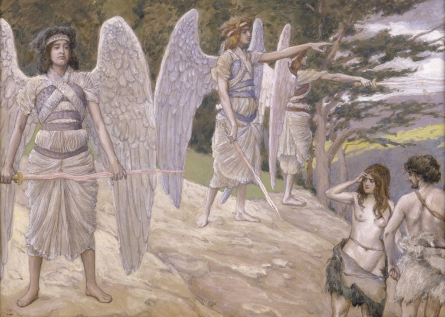
Adam and Eve Driven from Paradise (watercolor circa 1896–1902 by James Tissot)

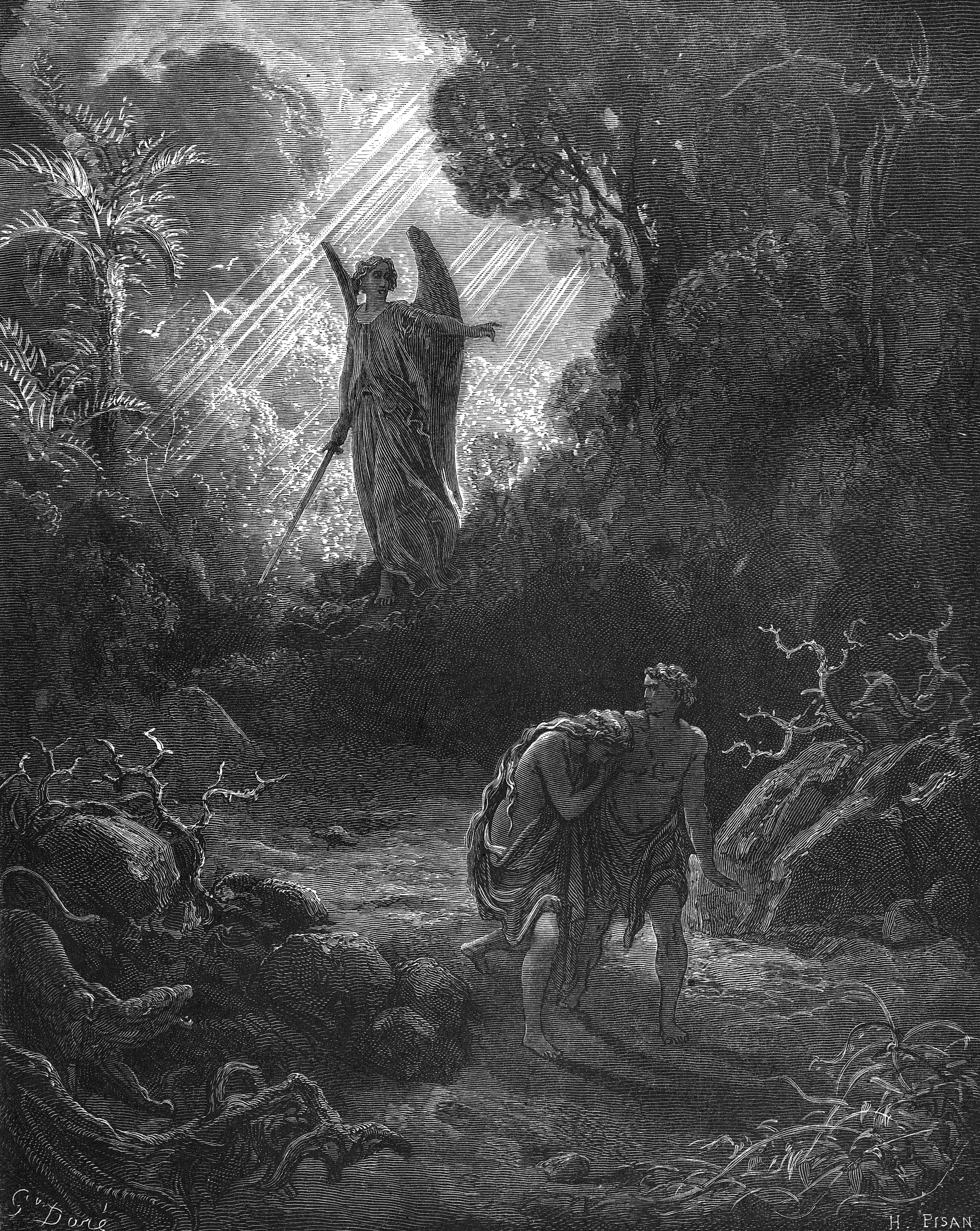
Adam and Eve Driven out of Eden (engraving by Gustave Doré from the 1865 La Sainte Bible)

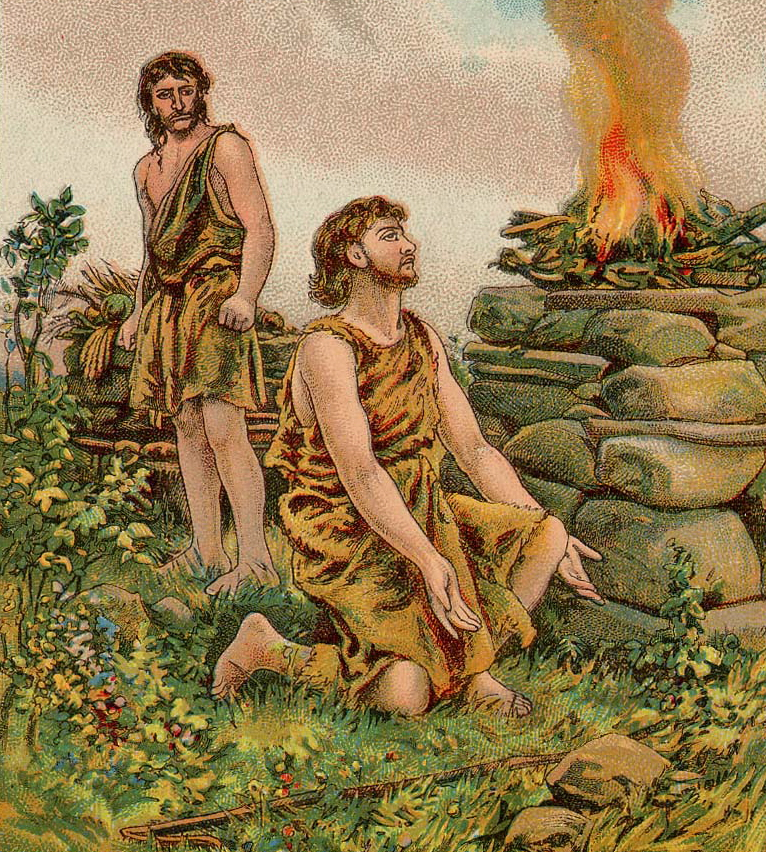
The Story of Cain and Abel (illustration from a Bible card published 1906 by the Providence Lithograph Company)

In the fourth reading, remarking that the humankind had become like God, knowing good and bad, God became concerned that they should also eat from the tree of life and live forever, so God banished them from the garden of Eden, to till the soil. God drove them out, and stationed cherubim and a fiery ever-turning sword east of the garden to guard the tree of life. A closed portion ends here with the end of chapter 3.

In the continuation of the reading in chapter 4, Eve bore Cain and Abel, who became a farmer and a shepherd, respectively. Cain brought God an offering from the fruit of the soil, and Abel brought the choicest of the firstlings of his flock. God paid heed to Abel and his offering, but not to Cain and his, distressing Cain. God asked Cain why he was distressed, because he had free will, and if he acted righteously, he would be happy, but if he did not, sin crouched at the door. Cain spoke to Abel, and when they were in the field, Cain killed Abel. When God asked Cain where his brother was, Cain replied that he did not know, asking if he was his brother's keeper. God asked Cain what he had done, as his brother's blood cried out to God from the ground. God cursed Cain to fail at farming and to become a ceaseless wanderer. Cain complained to God that his punishment was too great to bear, as anyone who met him might kill him. So God put a mark on Cain and promised to take sevenfold vengeance on anyone who would kill him. Cain left God's presence and settled in the land of Nod, east of Eden. Cain had a son, Enoch, and founded a city, and named it after Enoch. Enoch had a son Irad; and Irad had a son Mehujael; and Mehujael had a son Methushael; and Methushael had a son Lamech. The fourth reading ends here.

=== Classical rabbinic interpretation ===
The parashah is discussed in these rabbinic sources from the era of the Mishnah and the Talmud:

==== Understanding of "lifted up" ====
A baraita taught that Issi ben Judah said that there are five verses in the Torah whose grammatical construction cannot be decided, because each verse contains a phrase which a reader can link to the clause either before it or after it. Among these five is the phrase "lifted up" (שְׂאֵת, seit) in Genesis 4:7. (Note: The others he mentions are at Genesis 49:7, Exodus 17:9, 25:34 and Deuteronomy 31:16.) In the JPS translation, God says to Cain:

If thou doest well, shall it not be lifted up? and if thou doest not well, sin coucheth at the door; and unto thee is its desire, but thou mayest rule over it.

A reader could treat this as meaning: "If you do well, good! But you must bear the sin, if you do not do well", linking "lifting up" with the remembrance of Cain's sin, or, in its usual interpretation: "If you do well, there will be forgiving, or 'lifting up of face'. And if you do not do well, sin couches at the door." In the first interpretation, the reader attaches the term "lifted up" to the following clause. Taking the second approach, the reader attaches the term "lifted up" to the preceding clause.

==== Cain and Abel with yetzer hara ====
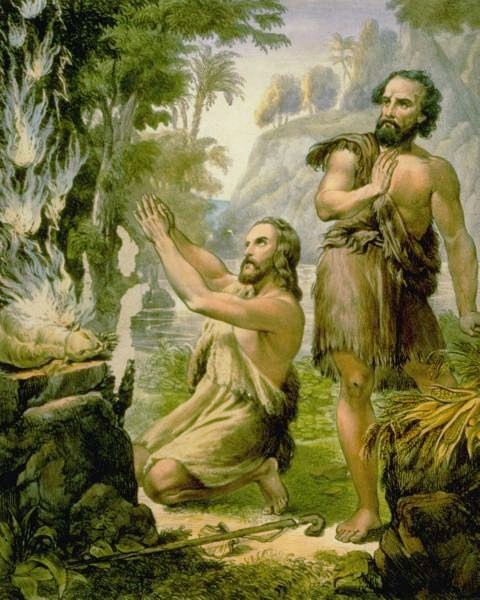
Cain and Abel (19th-century illustration)

The Rabbis read God's admonition to Cain in Genesis 4:7 to describe the conflict that one has with one's Evil Inclination (yetzer hara). The Rabbis taught in a baraita that Deuteronomy 11:18 says of the Torah, "So you fix (וְשַׂמְתֶּם, ve-samtem) these My words in your heart and in your soul." The Rabbis taught that one should read the word samtem rather as sam tam (meaning "a perfect remedy"). The Rabbis thus compared the Torah to a perfect remedy. The Rabbis compared this to a man who struck his son a strong blow, and then put a compress on the son's wound, telling his son that so long as the compress was on his wound, he could eat and drink at will, and bathe in hot or cold water, without fear. But if the son removed the compress, his skin would break out in sores. Even so, did God tell Israel that God created the Evil Inclination, but also created the Torah as its antidote. God told Israel that if they occupied themselves with the Torah, they would not be delivered into the hand of the Evil Inclination, as Genesis 4:7 says: "If you do well, shall you not be exalted?" But if Israel did not occupy themselves with the Torah, they would be delivered into the hand of the Evil Inclination, as Genesis 4:7 says: "sin couches at the door." Moreover, the Rabbis taught, the Evil Inclination is altogether preoccupied to make people sin, as Genesis 4:7 says: "and to you shall be his desire." Yet if one wishes, one can rule over the Evil Inclination, as Genesis 4:7 says: "and you shall rule over him." A baraita taught that the Evil Inclination is hard to bear, since even God its Creator called it evil, as in Genesis 8:21, God says, "the desire of man's heart is evil from his youth." Rav Isaac taught that a person's Evil Inclination renews itself against that person daily, as Genesis 6:5 says, "Every imagination of the thoughts of his heart was only evil every day." And Rabbi Simeon ben Levi (or others say Rabbi Simeon ben Lakish) taught that a person's Evil Inclination gathers strength against that person daily and seeks to slay that person, as Psalm 37:32 says, "The wicked watches the righteous, and seeks to slay him." And if God were not to help a person, one would not be able to prevail against one's Evil Inclination, for as Psalm 37:33 says, "The Lord will not leave him in his hand."

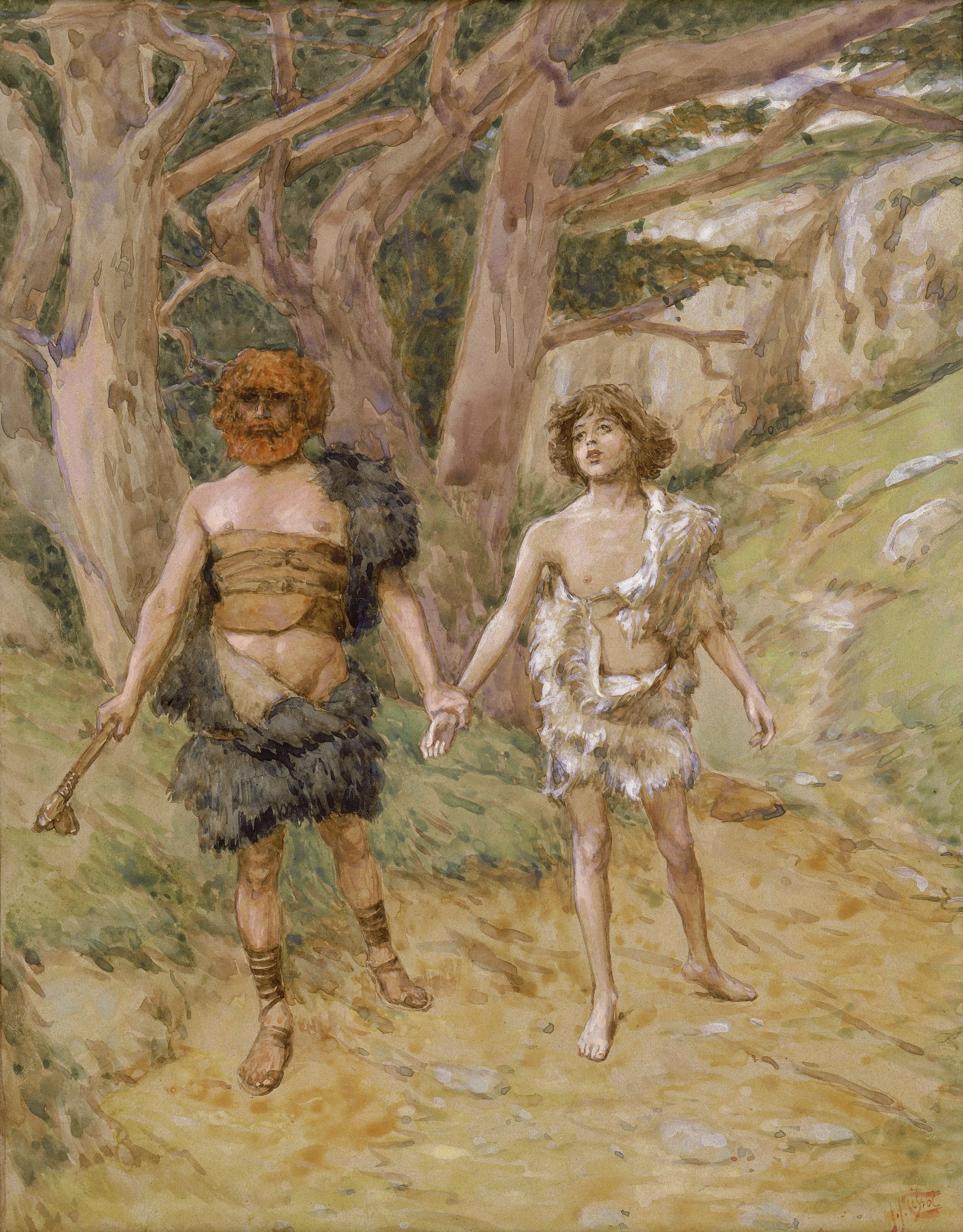
Cain leads Abel to death (watercolor circa 1896–1902 by James Tissot)

Rav taught that the evil inclination resembles a fly, which dwells between the two entrances of the heart, as Ecclesiastes 10:1 says, "Dead flies make the ointment of the perfumers fetid and putrid." But Samuel said that the evil inclination is a like a kind of wheat (חִטָּה, chitah), as Genesis 4:7 says, "Sin (חַטָּאת, chatat) couches at the door."

==== Strife of Cain and Abel ====
Reading the words of Genesis 4:8, "And Cain spoke to Abel his brother", a midrash imagined the subject of their discussion. The midrash taught that they divided the world between them. The first took the movables and the second took the land. The second told the first that he was standing on the second's land. The first retorted that the second was wearing the first's clothes. The first told the second to strip off his clothes. The second retorted that the first should fly off his ground. Out of this quarrel, as Genesis 4:8 reports, "Cain rose up against his brother Abel." Rabbi Joshua of Siknin said in Rabbi Levi's name, however, that Cain and Abel quarreled because one said that the Temple would have to be built in his area, while the other claimed that it would have to be built in his. For Genesis 4:8 says, "And it came to pass, when they were in the field," and "field" refers to the Temple, as Micah 3:12 equates the two when it says, "Sion (that is, the Temple) shall be plowed as a field." Out of this argument (in the words of Genesis 4:8), "Cain rose up against Abel his brother, and slew him." Judah the son of Rabbi, however, said that their quarrel was about the first Eve. But Rabbi Aibu said that the first Eve had by then returned to dust. Rav Huna taught that Cain and Abel quarreled over an additional twin daughter who was born with Abel, whom each brother claimed for his own. Cain said that he would have her, because he was the firstborn, while Abel maintained that he would have to have her, because she was born with him.

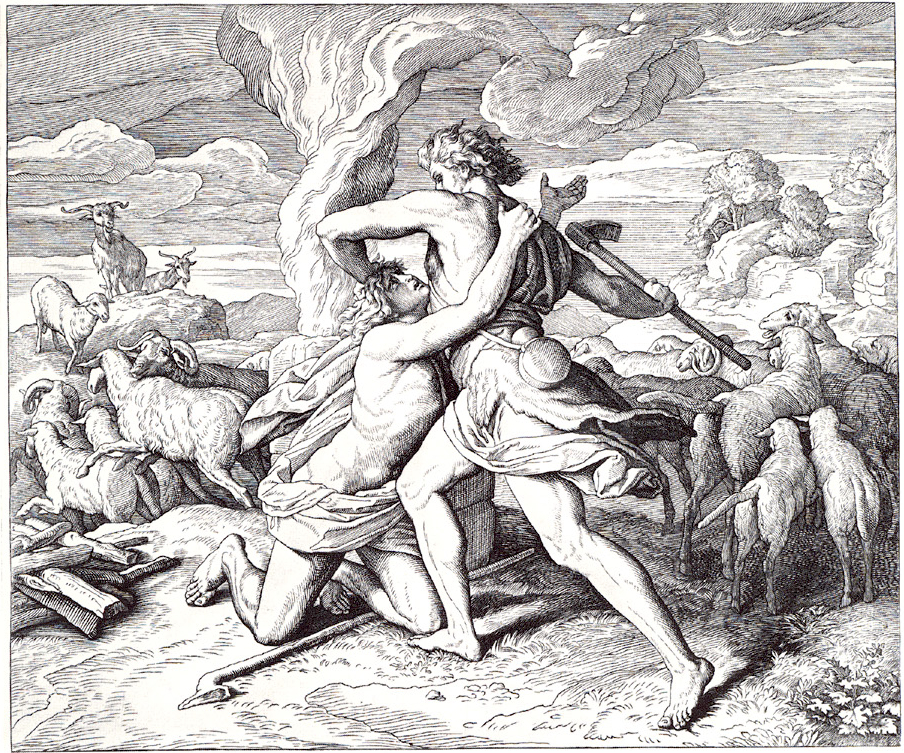
Cain Kills His Brother Abel (woodcut by Julius Schnorr von Carolsfeld from the 1860 Die Bibel in Bildern)

Reading the words of Genesis 4:8, "And Cain rose up against his brother Abel," Rabbi Joḥanan taught that Abel was stronger than Cain, for the expression "rose up" implies that Cain lay beneath Abel (as if they had already fought and Abel had thrown Cain down). From the ground, Cain asked Abel what he would tell their father if Abel killed him. At this, Abel was filled with pity for Cain and relented, and immediately Cain rose against Abel and killed him. Out of that incident was born the proverb, "Do not do good to an evil man, then evil will not befall you."

The Mishnah taught that court officials admonished witnesses testifying in capital cases to beware that the blood of the defendant and all the defendant's offspring to the end of the world depended on the witness, for Genesis 4:10 says concerning Cain that "the bloods of your brother cry ... from the ground," using the plural "bloods" to signify the victim's blood and the blood of the victim's offspring. And thus, Providence considers one who destroys a single person as one who has destroyed an entire world, and Providence considers one who saves a single person as one who has saved an entire world. The Mishnah reported that another interpretation of "brother's bloods" was that Abel's blood spattered in several places on the surrounding trees and stones.

Rabbi Simeon bar Yoḥai compared Cain and Abel to two gladiators fighting before a king. Had the king wished, he could have separated them, but he did not do so. One overcame the other and killed him. Before he died, the victim cried out to the king for help. Rabbi Simeon thus noted that changing one letter in Genesis 4:10 would cause God's statement to read, "The voice of your brother's blood cries out against Me." Rabbi Simeon said that it is difficult to say this thing, and the mouth cannot utter it plainly (but by God's inaction, God was involved in Abel's murder).

Reading in Genesis 7:4 that God said, "every living substance (יְקוּם, yekum) that I have made will I blot out," Rabbi Abin taught that this included the one who rose up (יָּקָם, yakam) against his brother—Cain. Rabbi Levi said in the name of Resh Lakish that God kept Cain's judgment in suspense until the Flood and then God swept Cain away. And thus, Rabbi Levi read Genesis 7:23 to say, "And He blotted out every one that had arisen."

=== Medieval rabbinic interpretation ===
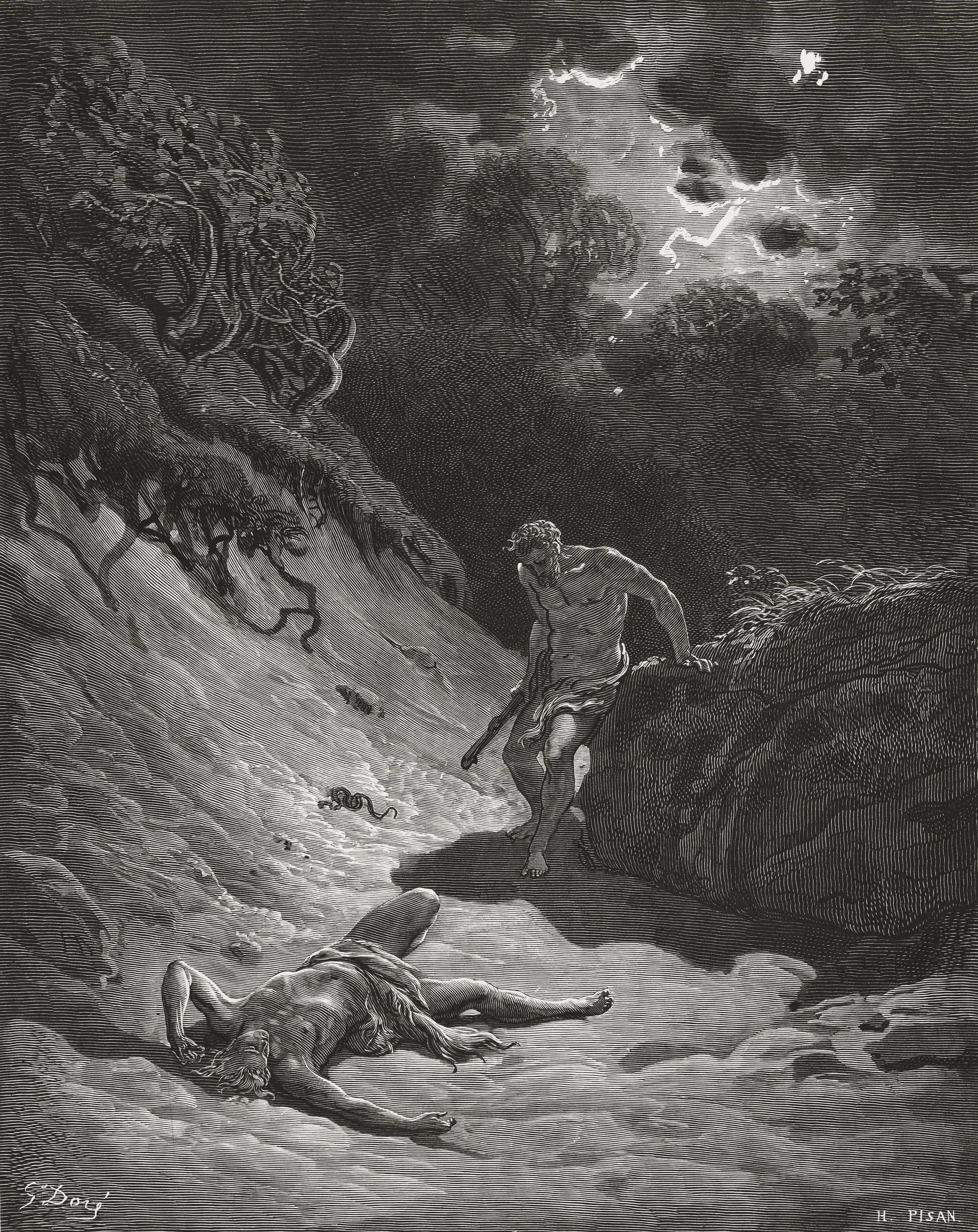
Death of Abel (engraving by Gustave Doré from the 1865 La Sainte Bible)

Judah Halevi taught that Adam lived on the land that contained the Cave of Machpelah, and it was the first object of jealousy and envy between Cain and Abel. The two brothers wanted to know which of them would succeed Adam and inherit his essence, intrinsic perfection, and land—who would stand in connection with the Divine Influence, while the other would be a nonentity. When Cain killed Abel, the realm was without an heir. Judah Halevi interpreted the words of Genesis 4:16, "Cain went out of the presence of Lord," to mean that Cain left that land, telling God (in the words of Genesis 4:14), "Behold, You have driven me out this day from the face of the earth, and from Your Face shall I be hidden."

Rashi interpreted God's words "at the entrance sin is lying" in Genesis 4:7 to mean that at the entrance of one's grave, one's sin is preserved.

Naḥmanides read God's words "And unto you is its longing" in Genesis 4:7 to teach that sin longs to always cleave to a person. Nevertheless, Genesis 4:7 teaches "you may rule over it" if one so desires, for one may mend one's ways and remove it. Thus in Genesis 4:7, Naḥmanides read God to teach Cain concerning repentance, that it lay within Cain's power to return anytime he desired, and God would forgive him.

Maimonides read Genesis 4:7 to refer to the evil inclination (yetzer ha-ra). Maimonides taught that the three terms—the adversary (הַשָּׂטָן, ha-satan), the evil inclination (yetzer ha-ra), and the angel of death—all designate the same thing. And actions ascribed to these three are the actions of one and the same agent. Maimonides taught that the Hebrew term שָּׂטָן, satan was derived from the same root as the word שְׂטֵה, seteh, "turn away," as in Proverbs 4:15, and thus implies the notion of turning and moving away from a thing. Thus, the adversary turns people away from the way of truth and leads them astray in the way of error. Maimonides taught that the same idea is contained in Genesis 8:21, "And the imagination of the heart of man is evil from his youth." Maimonides reported that the Sages also said that people receive the evil inclination at birth, for Genesis 4:7 says, "at the door sin crouches," and Genesis 8:21 says, "And the imagination of the heart of man is evil from his youth." The good inclination, however, is developed. Maimonides taught that the Sages refer to the evil inclination and the good inclination when they tell that every person is accompanied by two angels, one on the right side and one on the left, one good and one bad.

=== Modern interpretation ===
James Kugel suggested that the story of Cain may have been an etiological tale explaining characteristics of the Kenites from an Israelite standpoint.

=== Parallels in external sources ===
==== Early non-rabbinic interpretation ====
Philo saw Cain as an example of a "self-loving man" who (in Genesis 4:3) showed his gratitude to God too slowly and then not from the first of his fruits.

==== Ancient sources ====
The NIV Archaeological Study Bible notes that the word translated "crouches" (רֹבֵץ, roveitz) in Genesis 4:7 is the same as an ancient Babylonian word used to describe a demon lurking behind a door, threatening the people inside.

== Fifth reading—Genesis 4:19–22 ==
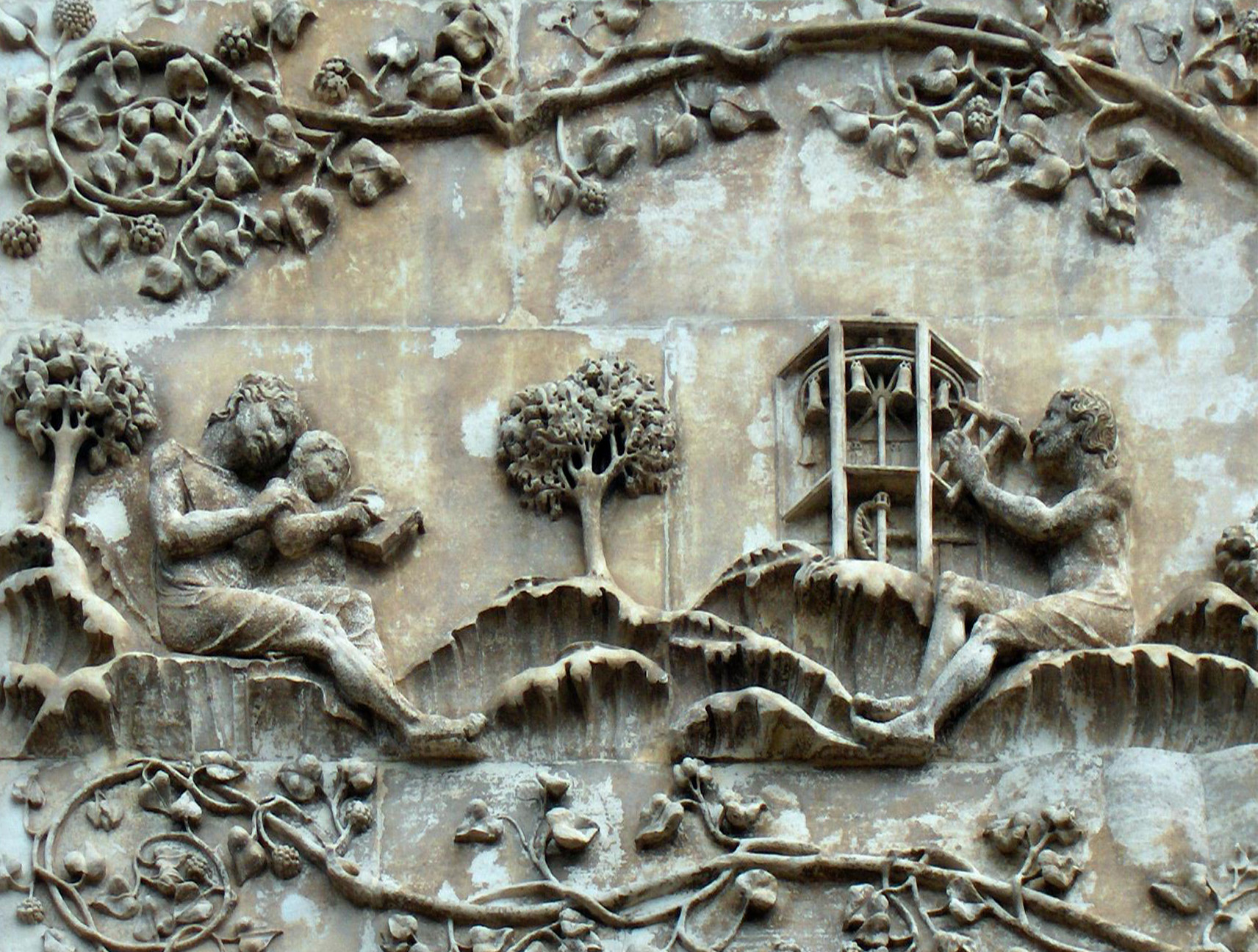
Naamah, the Teacher, with Her Half-brother Jubal, a Father of Music (14th-century marble bas relief at Orvieto Cathedral)

In the short fifth reading, Lamech took two wives, Adah and Zillah. Adah bore Jabal, the ancestor of those who dwell in tents and amidst herds, and Jubal, the ancestor of all who play the lyre and the pipe. And Zillah bore Tubal-cain, who forged implements of copper and iron. The sister of Tubal-cain was Naamah. The fifth reading ends here.

=== Classical rabbinic interpretation ===
Rabbi Abba bar Kahana said that Naamah, the sister of Tubal-cain, mentioned in Genesis 4:22, was Noah's wife. She was called Naamah, because her deeds were pleasing (ne'imim). But the Rabbis said that Naamah was a woman of a different stamp, for her name denotes that she sang (man'emet) to the timbrel in honor of idolatry.

== Sixth reading—Genesis 4:23–5:24 ==
In the sixth reading, Lamech told his wives that he had slain a young man for bruising him, and that if Cain was avenged sevenfold, then Lamech should be avenged seventy-sevenfold. Adam and Eve had a third son and named him Seth, meaning "God has provided me with another offspring in place of Abel". Seth had a son named Enosh, (Note: Genesis 4:26 and 5:6 both state that Seth had a son called Enosh.) and then men began to invoke the Lord by name. A closed portion ends here with the end of chapter 4.

After the birth of Seth, Adam had more sons and daughters, and lived a total of 930 years before he died. A closed portion ends here.

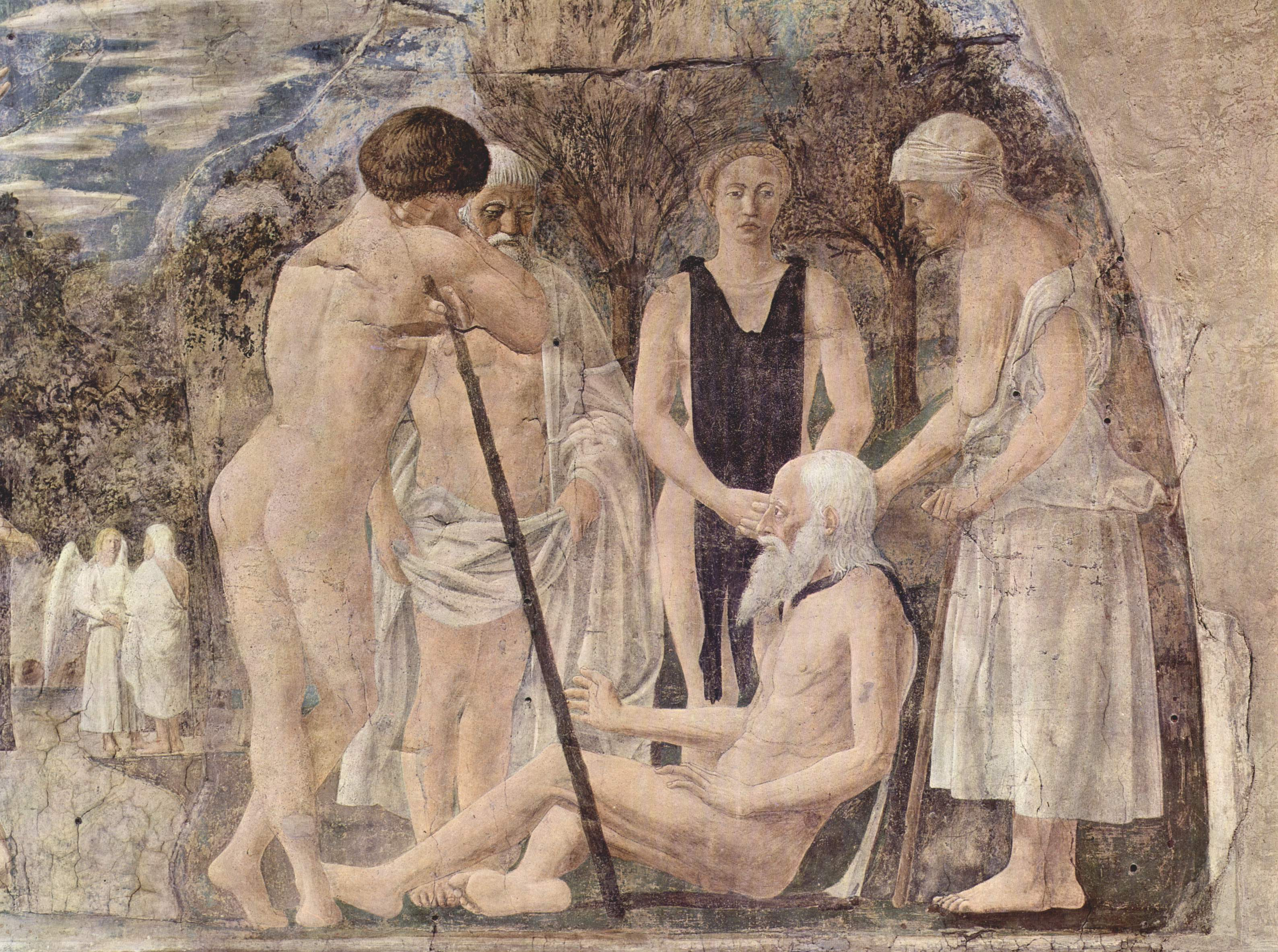
The Death of Adam (painting circa 1452–1466 by Piero della Francesca)

Adam's descendants and their lifespans are listed as follows: Seth, 912 years; Enosh, 905 years; Kenan, 910 years; Mahalalel, 895 years; and Jared, 962 years. A closed portion ends after the account of each descendant.

Jared's son Enoch had a son Methuselah and subsequently walked with God for 300 years, and when Enoch reached age 365, God took him. The sixth reading and a closed portion end here.

=== Classical rabbinic interpretation ===
The parashah is discussed in these rabbinic sources from the era of the Mishnah and the Talmud:

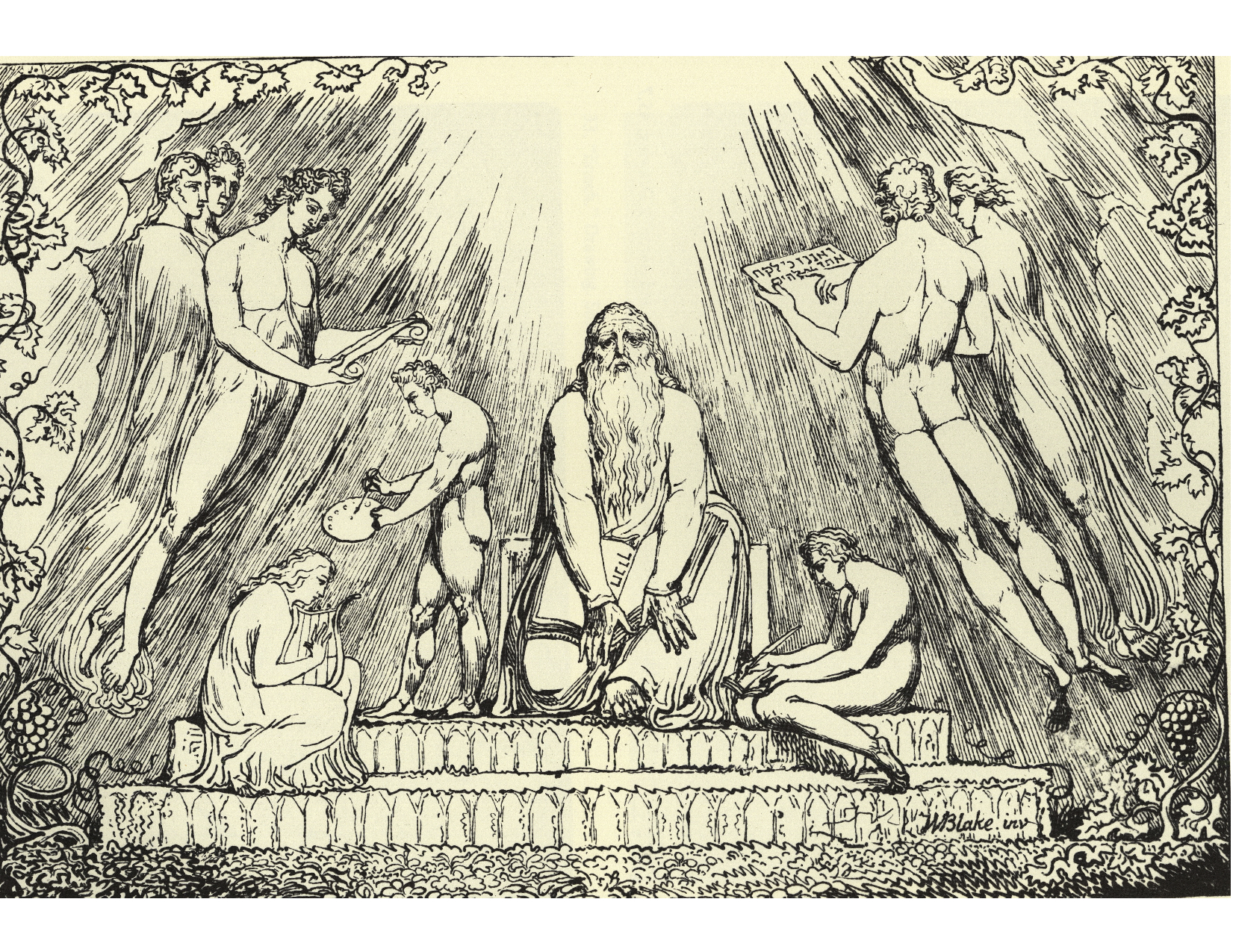
Enoch walked with God; then was no more, because God took him (Genesis 5:24) (1807 lithograph by William Blake)

==== Generations of Adam ====
Rabbi Akiva said that the words of Leviticus 19:18, "You shall love your neighbor as yourself", are the great general rule of the Torah. But Ben Azzai said that the words of Genesis 5:1, "This is the book of the generations of Adam. In the day that God created humankind, it was in the likeness of God", are an even greater general rule of the Torah.

The Mishnah taught that Genesis 5:1–31 enumerated ten generations from Adam to Noah to demonstrate how patient God is, for according to the Mishnah, all those generations provoked God, until God brought on them the waters of the flood.

Rabbi Tanḥuma taught in Rabbi Banayah's name, and Rabbi Berekiah taught in Rabbi Eleazar's name, that God created Adam a shapeless mass, and Adam lay stretching from one end of the world to the other, as Psalm 139:16 says, "Your eyes did see my shapeless mass." Rabbi Judah ben Rabbi Simon taught that while Adam lay a shapeless mass before God, God showed Adam every succeeding generation of mankind and its Sages, judges, scribes, interpreters, and leaders. God told Adam, in the words of Psalm 139:16, "Your eyes did see unformed substance," Adam's potential descendants, and God told Adam that all of those descendants had already been written in the book of Adam, as Genesis 5:1 says: "This is the book of the generations of Adam."

==== Creation of male and female ====
Rabbi Eleazar read the words of Genesis 5:2, "male and female created He them, and called their name 'man,'" and deduced that one cannot be a complete "man" unless one is married.

The Mishnah taught that a man should not give up trying to be fruitful and multiply unless he has children. The House of Shammai said unless he has two boys. The House of Hillel said unless he has a boy and a girl, since Genesis 5:2 says, "male and female created He them".

A baraita taught that when King Ptolemy brought together 72 elders, placed them in 72 separate rooms without telling them why, and directed each of them to translate the Torah, God prompted each one of them and they all conceived the same idea and wrote for Genesis 5:2, "Male and female He created him" (instead of "created them," to prevent readers from reading that God created more than one person at the start).

==== Adam's likeness and image ====
Rabbi Jeremiah ben Eleazar read Genesis 5:3, "And Adam lived 130 years and begot a son in his own likeness, after his own image," to imply that until that time, Adam did not beget after his own image. Rabbi Jeremiah ben Eleazar thus concluded that in the 130 years after Adam’s expulsion from the Garden of Eden, Adam begot ghosts and demons. But Rabbi Meir taught that Adam was a great saint. According to Rabbi Meir, when Adam saw that through him death was ordained as a punishment, he spent 130 years fasting, severed connection with his wife, and wore clothes of fig leaves. Thus, the Gemara asked how Adam could have begotten evil beings. The Gemara suggested an explanation to harmonize the two positions: the semen that Adam emitted accidentally caused ghosts and demons to come into being.

In contrast, the Pirke De-Rabbi Eliezer read Genesis 5:3, "And Adam lived 130 years and begot a son in his own likeness, after his own image," to imply that Cain was not of Adam's seed, nor after his likeness, nor after his image. The Pirke De-Rabbi Eliezer taught that Adam did not beget in his own image until Seth was born, who was after his father Adam’s likeness and image. Thus, Rabbi Simeon taught that from Seth arose and were descended all the generations of the righteous. And from Cain arose and were descended all the generations of the wicked.

==== Enoch (Genesis 5:24) ====
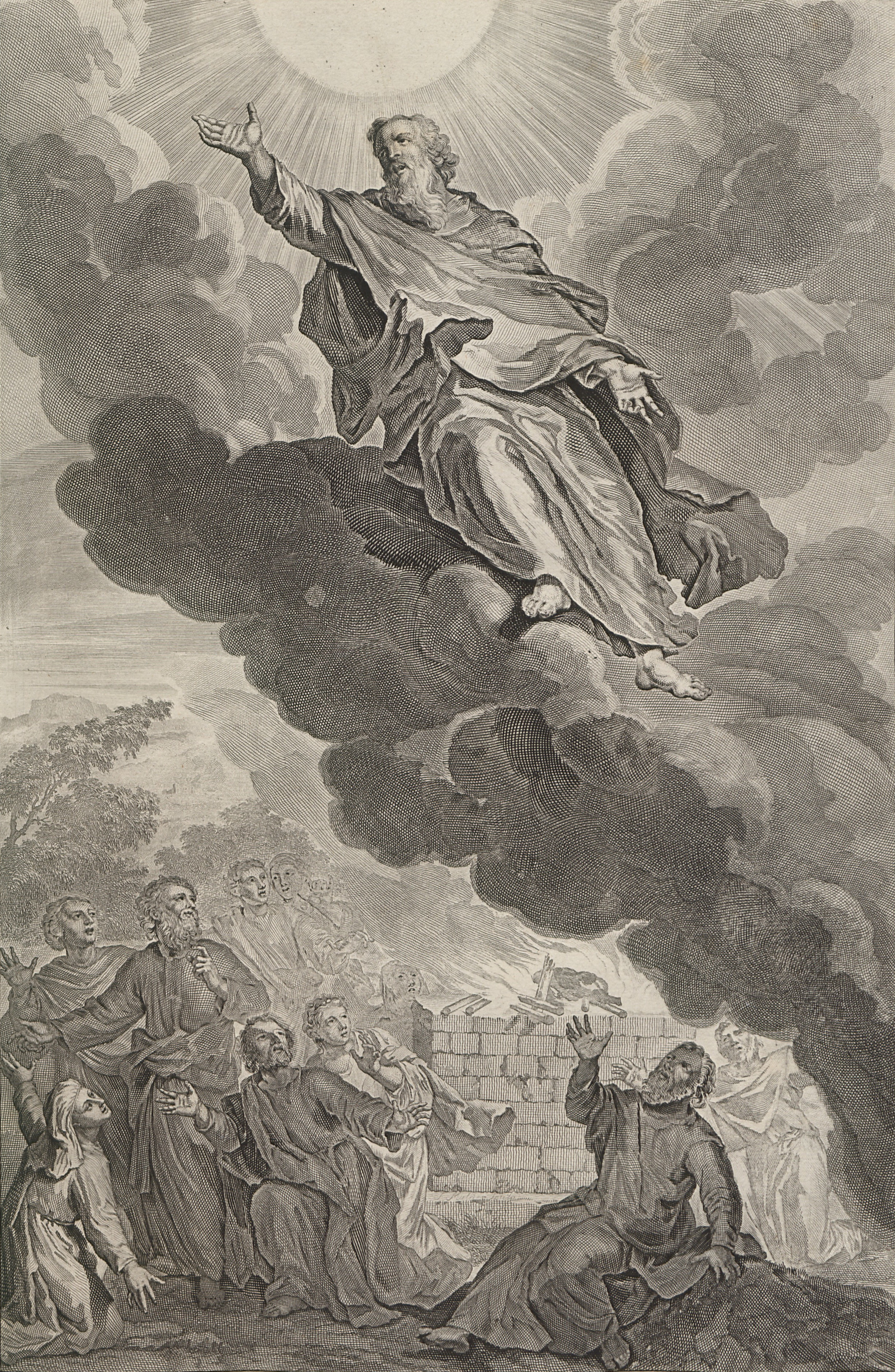
God Took Enoch (illustration from the 1728 Figures de la Bible)

Noting that Genesis 5:24 says of Enoch not that he died, but that "God took him," some sectarians challenged Rabbi Abbahu, saying that they did not find that Enoch died, but that God "took" him, just as 2 Kings 2:1 says that God would "take" Elijah. Rabbi Abbahu reasoned that one could read the verb "took" in Genesis 5:24 just as "take" is used in Ezekiel 24:16, which says, "Behold, I take away from you the desire of your eyes," and there "take" definitely refers to death.

Also interpreting Genesis 5:24, Rabbi Aibu taught that Enoch was a hypocrite, acting sometimes righteously and sometimes wickedly. So God removed Enoch while Enoch was acting righteously, judging Enoch on Rosh Hashanah, when God judges the whole world.

=== Inner-biblical interpretation ===
1 Chronicles 1:1–4 briefly summarizes the names of Adam's line recounted in Genesis 5.

== Seventh reading—Genesis 5:25–6:8 ==
In the seventh reading, Methuselah had a son Lamech and lived 969 years. A closed portion ends here.

Lamech had a son, Noah, saying that Noah would provide relief from their work and toil on the soil that God had cursed. Lamech lived 777 years. A closed portion ends here.

When Noah had lived 500 years, he had three sons: Shem, Ham, and Japheth. God set the days allowed to man at 120 years. Divine beings admired and took wives from among the daughters of men, who bore the Nephilim, heroes of old, men of renown. The ninth open portion ends here.

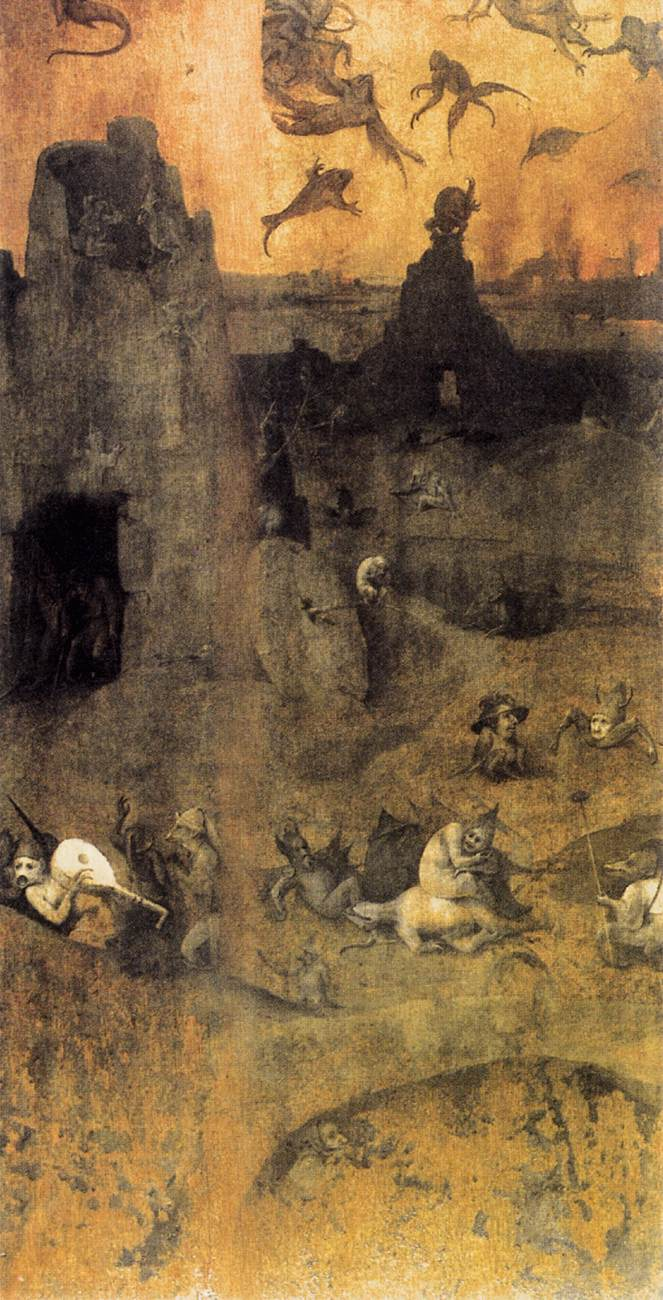
The Fall of the Rebel Angels by Hieronymus Bosch is based on Genesis 6:1–4

In the maftir (מפטיר) reading that concludes the parashah, God saw how great man's wickedness was and how man's every plan was evil, and God regretted making man. God expressed an intention to blot men and animals from the earth, but Noah found God's favor. The seventh reading, the tenth open portion, and the parashah end here.

=== Classical rabbinic interpretation ===
The parashah is discussed in these rabbinic sources from the era of the Mishnah and the Talmud:

==== "Vayehi" ====
Rabbi Levi, or some say Rabbi Jonathan, said that a tradition handed down from the Men of the Great Assembly taught that wherever the Bible employs the term "and it was" or "and it came to pass" (וַיְהִי, va-yehi), as it does in Genesis 6:1, it indicates misfortune, as one can read wa-yehi as wai, hi, "woe, sorrow." Thus, the words, "And it came to pass when man began to multiply," in Genesis 6:1, are followed by the words, "God Saw that the wickedness of man was great," in Genesis 6:5. And the Gemara also cited the instances of Genesis 11:2 followed by Genesis 11:4; Genesis 14:1 followed by Genesis 14:2; Joshua 5:13 followed by the rest of Joshua 5:13; Joshua 6:27 followed by Joshua 7:1; 1 Samuel 1:1 followed by 1 Samuel 1:5; 1 Samuel 8:1 followed by 1 Samuel 8:3; 1 Samuel 18:14 close after 1 Samuel 18:9; 2 Samuel 7:1 followed by 1 Kings 8:19; Ruth 1:1 followed by the rest of Ruth 1:1; and Esther 1:1 followed by Haman. But the Gemara also cited as counterexamples the words, "And there was evening and there was morning one day," in Genesis 1:5, as well as Genesis 29:10, and 1 Kings 6:1. So Rav Ashi replied that wa-yehi sometimes presages misfortune, and sometimes it does not, but the expression "and it came to pass in the days of" always presages misfortune. And for that proposition, the Gemara cited Genesis 14:1, Isaiah 7:1, Jeremiah 1:3, Ruth 1:1, and Esther 1:1.

==== "Sons of God" ====
Reading the words of Genesis 6:2, "the sons of God (בְנֵי-הָאֱלֹהִים, bene elohim) saw the daughters of men," Rabbi Simeon bar Yoḥai called them "the sons of nobles," and Rabbi Simeon bar Yoḥai cursed all who called them "the sons of God." Rabbi Simeon bar Yoḥai taught that all real demoralization proceeds from the leaders, as they are able to stop it. Rabbi Ḥaninah and Resh Lakish reasoned that Genesis 6:2 calls them "the sons of God" because they lived a long time without trouble or suffering.

==== Reason or scope of the judgement ====
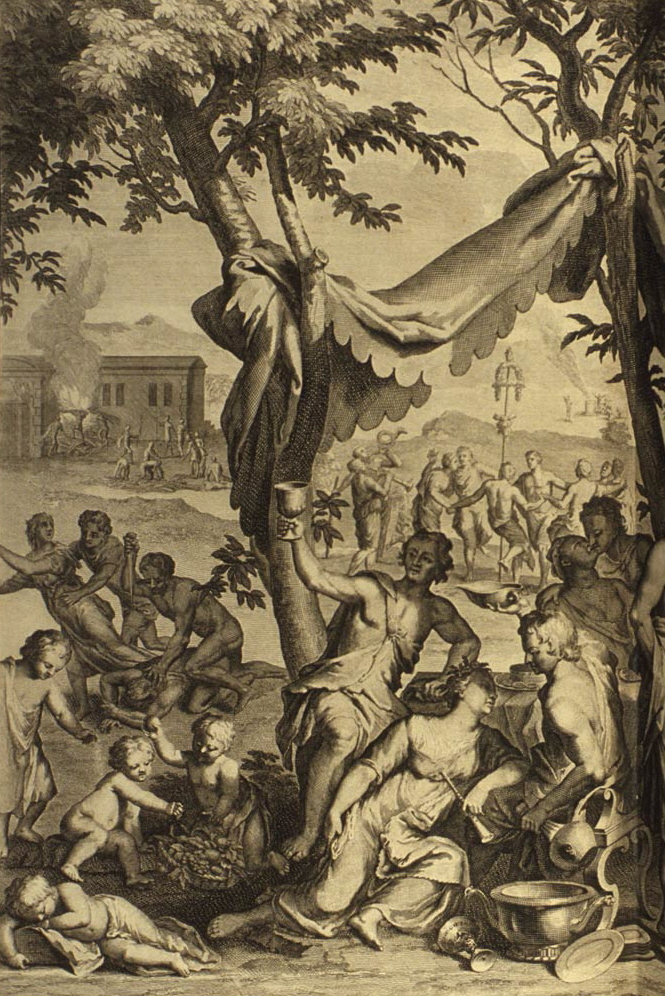
Left plate of The Earth Was Corrupt before God and Filled with Violence (illustration from the 1728 Figures de la Bible)

Rav Huna said in Rav Joseph's name that the generation of the flood were not blotted out from the world until they composed nuptial songs (or others say, wrote marriage contracts) in honor of pederasty and bestiality.

The Mishnah concluded that the generation of the Flood and the generation of the dispersion after the Tower of Babel were both so evil as to have no share in the world to come. Rabbi Akiva deduced from the words of Genesis 7:23 that the generation of the Flood will have no portion in the world to come; he read the words "and every living substance was destroyed" to refer to this world and the words "that was on the face of the ground" to refer to the next world. Rabbi Judah ben Bathyra deduced from the words "My spirit will not always enter into judgment with man" of Genesis 6:3 that God will neither revive nor judge the generation of the flood on Judgment Day.

Noting that Genesis 6:9 calls Noah "a man" (אִישׁ, ish), a midrash taught that wherever Scripture employs the term "a man" (אִישׁ, ish), it indicates a righteous man who warned his generation. The midrash taught that for 120 years (deduced from Genesis 6:3), Noah planted cedars and cut them down. When they would ask him what he was doing, he would reply that God had informed him that God was bringing a flood. Noah's contemporaries replied that if a flood did come, it would come only on Noah's father's house. Rabbi Abba taught that God said that one herald arose for God in the generation of the Flood—Noah. But they despised him and called him a contemptible old man.

The School of Rabbi Ishmael deduced from Genesis 6:8 that death was decreed against Noah too, but that he found favor in the eyes of God.

==== The flood ====
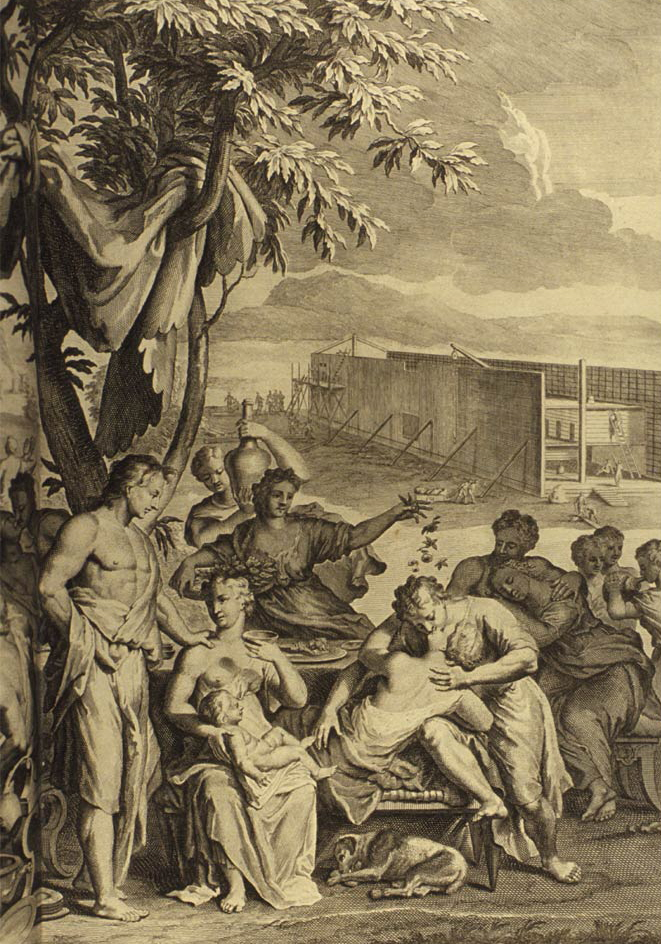
Right plate of The Earth Was Corrupt before God and Filled with Violence (illustration from the 1728 Figures de la Bible)

Reading in Genesis 7:10 that "it came to pass, after seven days, that the waters of the flood were upon the earth," the Gemara asked what the nature of these seven days was (that God delayed the flood on their account). Rav taught that these were the days of mourning for Methuselah, and thus that lamenting the righteous postpones retribution. Another explanation is that during "the seven days" God reversed the order of nature (בְּרֵאשִׁית, bereishit) (established at the beginning of creation), and the sun rose in the west and set in the east (so that sinners might be shocked into repentance). Another explanation is that God first appointed for them a long time (the 120 years to which Genesis 6:3 alludes), and then a short time (a seven-day grace period in which to repent). Another explanation is that during "the seven days," God gave them a foretaste of the world to come, so that they might know the nature of the rewards of which they were depriving themselves.

The Tosefta taught that the flood killed people before animals (as seen in the order of Genesis 7:23), because man sinned first (as shown in Genesis 6:5).

Rabbi Joḥanan taught that because the corruption of the generation of the flood was great, their punishment was also great. Genesis 6:5 characterizes their corruption as great (רַבָּה, rabbah), saying, "And God saw that the wickedness of man was great in the earth." And Genesis 7:11 characterizes their punishment as great (רַבָּה, rabbah), saying, "on the same day were all the fountains of the great deep broken up." Rabbi Joḥanan reported that three of those great thermal fountains remained open after the Flood—the gulf of Gader, the hot-springs of Tiberias, and the great well of Biram.

==== Heart capabilities ====
The midrash catalogued the wide range of additional capabilities of the heart reported in the Hebrew Bible and mentions in Genesis 6:6, the heart grieves. According to the midrash, elsewhere in the bible besides genesis 6, the heart speaks, sees, hears, walks, falls, stands, rejoices, cries, is comforted, is troubled, becomes hardened, grows faint, fears, can be broken, becomes proud, rebels, invents, cavils, overflows, devises, desires, goes astray, lusts, is refreshed, can be stolen, is humbled, is enticed, errs, trembles, is awakened, loves, hates, envies, is searched, is rent, meditates, is like a fire, is like a stone, turns in repentance, becomes hot, dies, melts, takes in words, is susceptible to fear, gives thanks, covets, becomes hard, makes merry, acts deceitfully, speaks from out of itself, loves bribes, writes words, plans, receives commandments, acts with pride, makes arrangements, and aggrandizes itself.

=== Modern interpretation ===
Baruch Spinoza argued that Scripture often uses the term "Spirit of the Lord" as equivalent to the human mind, as in Genesis 6:3, "My Spirit shall not always strive with man, for that he also is flesh," which Spinoza read to mean "since man acts on the dictates of his body, and not the spirit that I gave him to discern the good, I will let him alone."

Amy-Jill Levine suggested that the reference in Genesis 6:4 to the "sons of God" who abused their position may refer disapprovingly to "the young men who grew up with" Israelite King Rehoboam referred to in 1 Kings 12:8–10 who counselled Rehoboam to increase the burdens on the people.

== Commandments ==
According to the Sefer ha-Chinuch, a noted authority on the commandments, there is one positive commandment in the parashah:

- To "be fruitful and multiply"

Maimonides, however, attributes the commandment to Genesis 9:7.

== Haftarah ==
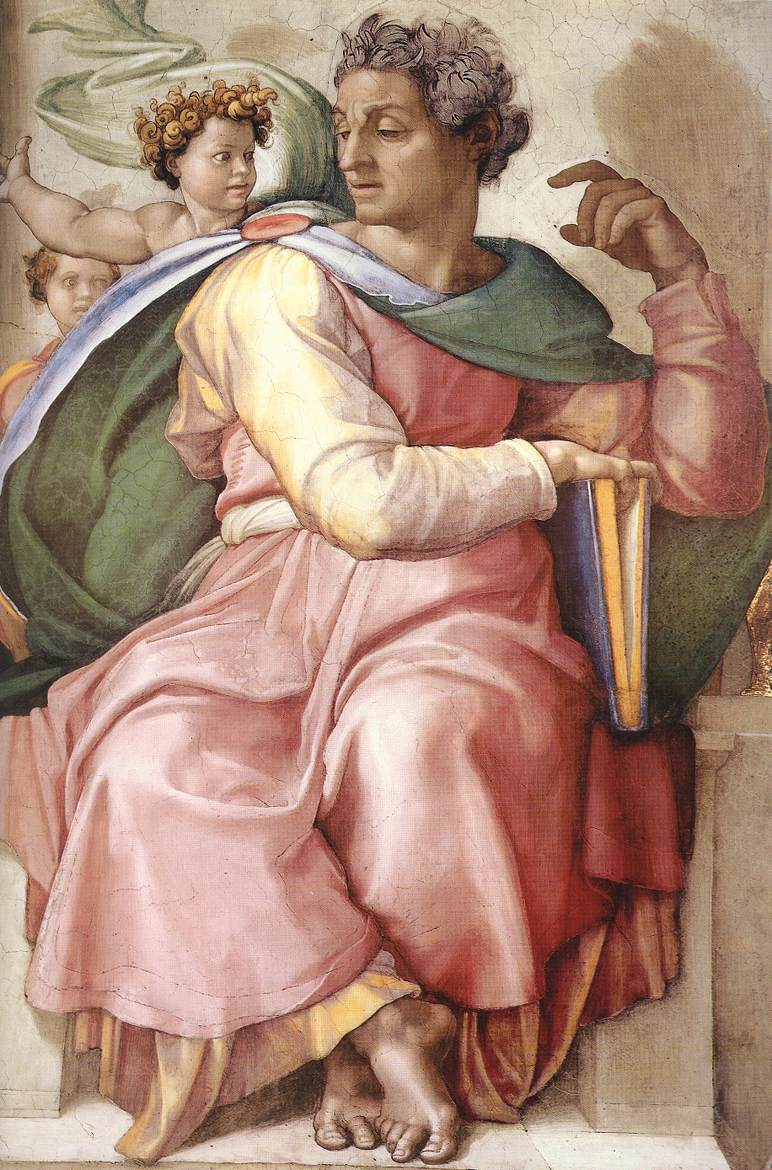
Isaiah (1509 fresco by Michelangelo in the Sistine Chapel)

A haftarah is a text selected from the books of Nevi'im (the Prophets) that is read publicly in the synagogue after the reading of the Torah on Sabbath and holiday mornings. The haftarah usually has a thematic link to the Torah reading that precedes it.

The specific text read following Parashat Bereshit varies according to different traditions within Judaism. Examples are:

- for Ashkenazi Jews: Isaiah 42:5–43:10
- for Sephardi Jews, Frankfurt am Main, and Chabad Lubavitch: Isaiah 42:5–21
- for Yemenite Jews: Isaiah 42:1–16
- for Italian Jews: Isaiah 42:1–21
- for Karaite Jews: Isaiah 65:7–66:13

The parashah and haftarah in Isaiah 42 both report God's absolute power. Genesis 1:1–2:4 and Isaiah 42:5 both tell of God's creation of heaven and earth. The haftarah in Isaiah 42:6–7, 16 echoes the word "light" (and God's control of it) from Genesis 1:3–5 but puts the word to broader use. And the haftarah puts the idea of "opening . . . eyes" (in Isaiah 42:7) in more favorable light than does the parashah (in Genesis 3:5–7).

== In the liturgy ==
The first word of Genesis 1:1, בְּרֵאשִׁית, bereishit, and thus God's role as Creator, is recited in the Aleinu prayer near the end of each of the three daily prayer services.

God's creation of heaven and earth in Genesis 1:1 is reflected in Psalm 96:5, 11, which is in turn one of the six Psalms recited at the beginning of the Kabbalat Shabbat prayer service.

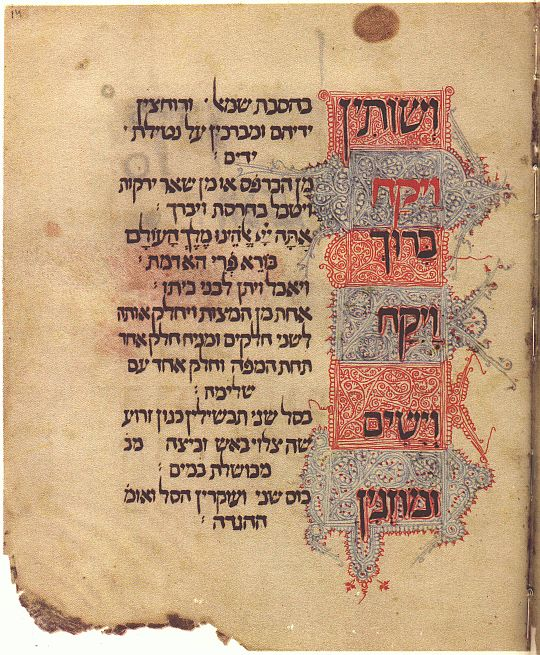
A page from the Kaufmann Haggadah

The waters of creation in Genesis 1:2 may be reflected in Psalm 29:3, which is in turn one of the six Psalms recited at the beginning of the Kabbalat Shabbat prayer service.

At the beginning of the K'riat Sh'ma prayer service, following the Barchu, Jews recite a blessing that acknowledges God's miracle of creation, noting, among other acts, God's "separating day from night," as recounted in Genesis 1:18.

In the Passover Haggadah, if the Seder takes place on Friday night, then many Jews recite Genesis 1:31–2:3 or 2:1–3 at the beginning of the Kiddush section of the Seder.

Following the Kabbalat Shabbat service and prior to the Friday evening (Ma'ariv) service, Jews traditionally read rabbinic sources on the observance of the Sabbath, including an excerpt from Babylonian Talmud Shabbat 119b. In Shabbat 119b, Rava instructed that one should recite Genesis 2:1–3 on the eve of the Sabbath.

The Lekhah Dodi liturgical poem of the Kabbalat Shabbat prayer service reflects the role of the Sabbath described in Genesis 2:2–3, characterizing the Sabbath as the "last of the work (of Creation)" (sof ma'aseh).

Reuven Kimelman found in the "awake and arise" stanza of the Lekhah Dodi poem a play between the root or, from which stems the word for "skin" or "leather," and the homonym or that means "light." In Genesis 3:21, Adam exchanged garments of light for garments of leather; the Lekhah Dodi poem calls on God to exchange our current garments of skin for garments of light. Similarly, the morning blessing, "Who clothes the naked," echoes the report of Genesis 3:21 that God clothed Adam and Eve.

The "Divine beings" or "sons of God" mentioned in Genesis 6:2 are reflected in Psalm 29:1, which is in turn one of the six Psalms recited at the beginning of the Kabbalat Shabbat prayer service.

=== The Weekly Maqam ===
In the Weekly Maqam, Sephardi Jews each week base the songs of the services on the content of that week's parashah. For Parashat Bereshit, which begins the Torah, Sephardi Jews apply Maqam Rast, the maqam that shows a beginning or an initiation of something.

== Readings in the triennial cycle ==
Jews who read the Torah according to the triennial cycle of Torah reading read the parashah according to the following schedule:

	Year 1	Year 2	Year 3
	2025, 2028, 2031 ...	2026, 2029, 2032 ...	2027, 2030, 2033 ...
Reading	1:1–2:3	2:4–4:26	5:1–6:8
1	1:1–5	2:4–9	5:1–5
2	1:6–8	2:10–19	5:6–8
3	1:9–13	2:20–25	5:9–14
4	1:14–19	3:1–21	5:15–20
5	1:20–23	3:22–24	5:21–24
6	1:24–31	4:1–18	5:25–31
7	2:1–3	4:19–26	5:32–6:8
Maftir	2:1–3	4:23–26	6:5–8

== See also ==
- Adam in rabbinic literature
- Curse and mark of Cain
- Fall of man
- Noah in rabbinic literature
