= Khemenu =

Khemenu (Ḫmnw) may refer to:

- the Ogdoad (Egyptian), the eight primordial deities worshipped in Hermopolis.
- Hermopolis, a major city in the ancient Egypt (Roman province).
