= Heh (god) =

Ancient Egyptian personification of infinity or eternity

- An aspect of Heh, holding a pair of notched palm branches
Name in hieroglyphs
C11 or V28 V28 G43 A40
- Major cult center: Hermopolis (as a member of the Ogdoad)
- Symbol: palm branch
- Consort: Hauhet

Hauhet
- Hauhet was often represented with a cobra head like other female members of the Ogdoad
Name in hieroglyphs
V28 V28 G43 X1 H8 B1
- Major cult center: Hermopolis (as a member of the Ogdoad)
- Symbol: palm branch
- Consort: Heh

Hẹh (hẹh, also Huh, Hah, Hauh, Huah, and Hehu) was the personification of infinity or eternity in the Ogdoad in ancient Egyptian religion. His name originally meant "flood", referring to the watery chaos Nu that the Egyptians believed existed before the creation of the world. The Egyptians envisioned this chaos as infinite, in contrast with the finite created world, so Heh personified this aspect of the primordial waters. Heh's female counterpart and consort was known as Hauhet, which is simply the feminine form of his name.

Like the other concepts in the Ogdoad, his male form was often depicted as a frog, or a frog-headed human, and his female form as a snake or snake-headed human. The frog head symbolised fertility, creation, and regeneration, and was also possessed by the other Ogdoad males Kek, Amun, and Nun. The other common representation depicts him crouching, holding a palm stem in each hand (or just one), sometimes with a palm stem in his hair, as palm stems represented long life to the Egyptians, the years being represented by notches on it. Depictions of this form also had a shen ring at the base of each palm stem, which represented infinity. Depictions of Heh were also used in hieroglyphs to represent one million, which was essentially considered equivalent to infinity in Egyptian numerals. Thus, this deity is also known as the "god of millions of years".

== Origins and mythology ==
The primary meaning of the Egyptian word ḥeḥ was "million" or "millions"; a personification of this concept, Ḥeḥ, was adopted as the Egyptian god of infinity. With his female counterpart Ḥauḥet (or Ḥeḥut), Ḥeḥ represented one of the four god-goddess pairs comprising the Ogdoad, a pantheon of eight primeval deities whose worship was centred at Hermopolis Magna. The mythology of the Ogdoad describes its eight members, Heh and Hauhet, Nu and Naunet, Amun and Amaunet, and Kuk and Kauket, coming together in the cataclysmic event that gives rise to the sun (and its deific personification, Atum). Heh's major role in creation was largely by providing an infinite backdrop for creation, allowing the other gods limitless space and potential to bring forth the universe's first elements.

Heh sometimes helps Shu, a god associated with air, in supporting the sky goddess Nut. In the Book of the Heavenly Cow, eight Heh gods are depicted together with Shu supporting Nut, who has taken the form of a cow.

== Forms and iconography ==
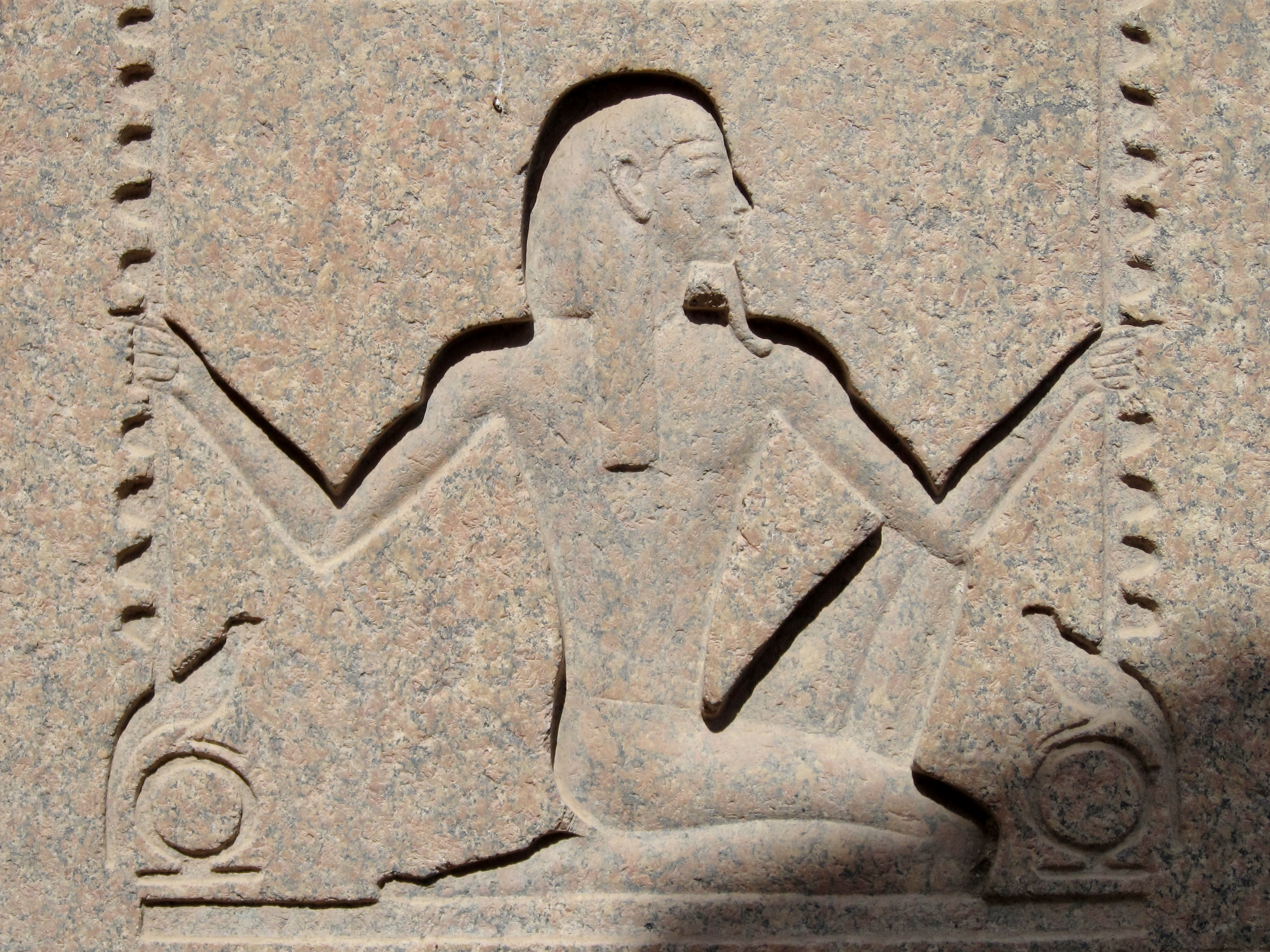
A relief depicting Heh holding two palm ribs from the Temple of Ramesses II, Abydos

The god Ḥeḥ was usually depicted anthropomorphically, as in the hieroglyphic character, as a male figure with divine beard and lappet wig. Normally kneeling (one knee raised), sometimes in a basket—the sign for "all", the god typically holds in each hand a notched palm branch (palm rib). (These were employed in the temples for ceremonial time-keeping, which use explains the use of the palm branch as the hieroglyphic symbol for rnp.t, "year"). Occasionally, an additional palm branch is worn on the god's head.

In Ancient Egyptian Numerology, Gods such as Heh were used to represent numbers in a decimal point system. Particularly, the number 1,000,000 is depicted in the hieroglyph of Heh, who is in his normal seated position.

== Cult and worship ==
The personified, somewhat abstract god of eternity Ḥeḥ possessed no known cult centre or sanctuary; rather, his veneration revolved around symbolism and personal belief. The god's image and its iconographic elements reflected the wish for millions of years of life or rule; as such, the figure of Ḥeḥ finds frequent representation in amulets, prestige items and royal iconography from the late Old Kingdom period onwards. Heh became associated with the King and his quest for longevity. For instance, he appears on the tomb of King Tutankhamen, in two cartouches, where he is crowned with a winged scarab beetle, symbolizing existence and a sun disk. The placement of Heh in relation to King Tutankhamen's corpse means he will be granting him these "millions of years" into the afterlife.

== Gallery ==
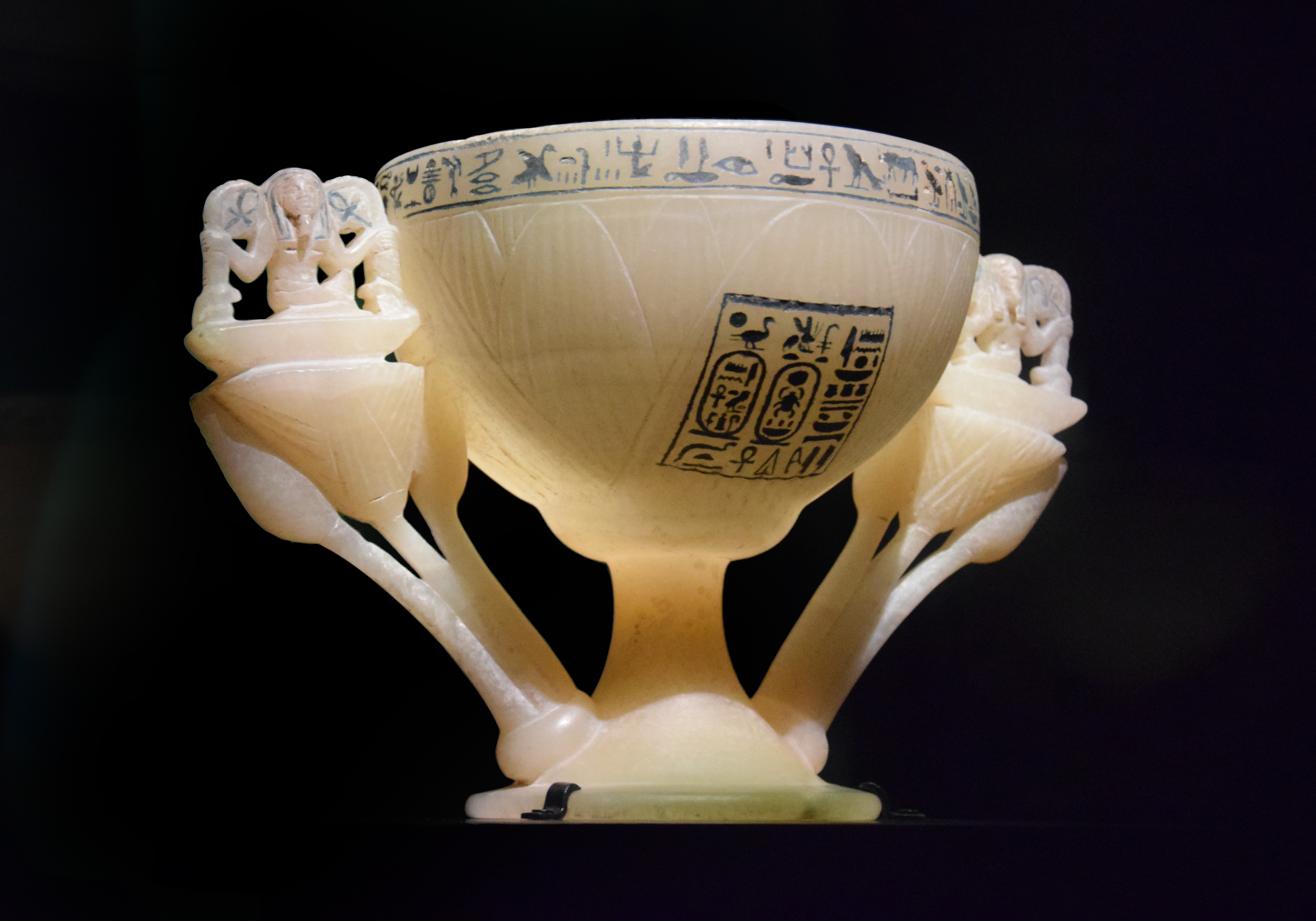
Tutankhamun's alabaster lotus chalice, with Heh being depicted atop the handles

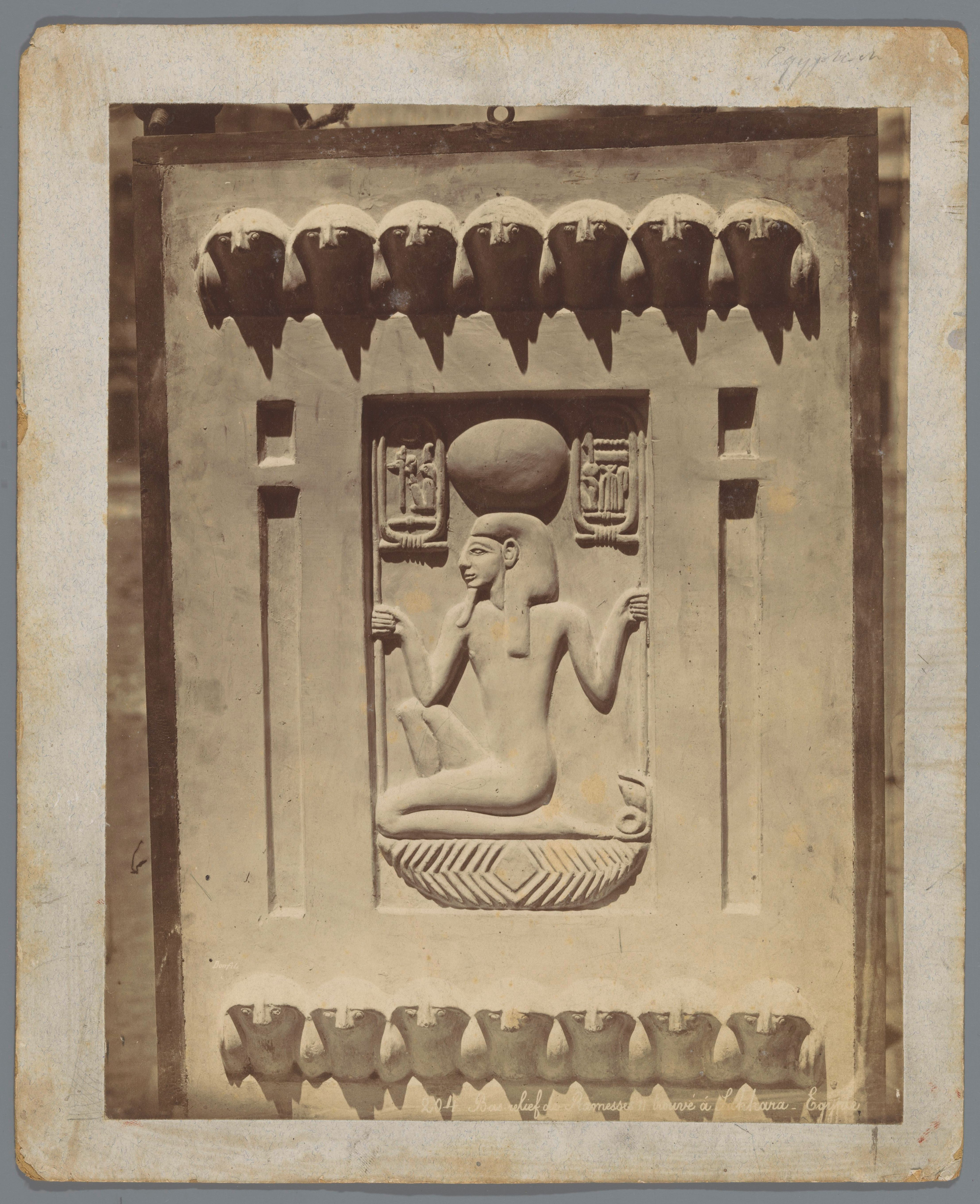
Bas-relief of Heh

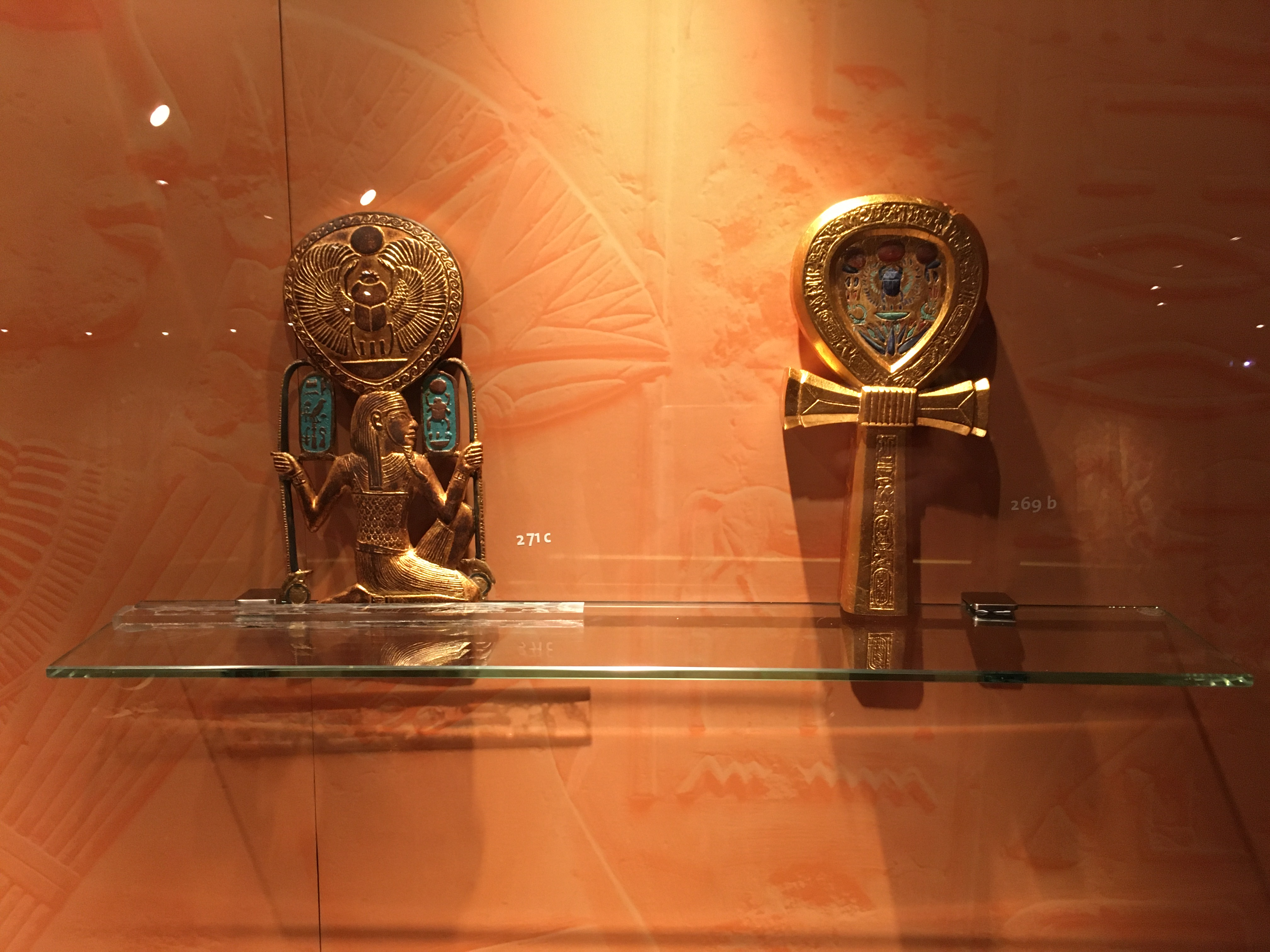
The mirror case found in Tutankhamun's tomb takes the form of the god Heh.

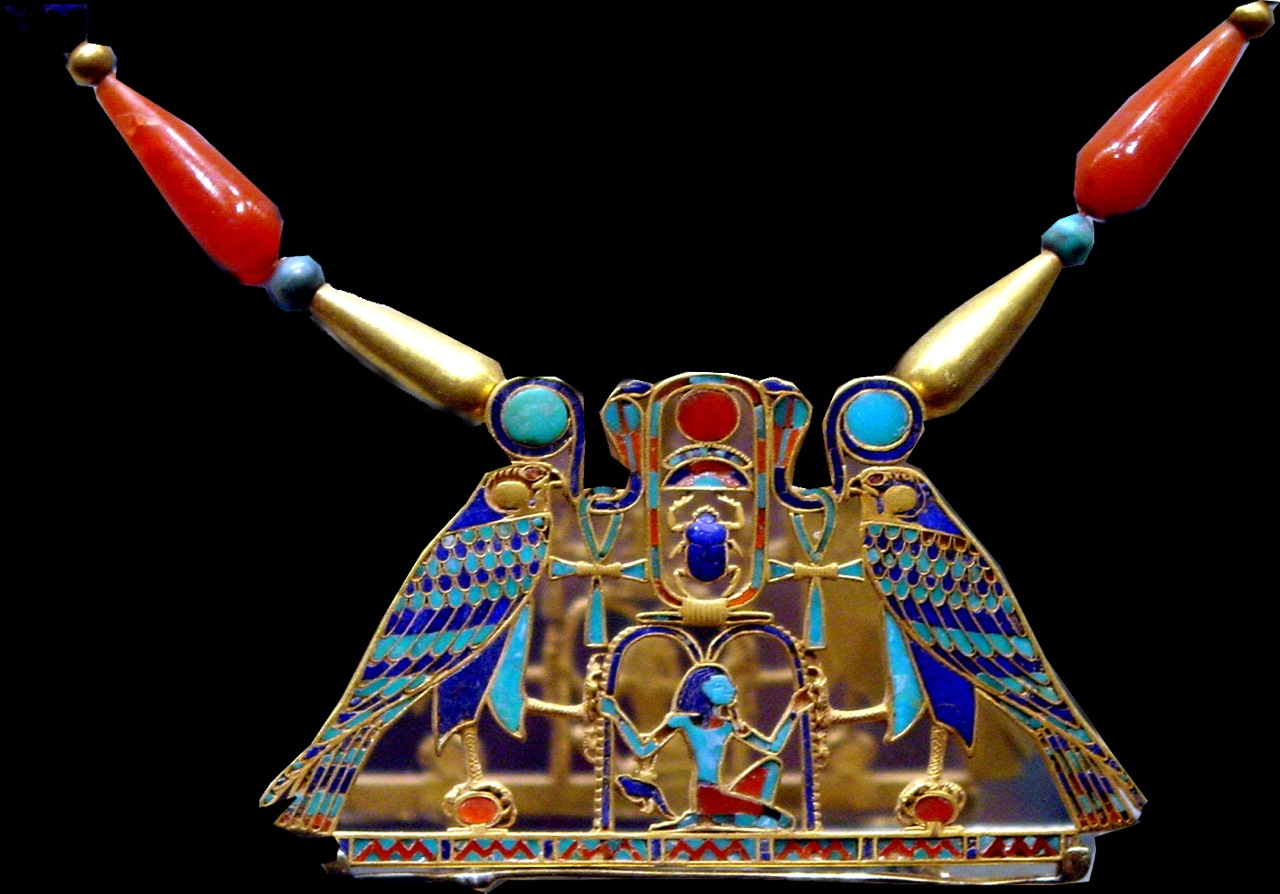
A pectoral belonging to princess Sithathoriunet, daughter of Senusret II, depicting Heh between two falcons and below Senusret II's cartouche

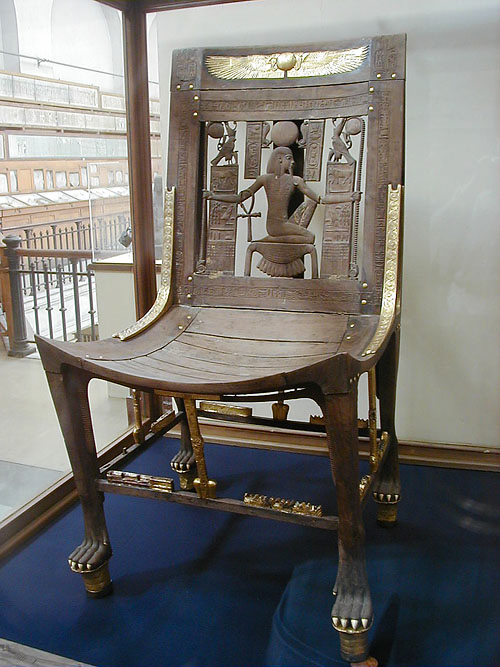
A cedar chair found in the Tomb of Tutankhamun, depicting Heh atop the hieroglyph for gold on the backrest

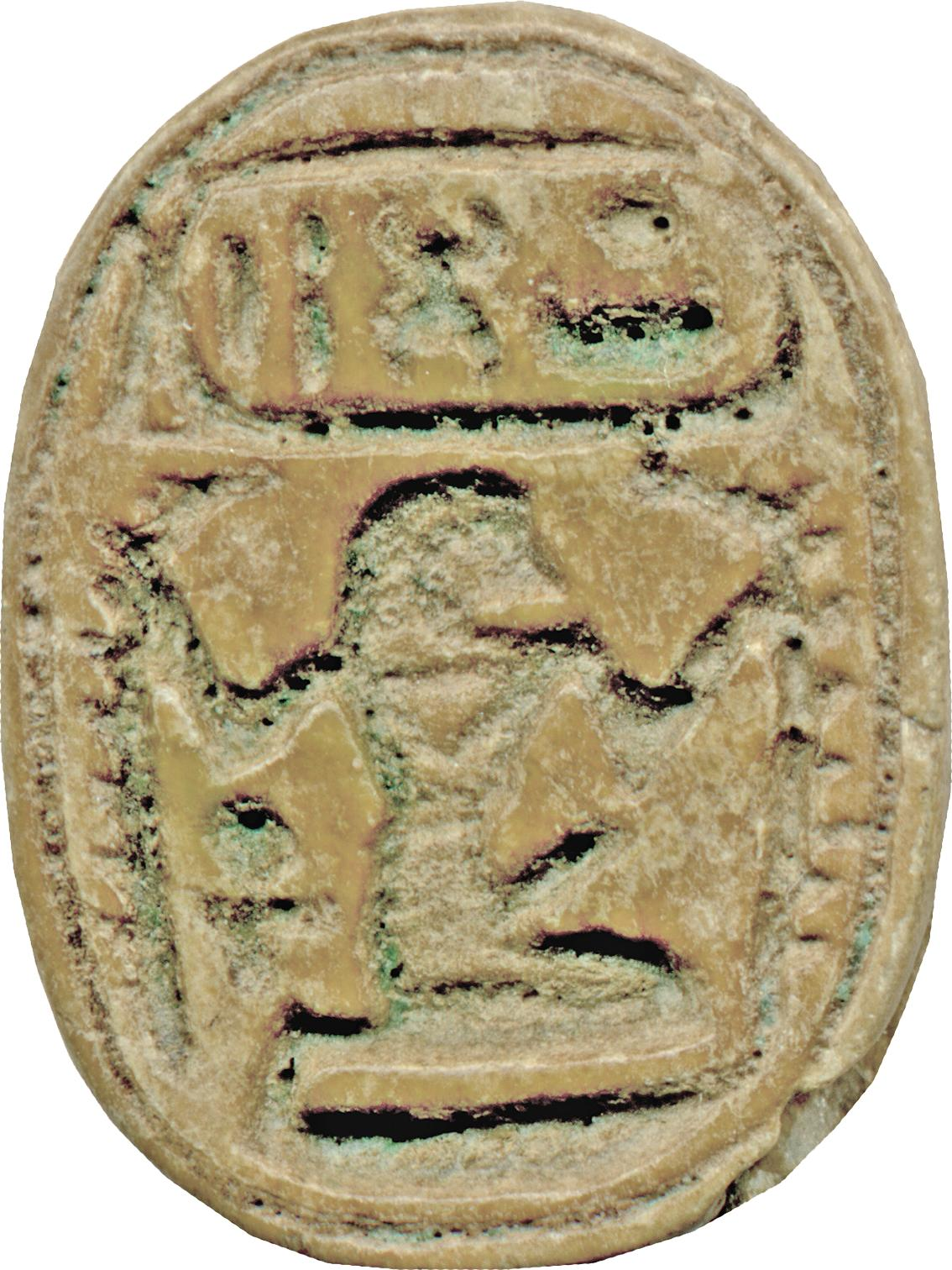
A scarab seal with the cartouche of Thutmose IV above the god Heh, c. 1397-1388 BCE

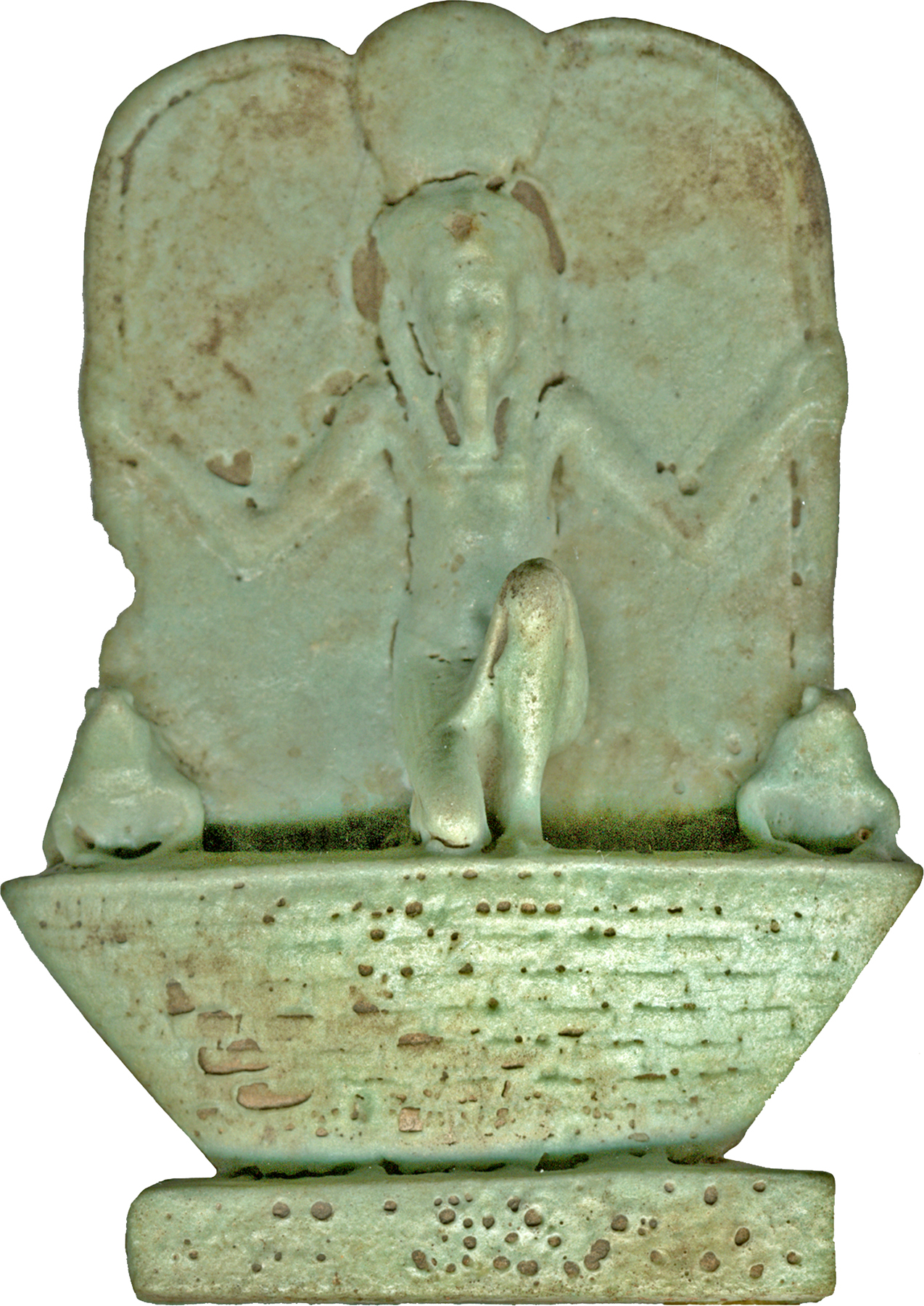
Kneeling Heh on a Basket

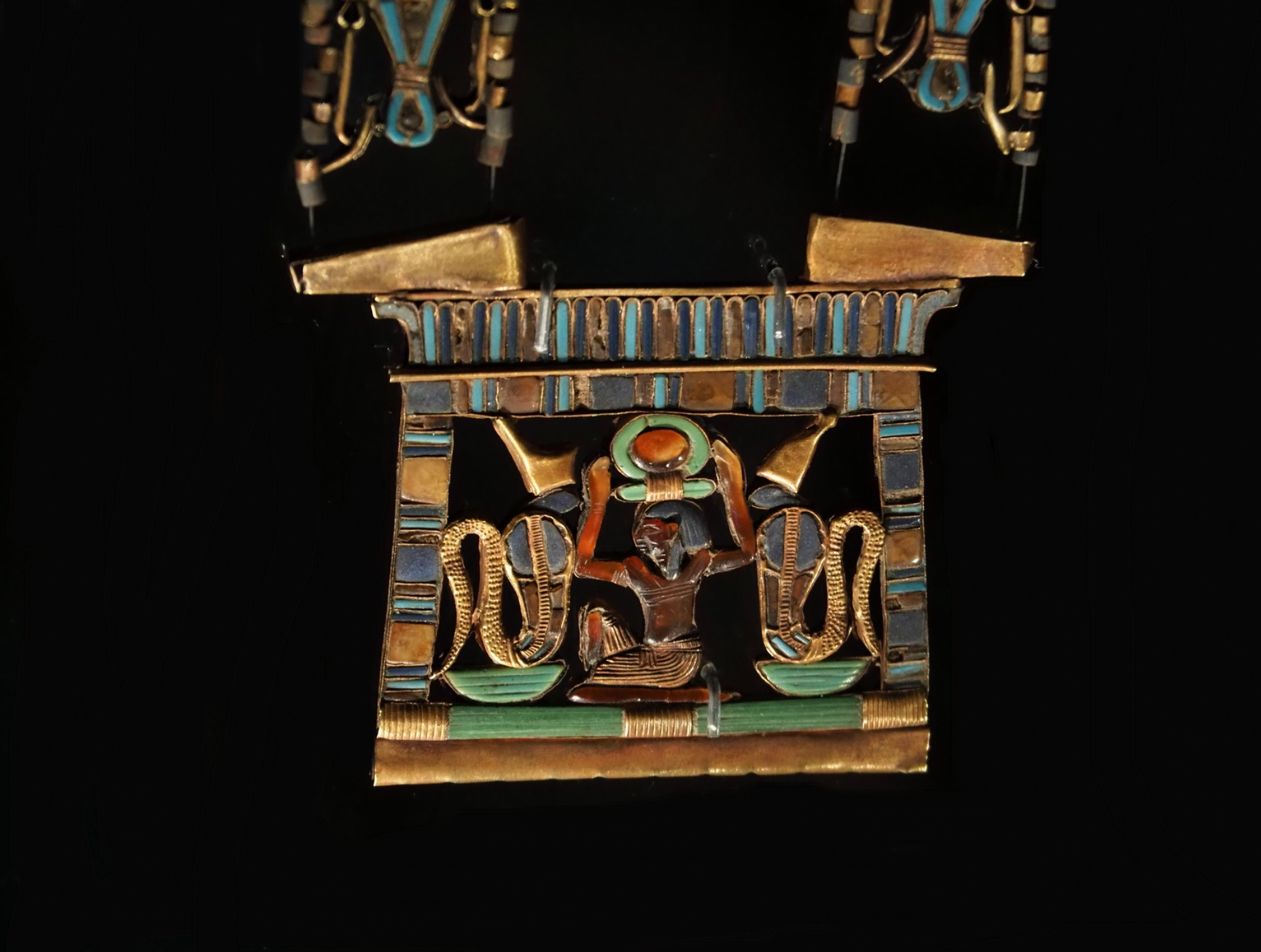
The God Heh from Tutankhamun's jewellery.

== See also ==
- Renpet

== Bibliography ==
- Barta, Winfried (1992). "Die Bedeutung der Personifikation Huh im Unterschied zu den Personifikationen Hah und Nun". Göttinger Miszellen (127): 7–12.
- Seawright, Caroline (21 May 2002). "Heh and Hauhet, Deities of Infinity and Eternity".
