= Nun (mythology) =

Ancient Egyptian personification of the primordial watery abyss

- An aspect of Heh which personifies the endless waters of chaos. Based on the papyrus of Ani and New Kingdom tomb paintings.
Name in hieroglyphs
W24 W24 W24 N1 N35A A40
- Symbol: Water
- Consort: Naunet

Naunet
- Naunet was often represented with a cobra head like other female members of the Ogdoad
Name in hieroglyphs
W24 W24 W24 N1 N35A X1 H8 B1
- Consort: Nu

Nun ("The Inert One") or Nu ("Watery One") (Ancient Egyptian: 𓏌𓐱𓏌𓐱𓏌𓐰𓇯𓈗𓀭, romanized: nnw, Ancient Egyptian pronunciation: [ˈnaːnaw]; Coptic: Ⲛⲟⲩⲛ, romanized: Noun), in ancient Egyptian religion, is the personification of the primordial watery abyss which existed at the time of creation and from which the creator sun god Ra arose.

Nun is one of the eight deities of the Ogdoad representing ancient Egyptian primordial Chaos from which the primordial mound arose. Nun can be seen as the first of all the gods and the creator of reality and personification of the cosmos. Nun is also considered the god that will destroy existence and return everything to the Nun whence it came. No cult was addressed to Nun.

Nun's consort (or his female aspect) was the goddess Nunut or Naunet (Ancient Egyptian: 𓏌𓐱𓏌𓐰𓏌𓐰𓇯𓈗𓏏𓐰𓆇𓁐, romanized: nnwt).

== Name ==
The name on Nun is paralleled with nen "inactivity" in a play of words in, "I raised them up from out of the watery mass [nu], out of inactivity [nen]". The name has also been compared to the Coptic noun "abyss; deep".

== Origin myth ==
The ancient Egyptians envisaged the oceanic abyss of the Nun as surrounding a bubble in which the sphere of life is encapsulated, representing the deepest mystery of their cosmogony. In ancient Egyptian creation accounts, the original mound of land comes forth from the waters of the Nun. The Nun is the source of all that appears in a differentiated world, from which emerge all aspects of divine and earthly existence. In the Ennead cosmogony, Nun is perceived as transcendent at the point of creation alongside Atum the creator god.

=== Creation myth ===
In the beginning the universe only consisted of a great chaotic cosmic ocean, and the ocean itself was referred to as Nun. In some versions of this myth, at the beginning of time Mehet-Weret, portrayed as a cow with a sun disk between her horns, gives birth to the sun, said to have risen from the waters of creation and to have given birth to the sun god Ra in some myths. The universe was enrapt by a vast mass of primordial waters, and the Benben, a pyramid mound, emerged amid this primal chaos. There was a lotus flower with Benben, and from this when it blossomed emerged Ra. There were many versions of the sun's emergence, and it was said to have emerged directly from the mound or from a lotus flower that grew from the mound, in the form of a heron, falcon, scarab beetle, or human child. In Heliopolis, the creation was attributed to Atum, a deity closely associated with Ra, who was said to have existed in the waters of Nun as an inert potential being.

== History ==
Beginning with the Middle Kingdom, Nun is described as "the father of the gods" and he is depicted on temple walls throughout the rest of ancient Egyptian religious history.

The Ogdoad includes along with Naunet and Nun, Amaunet and Amun; Hauhet and Heh; and Kauket and Kek. Like the other Ogdoad deities, Nu did not have temples or any center of worship. Even so, Nu was sometimes represented by a sacred lake, or, as at Abydos, by an underground stream.

== Iconography ==
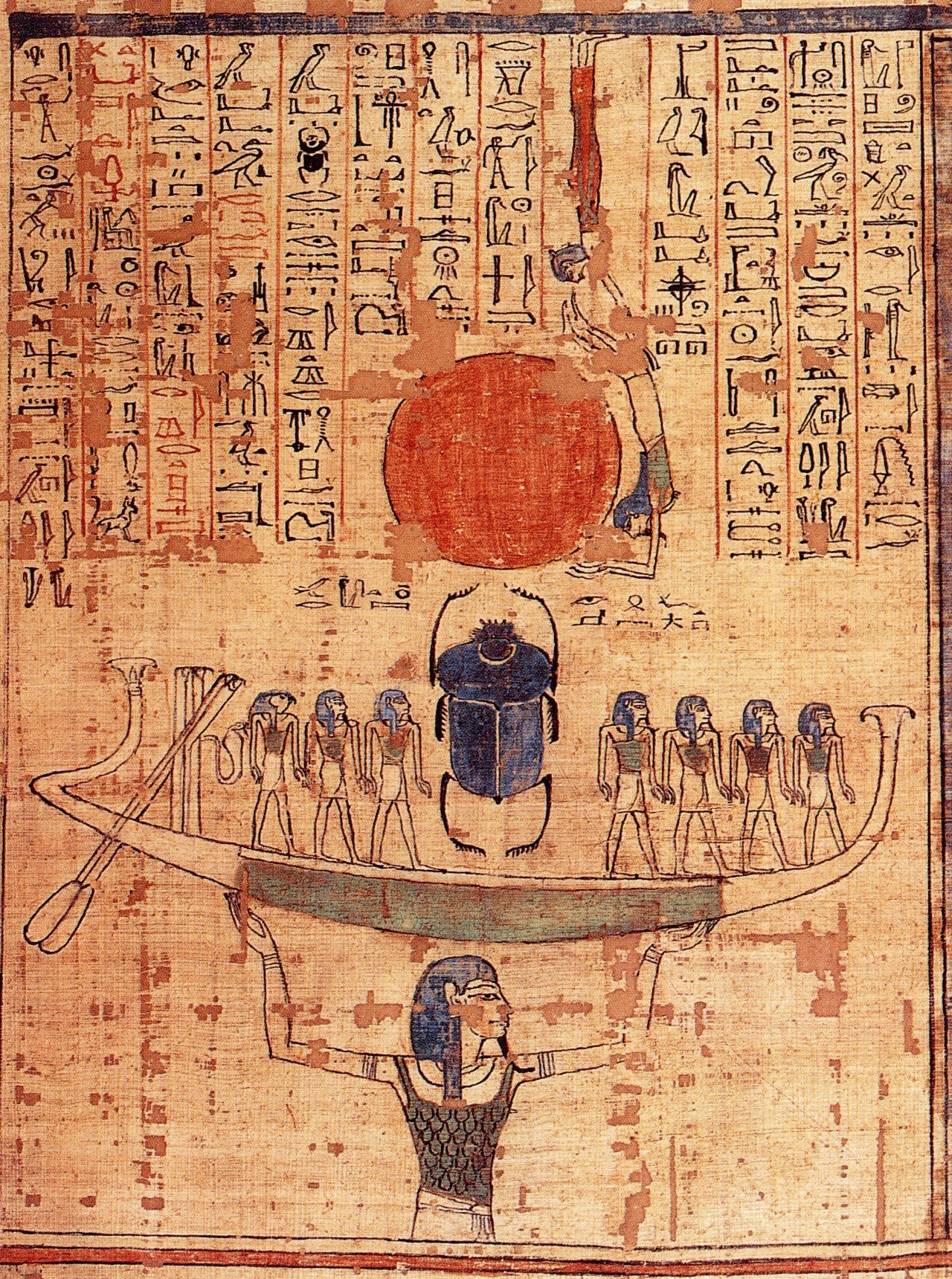
Nun lifts the solar barque with the new-born sun from the waters of creation.

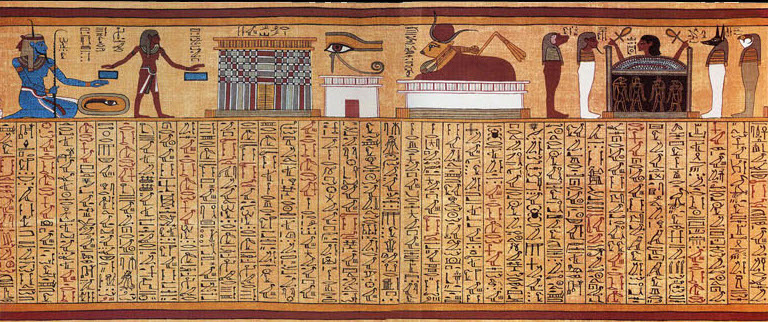
The mystical Spell 17, from the Papyrus of Ani. The vignette illustrates (left) Nu.

Nun was depicted as an anthropomorphic large figure and a personification of the primordial waters, holding a notched palm branch. Nun was also depicted in anthropomorphic form but with the head of a frog, and he was typically depicted in ancient Egyptian art holding aloft the solar barque or the sun disc. He may appear greeting the rising sun in the guise of a baboon. Nun is otherwise symbolized by the presence of a sacred cistern or lake as in the sanctuaries of Karnak and Dendara.

Nu was shown usually as male but also had aspects that could be represented as female or male. Naunet (also spelt Nunet) is the female aspect, which is the name Nu with a female gender ending. The male aspect, Nun, is written with a male gender ending. As with the primordial concepts of the Ogdoad, Nu's male aspect was depicted as a frog, or a frog-headed man. In Ancient Egyptian art, Nun also appears as a bearded man, with blue-green skin, representing water. Naunet is represented as a snake or snake-headed woman.

In the 12th Hour of the Book of Gates, Nu is depicted with upraised arms holding a solar bark (or barque, a boat). The boat is occupied by eight deities with Khepri, Ra's morning aspect, standing in the middle and being surrounded by the seven other deities.

During the Late Period when Egypt was occupied by foreign powers, the negative aspect of Nun (ie. chaos) became the dominant perception, reflecting the forces of disorder that were set loose in the country.

== See also ==
- Abzu – Primeval sea in Mesopotamian mythology
- Chaos – Void state preceding creation
- Cosmic ocean – Mythological motif
- Firmament – Solid dome dividing the primal waters
- Hapi – Ancient Egyptian god of the annual flooding of the Nile
- Sea of Suf – Primordial sea in Mandaean cosmology
- Tehom – Primordial waters of creation in the Bible
- Vishnu – Major deity in Hinduism
- Wadj-wer – Ancient Egyptian god of fertility
- Wuji – The primordial in Chinese philosophy
