= West =

One of the four cardinal directions

A 16-point compass rose with west highlighted in black

West is one of the four cardinal directions or points of the compass. It is the opposite direction from east and is the direction in which the Sun sets on the Earth.

== Etymology ==
The word "west" is a Germanic word passed into some Romance languages (ouest in French, oest in Catalan, ovest in Italian, vest in Romanian, oeste in Spanish and Portuguese). As in other languages, the word formation stems from the fact that west is the direction of the setting sun in the evening: 'west' derives from the Indo-European root *wes reduced from *wes-pero 'evening, night', cognate with Ancient Greek ἕσπερος hesperos 'evening; evening star; western' and Latin vesper 'evening; west'. Examples of the same formation in other languages include Latin occidens 'west' from occidō 'to go down, to set' and Hebrew מַעֲרָב (maarav) 'west' from עֶרֶב (erev) 'evening'.

West is sometimes abbreviated as W.

== Navigation ==
To go west using a compass for navigation (in a place where magnetic north is the same direction as true north) one needs to set a bearing or azimuth of 270°.

West is the direction opposite that of the Earth's rotation on its axis, and is therefore the general direction towards which the Sun appears to constantly progress and eventually set. This is not true on the planet Venus, which rotates in the opposite direction from the Earth (retrograde rotation). To an observer on the surface of Venus, the Sun would rise in the west and set in the east although Venus's opaque clouds prevent observing the Sun from the planet's surface.

In a map with north at the top, west is on the left.

Moving continuously west is following a circle of latitude.

== Weather ==
Due to the direction of the Earth's rotation, the prevailing wind in many places in the middle latitudes (i.e. between 35 and 65 degrees latitude) is from the west, known as the westerlies.

== Cultural ==
The phrase "the West" is often spoken in reference to the Western world, which includes the European Union (also the EFTA countries), the United Kingdom, the Americas, Israel, Australia, New Zealand and (in part) South Africa.

The concept of the Western part of the earth has its roots in the Western Roman Empire and the Western Christianity. During the Cold War "the West" was often used to refer to the NATO camp as opposed to the Warsaw Pact and non-aligned nations. The expression survives, with an increasingly ambiguous meaning.

== Symbolic meanings ==
In Chinese Buddhism, the West represents movement toward the Buddha or enlightenment (see Journey to the West). The ancient Aztecs believed that the West was the realm of the great goddess of water, mist, and maize. In Ancient Egypt, the West was considered to be the portal to the netherworld, and is the cardinal direction regarded in connection with death, though not always with a negative connotation. Ancient Egyptians also believed that the Goddess Amunet was a personification of the West. The Celts believed that beyond the western sea off the edges of all maps lay the Otherworld, or Afterlife.

In Judaism, west is seen to be toward the Shekinah (presence) of God, as in Jewish history the Tabernacle and subsequent Jerusalem Temple faced east, with God's Presence in the Holy of Holies up the steps to the west. According to the Bible, the Israelites crossed the Jordan River westward into the Promised Land.

In Islam, cardinal directions carry spiritual significance, but the emphasis is often on the omnipresence of God rather than symbolic geography. The West, like all directions, is encompassed by the divine presence. The Qur'an states: "To God belong the East and the West. Wheresoever you turn, there is the Face of God. God is All-Encompassing, All-Knowing." (2:115). This verse underscores the idea that spiritual truth transcends direction, offering a contrast to traditions that attach specific symbolic meanings to the West.

In American literature (e.g., in The Great Gatsby) moving West has sometimes symbolized gaining freedom, perhaps as an association with the settling of the Wild West (see also the American frontier and Manifest Destiny).
