= Sea of Suf =

Primordial sea in Mandaean cosmology

In Mandaean cosmology, the Sea of Suf (or Sea of Sup, Classical Mandaic: ࡉࡀࡌࡀ ࡖࡎࡅࡐ, romanized: iama ḏ-sup, lit. 'Sea of the End') is a primordial sea in the World of Darkness. It is analogous to Tehom in the Book of Genesis. It is a great sea that the soul has to pass in the first steps of ascending, and is also considered to be the limit of worldly desire.

== In the Ginza Rabba ==
The Sea of Suf is mentioned in Right Ginza 1, 2.3, 3, 5.2, 9.1, 15.1, 15.10, 15.12, 15.18, 16.1, 16.6, and Left Ginza 2.14, often as iama rba ḏ-sup or the "Great Suf-Sea."

== See also ==
- Abzu – Primeval sea in Mesopotamian mythology
- Cosmic ocean – Mythological motif
- Firmament – Solid dome dividing the primal waters
- Nu – Ancient Egyptian personification of the primordial watery abyss
- Tohu wa-bohu – In the Genesis creation narrative, the earth's condition immediately before light's creation
- Tiamat – Primordial goddess of ancient Babylon religion
- Yam Suph – Body of water in the Book of Exodus (Hebrew cognate)
