= Wadj-wer =

Ancient Egyptian god of fertility

- Wadj-wer based on a relief in the mortuary temple of Sahure
Name in hieroglyphs
M14 wr mw
wꜣḏ-wr

Wadj-wer, also spelled Uatch-ur is an Egyptian god of fertility and the personification of the Mediterranean Sea, whose name means the "great green". He also symbolizes the richness of the waters of the Nile Delta.

It was commonly believed that Wadj-wer was a personification of the Mediterranean Sea; however, he also rather represented the lagoons and lakes in the northernmost Nile Delta, as suggested by some texts describing the "great green" as dry lands which could be crossed by foot, possibly a mention of pathways between two or more lakes.

The earliest known attestation of Wadj-wer is dated back to the 5th Dynasty, in the mortuary temple of the pyramid of Sahure, at Abusir; here he appears similar to the god Hapi, but with his body filled by water ripples.

== See also ==
- Nu (mythology)
- List of water deities
