= Sea (astronomy) =

Part of the sky associated with water-based mythology

The Sea or the Water is an area of the sky in which many water-related, and few land-related, constellations occur. This may be because the Sun passed through this part of the sky during the rainy season.

Most of these constellations are named by Ptolemy:

- Aquarius the Water-bearer
- Capricornus the Sea-goat
- Cetus the Whale
- Delphinus the Dolphin
- Eridanus the Great River
- Hydra the Water serpent
- Pisces the Fishes
- Piscis Austrinus, the Southern Fish (not named by Ptolemy)

Sometimes included are the ship Argo and Crater the Water Cup.

Some water-themed constellations are newer, so are not in this region. They include Hydrus, the lesser water snake; Volans, the flying fish; and Dorado, the swordfish.

== See also ==
- Celestial ocean, a mythological concept, not specific to astronomy
- Lunar sea
