= Ogdoad (Egyptian) =

Group of 8 deities in Ancient Egyptian religion

Nu, Naunet, Heh, Heuhet, Kek, Kauket, Amun, and Amunet
- A depiction of the Ogdoad based on a Roman era relief at the Hathor temple in Dendera
Name in hieroglyphs
Z1 Z1 Z1 Z1 Z1 Z1 Z1 Z1 i i w A40 Z3 (see individual names)
- Major cult center: Hermopolis

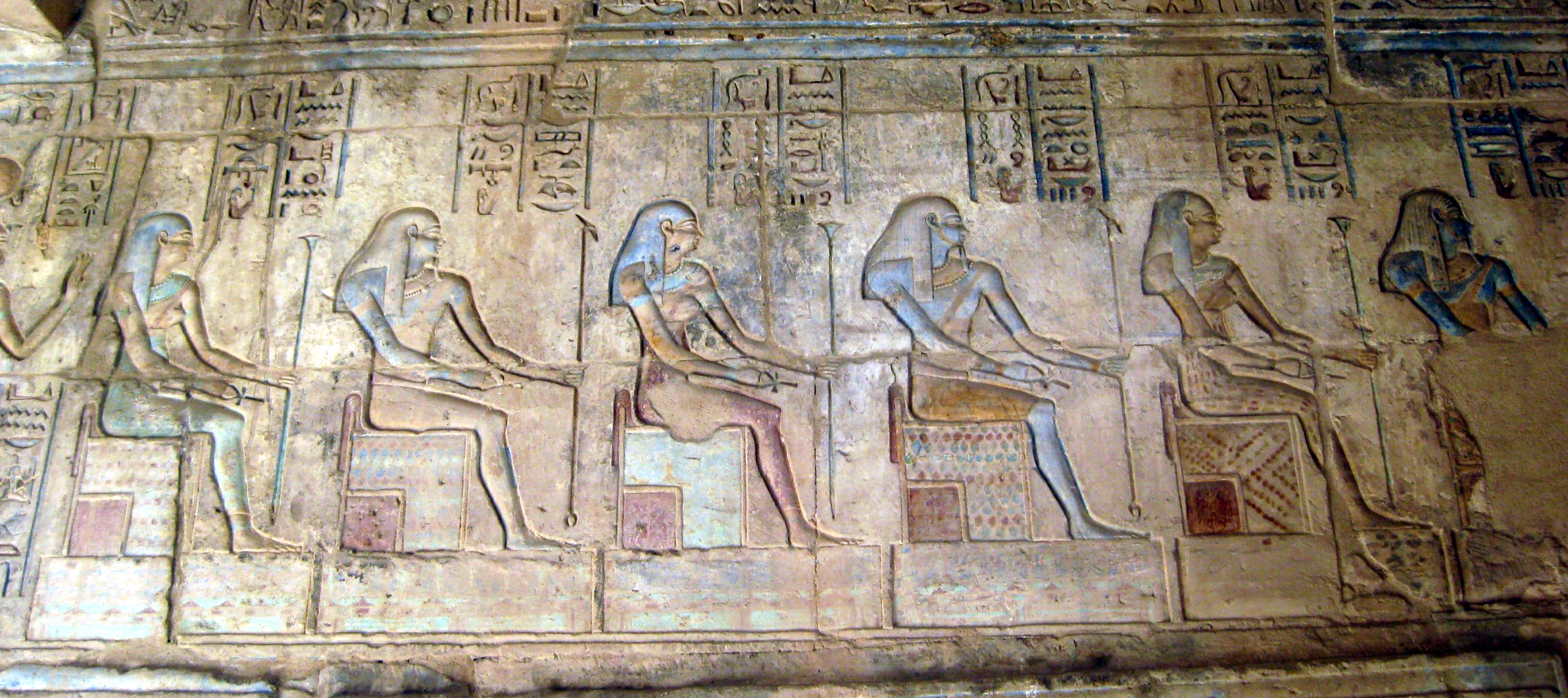
The Ogdoad with both their male and female consorts

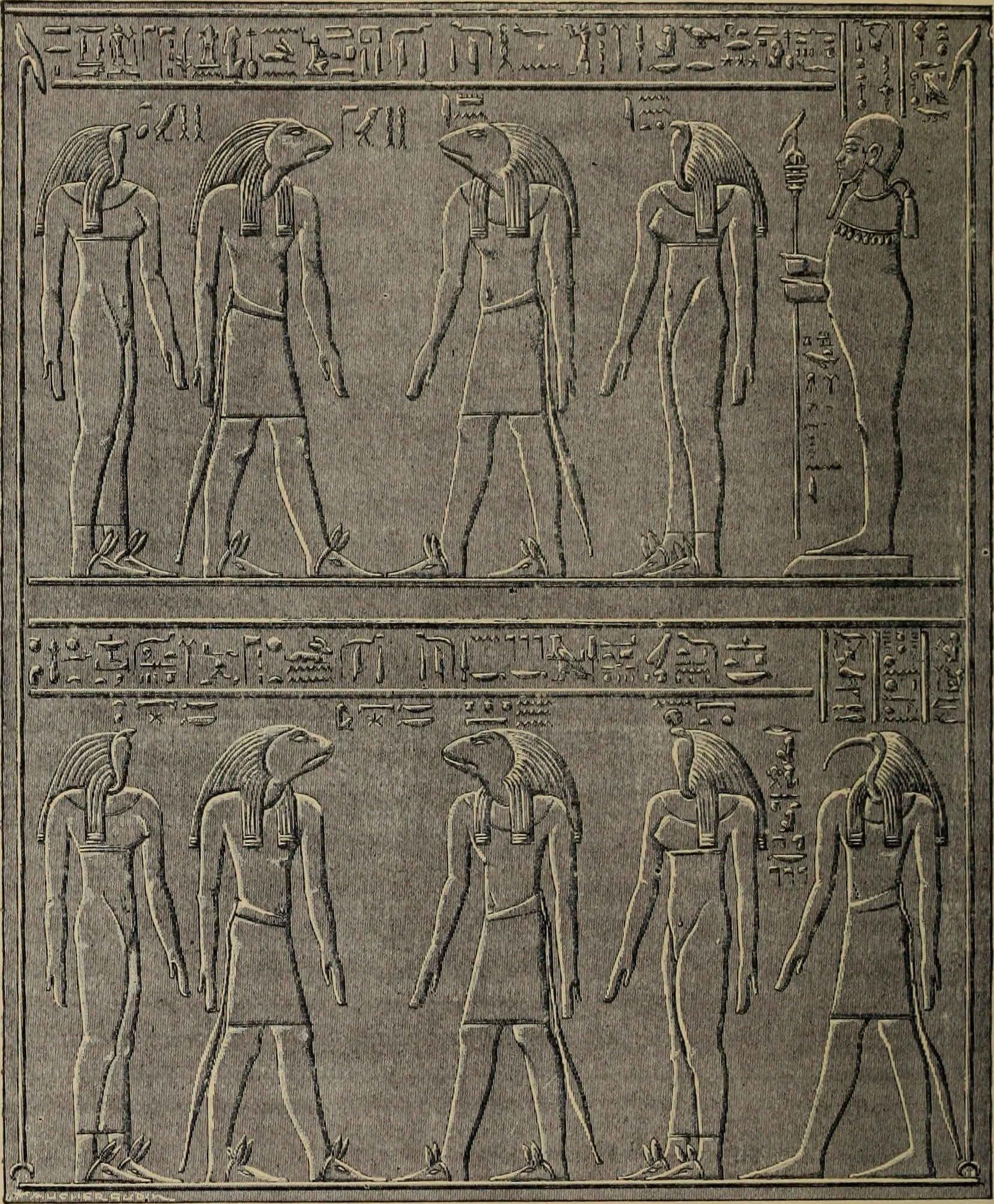
Drawing of a representation of the Ogdoad in the temple of Philae

In Egyptian mythology, the Ogdoad (Ancient Greek: ὀγδοάς "the Eightfold"; Ancient Egyptian: ḫmnyw, a plural nisba of ḫmnw "eight") were eight primordial deities worshiped in Hermopolis.

The earliest certain reference to the Ogdoad is from the Eighteenth Dynasty, in a dedicatory inscription by Hatshepsut at the Speos Artemidos.

Texts of the Late Period describe them as having the heads of frogs (male) and serpents (female), and they are often depicted in this way in reliefs of the last dynasty, the Ptolemaic Kingdom.

== Names ==
The eight deities were arranged in four male–female pairs. The names of each pair have the same meanings and differ only slightly, with the difference being the appending of symbols indicating 'female'.

Nu W24 W24 W24 N1 N35A A40	Naunet W24 W24 W24 N1 N35A X1 H8 B1
Ḥeḥ V28 V28 G43 A40	Ḥeuḥet V28 V28 G43 X1 H8 B1
Kek V31 V31 y G43 N2 A40	Kauket V31 V31 y G43 N2 X1 H8 B1
Amun i mn n C12	Amunet i mn n t H8 I12

== Attributes ==
Kek and other male members

Kauket and other female members

Nu

Ḥeḥ

Amun

Amunet

The names of Nu and Naunet are written with the determiners for sky and water, and it seems clear that they represent the primordial waters.

Ḥeḥ and Ḥeuḥet have no readily identifiable determiners; according to a suggestion due to Brugsch (1885), the names are associated with a term for an undefined or unlimited number, ḥeḥ, suggesting a concept similar to the Greek aion. From the context of a number of passages in which Ḥeḥu is mentioned, however, Brugsch also suggested that the names may be a personification of the atmosphere between heaven and earth (c.f. Shu).

The names of Kek and Kauket are written with a determiner combining the sky hieroglyph with a staff or scepter used for words related to darkness and obscurity, and kkw as a regular word means "darkness", suggesting that these gods represent primordial darkness, comparable to the Greek Erebus, but in some aspects they appear to represent day as well as night, or the change from night to day and from day to night.

The original fourth pair Amun and Amunet written with "imn", which stood for "Invisibility" or "Hidden" as a representation of the concealed potential of the primordial waters. However, as Amun's patron city Thebes influence grew and his role was gradually elevated to that of the King of the Gods, he and Amaunet would frequently be substituted for other pairs or given alternate names. Such examples would include

- Tenem and Tenemet, occasionally translated as "Gloom", but given the root word tnm is defined as 'to become lost' or 'to go astray', suggests the principle of "Nowhere".
- Qerh (or Gereh) and Qerhet (or Gerhet), the common meaning of qerḥ is "night", but the determinative grh (D41 for "to halt, stop, deny") also suggests the principle of the inactivity or repose.
- Niau and Niaut, "Emptiness", "Negation" or "Void"
- Ni / Nenu / Nu and Ennit / Nenuit / Nunu / Nit

There is no obvious way to allot or attribute four functions to the four pairs of deities; Budge postulates that "the ancient Egyptians themselves had no very clear idea" regarding such functions. Nevertheless, there have been attempts to assign "four ontological concepts" to the four pairs: For example, in the context of the New Kingdom, Karenga (2004) uses "fluidity" (for "flood, waters"), "darkness", "unboundedness", and "invisibility" (or "repose, inactivity").

== See also ==
- Ennead
