= Kek (mythology) =

Ancient Egyptian personification of primordial darkness

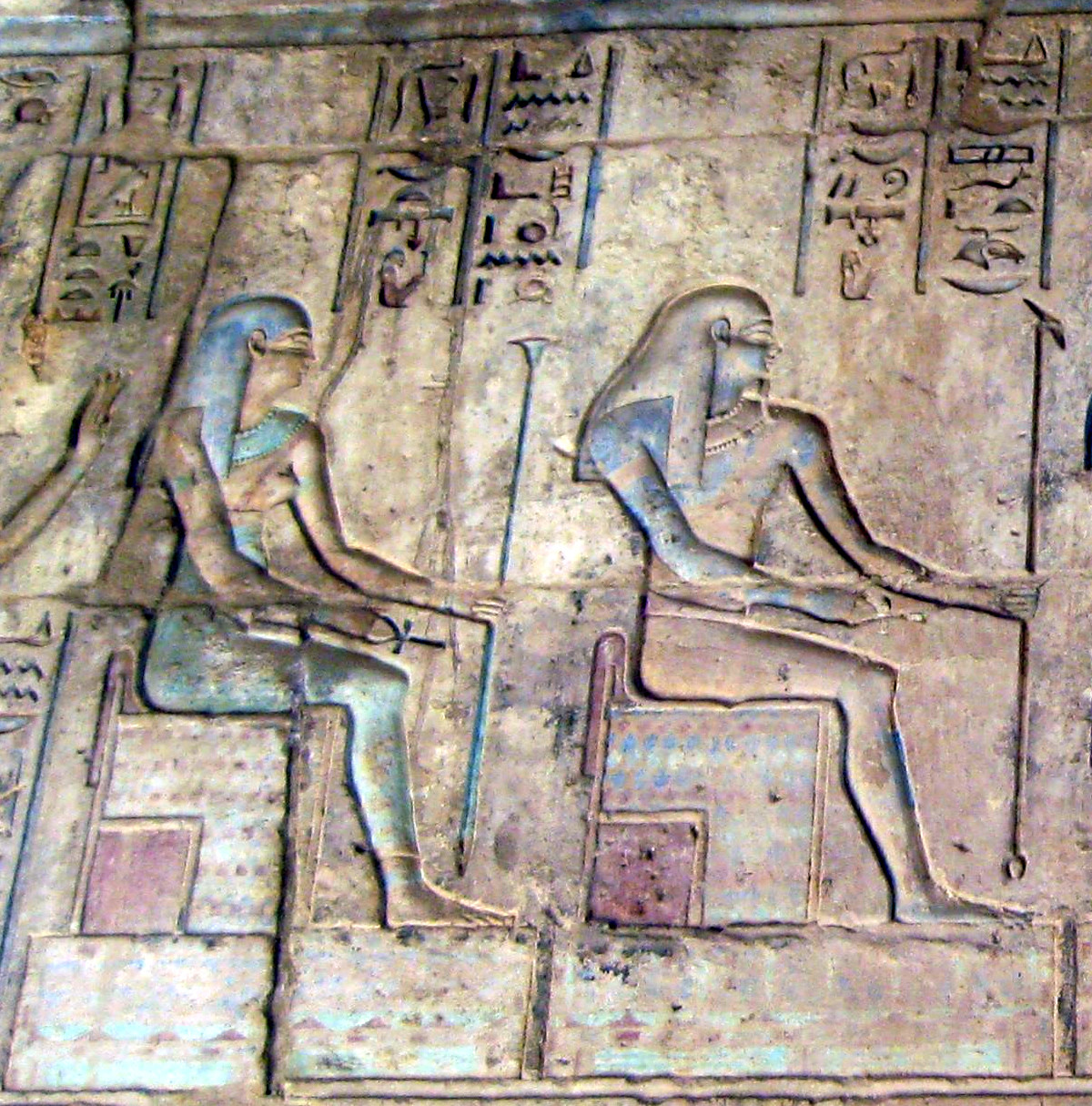
- Kauket (left) and Kek (right) sitting on thrones, relief from a temple at Deir el-Medina
Name in hieroglyphs
V31 V31 N2
Kek
V31 V31 y G43 N2 A40
Kekuit
V31 V31 N2 B1
- Major cult center: Hermopolis (as a member of the Ogdoad)

Genealogy
- Spouse: Kauket

Kauket
- Kauket was often represented with a cobra head like other female members of the Ogdoad
Name in hieroglyphs
V31 V31 y G43 N2 X1 H8 B1
- Major cult center: Hermopolis (as a member of the Ogdoad)

Genealogy
- Spouse: Kek

Kek is the deification of the concept of primordial darkness in the ancient Egyptian Ogdoad cosmogony of Hermopolis.

The Ogdoad consisted of four pairs of deities, four male gods paired with their female counterparts. Kek's female counterpart was Kauket. Kek and Kauket in some aspects also represent night and day, and were called "raiser up of the light" and the "raiser up of the night", respectively.

The name is written as kk or kkwy with a variant of the sky hieroglyph in ligature with the staff (N2) associated with the word for "darkness" kkw.

== History ==
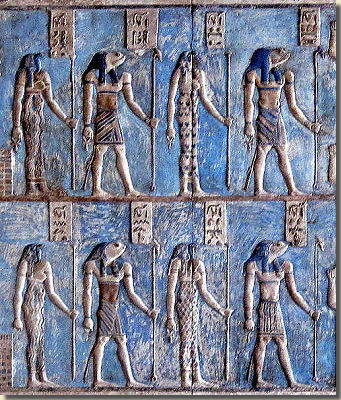
Kek and Kauket (bottom right) depicted in a painted relief from Dendera.

In the oldest representations, Kauket is given the head of a serpent, and Kek the head of either a frog or a cat. In one scene, they are identified with Ka and Kait; in this scene, Ka-Kekui has the head of a frog surmounted by a beetle and Kait-Kekuit has the head of a serpent surmounted by a disk.

In the Greco-Roman period, Kek's male form was depicted as a frog-headed man, and the female form as a serpent-headed woman, as were all four dualistic concepts in the Ogdoad.

== In popular culture ==
Individuals associated with online message boards, such as 4chan, noted a similarity between Kek and the character Pepe the Frog, images of whom were often used alongside the acronym 'KEK' (a variant of LOL). This was later paired with images of Pepe, resulting in a resurgence of interest in the ancient deity.

Elon Musk has made numerous references to Pepe and even to Kek, among others within the perceived right wing movement such as Donald Trump, who tweeted himself as a version of the frog. Believers have cited this as evidence of memetic synchronicity.

== See also ==
- Heqet
- Erebus
