= Amunet =

Ancient Egyptian primordial goddess

- Amunet wearing the red crown; a modern drawing based on depictions from antiquity
Name in hieroglyphs
i mn n t
or
i mn n t H8 I12
- Major cult center: Thebes; Hermopolis (as a member of the Ogdoad)
- Consort: Amun

Amunet (/ˈæməˌnɛt/) or Imnt (The Hidden One in hieroglyphs; also spelled Amonet or Amaunet; Koine Greek: Αμαυνι) is a primordial goddess in ancient Egyptian religion. Thebes was the center of her worship through the last dynasty, the Ptolemaic Kingdom, in 30 BCE. She is attested in the earliest known of Egyptian religious texts and, as was the custom, was paired with a counterpart who is entitled with the same name, but in the masculine, Amun. They were thought to have existed prior to the beginning of creation along with three other couples representing primeval concepts.

== Description and history ==
=== Primeval counterparts ===
The goddess originated as a female doublet of the god Amun. Female doublets are distinguished from their male counterparts mainly by the feminine ending of their name. They did not receive a cult worship of their own until the late period. The most famous Female doublets are the four pairs of the Ogdoad of which Amunet was originally a part. Her name, jmnt, is a feminine noun that means "The Hidden One". As a member of the Ogdoad of Hermopolis, she represented aspects of the primeval existence before the creation: Amunet was paired with Amun—whose name also means "The Hidden One", with a masculine ending (jmn)—within this divine group, from the earliest known documentation. Such pairing of deities is characteristic of the religious concepts of the ancient Egyptians. In early concepts known as the Ogdoad, the primeval deity group to which they belonged as "Night" (or as the determinative D41 meaning "to halt, stop, deny", suggesting the principle of inactivity or repose), was composed of four balanced couples of deities or deified primeval concepts.

The Pyramid Texts, the earliest known religious texts of Ancient Egypt, mention "the beneficent shadow of Amun and Amunet":

O Amun and Amunet! You pair of the gods, who joined the gods with their shadow.

— PT 446c

The German Egyptologist Kurt Sethe suggests that the names Amun and Amunet were originally used as epithets for the twin pair Shu and Tefnut, who, in the Heliopolitan tradition, were the first children of the creator god Atum. Sethe further proposed that the eight primeval gods were established in the early religion of Memphis as the manifestations of the creator-god Ptah. The theology of Memphis placed Ptah on the top of the creation chain by making him the embodiement of the primordial waters from which Atum was born. Originally, Amunet was intended as the consort of Amun, just as the other female members of the Ogdoad formed pairs with their male counterparts. The cosmogonic text Theb. T. 283b describes the emergence of the female members of the Ogdoad with the following words: "The Eight came into being there (in Thebes), consisting of their four men and one woman for each."

The move of the cult of Amun and Amunet from Hermopolis to Thebes likely occurred no earlier than in the 11th Dynasty. The earliest records of Theban worship of Amun appear during the reign of King Intef the Great, who expanded Theban control northward, seizing Abydos and pushing the frontier to the 10th nome.At that time, Hermopolis, the home of the Ogdoad and Amunet as one of its members, belonged to the kings of the 10th dynasty who ruled from Heracleopolis Magna. The establishment of a distinct cult for Amun and Amunet in Thebes may have been a strategic move by the Thebans to undermine their rivals by appropriating a deity of significant importance to them.It is possible that a Theban king established a new sanctuary for Amun in Thebes to claim the god's support and strengthen his rule. Amun's role as an oracle deity may have also positioned Thebes as a competing religious center against Hermopolis

=== Cult becomes localized ===
By at least the Twelfth Dynasty of Egypt (c. 1991–1803 BC), Amunet often was superseded by Mut as Amun's partner, as cults evolved or similar ones in other regions were merged following Mentuhotep II's reunification of Egypt—but Amunet remained locally important in Thebes, where Amun was worshipped. In that capitol of the unified country she was seen as a protector of the king, playing a preeminent role in rituals associated with the royal coronation (khaj-nisut) and Sed festivals (heb-sed) celebrating its well-celebrated anniversaries, and priests were dedicated to Amunet's service at Karnak, Amun's cult center. In contrast to Mut, Amunet has been described as a merely a feminine abstraction of Amun, parallel to the other female-male pairs of the Ogdoad which she originally belonged to. Unlike the other female members of the Ogdoad, her cult grew in the Later period and a number of priests of Amunet are known from hieroglyphic and demonis sources. During festivals she was represented by her own divine bark and a Roman Period Papyrus even mentions an edifice within Karnak called the open court of Amunet as an important stop in the Khoiak festival. She held titles such as "Amunet the very great, lady of the two lands within Karnak", and "Ruler in Thebes", and is the only goddess mentioned within the Karnak temple complex in the Ramesside "Litany of Victorious Thebes", as well as being the only one listed with Amun together as the principal deities of the Theban nome in a Late period Manual. This connection distinguishes her from the goddess Mut who in only associated with the Mut complex and the Isheru lake of the Mut Temple within the larger karnak temple complex

Amunet appears most frequently alongside ithyphallic forms of Amun such as Amenope or Amun-Min-kamutef and never appears in temple scenes together with Khonsu or any other child gods. Thus while Amun, Mut and Khonsu form the classic Theban triad, Amunet only accompanies Amun. In the Festival Hall of Thutmose III (c. 1479–1425 BC), Amunet is shown with the fertility god Min while leading a row of deities to visit the king in the anniversary celebration. Amunet is mythologically regarded as the mother-wife of Amun-Min, which is also indicated by his title "bull of his mother". Inscriptions from Karnak describe the goddess as "the mother together with the father in the beginning" and as the embodiment of the primordial Lotus which gave birth to the sun god. Amunet is also less frequently referred to as Amun's daughter or sister-wife in Karnak.

In spite of Amunet's stable position as a local goddess of Egypt's most important city, her cult began to have very little following outside the Theban region that developed into a dominant religious center for the unified country.

Amunet was depicted as a woman wearing the Deshret "Red Crown of Lower Egypt" and carrying a staff of papyrus—as in her colossal statue placed during the reign of Tutankhamun (c. 1332–1323 BC) into the Record Hall of Thutmose III at Karnak. The reason for this iconography is uncertain. At that time, the cult of Amun was being restored after being displaced by worship of Aten during the reign of Akhenaten.

The Graeco-Roman texts emphasize the Ogdoad cosmogony, where Amun (the bull) and Amunet (the cow) are primordial creators, preceding and forming the Ogdoad, which consists of four bulls (Montus) and four cows (Raettawys). Amun and Amunet's union symbolizes the creation of the sun, a key cosmogonic event. This is reflected in Amenope's epithet, "eldest of the primeval ones", and Amunet's designation as "the Great Cow that gave birth to Ra". The goddess Raet is a female doublet of the sun god Ra, with whom both Montu and Amun were associated. In the Leiden Papyrus, Amun is described as "the one who appeared as Ra from the one who created what is and what is not, the father of fathers, the mother of mothers, the bull of those four young women of the first time". Amun here embodies the four male aspects of the Ogdoad, which at the same time also embody Ra and Montu, who are supposed to unite with the four goddesses. In a demotic papyrus by Abusir el Meleq (Berl. Pap. 13603), Ptah-Tatennen, who is regarded here as a god superior to the Ogdoad, commands that the eight gods should unite and pour their seed into the great lake of Hermopolis, whereupon the first sun god emerges from this union.

In one of the Theban creation myths described in the Song of the Primal Gods, Amun hatched for the first time from an invisible egg at the Lake of the Two Knives (a mythological place that the sun god passes every day) on the Primal Hill in Hermopolis with Amunet as his companion.

During the New kingdom period (since the 26th dynasty) Amun and Amaunet appear only outside of Thebes as members of the ogdoad while Theban traditions place them a generation above the Ogdoad and replace them with the twin pair Niau and Niaut. On some of Ptolemy Euergetes's monuments at Thebes, on which the new pair of Niau and Niaut complete the number eight of the primordial gods, Amun and Amunet are equated with the pair of gods Nun and Naunet and are seen as the parents of the sun god Atum.

Although she remained a distinct deity as late as the Ptolemaic Kingdom (323–30 BC), in some late texts from Karnak Amunet was syncretized with Neith and she was carved suckling pharaoh Philip III of Macedon (323–317 BC) who appears as a divine child immediately after his own enthronement, onto an exterior wall of the eighteenth dynasty Festival Hall of Thutmose III at Karnak. Just like Neith, Amunet is called the "great cow who birthed Ra", "mother of Ra", "mother of light" and "mother of god".

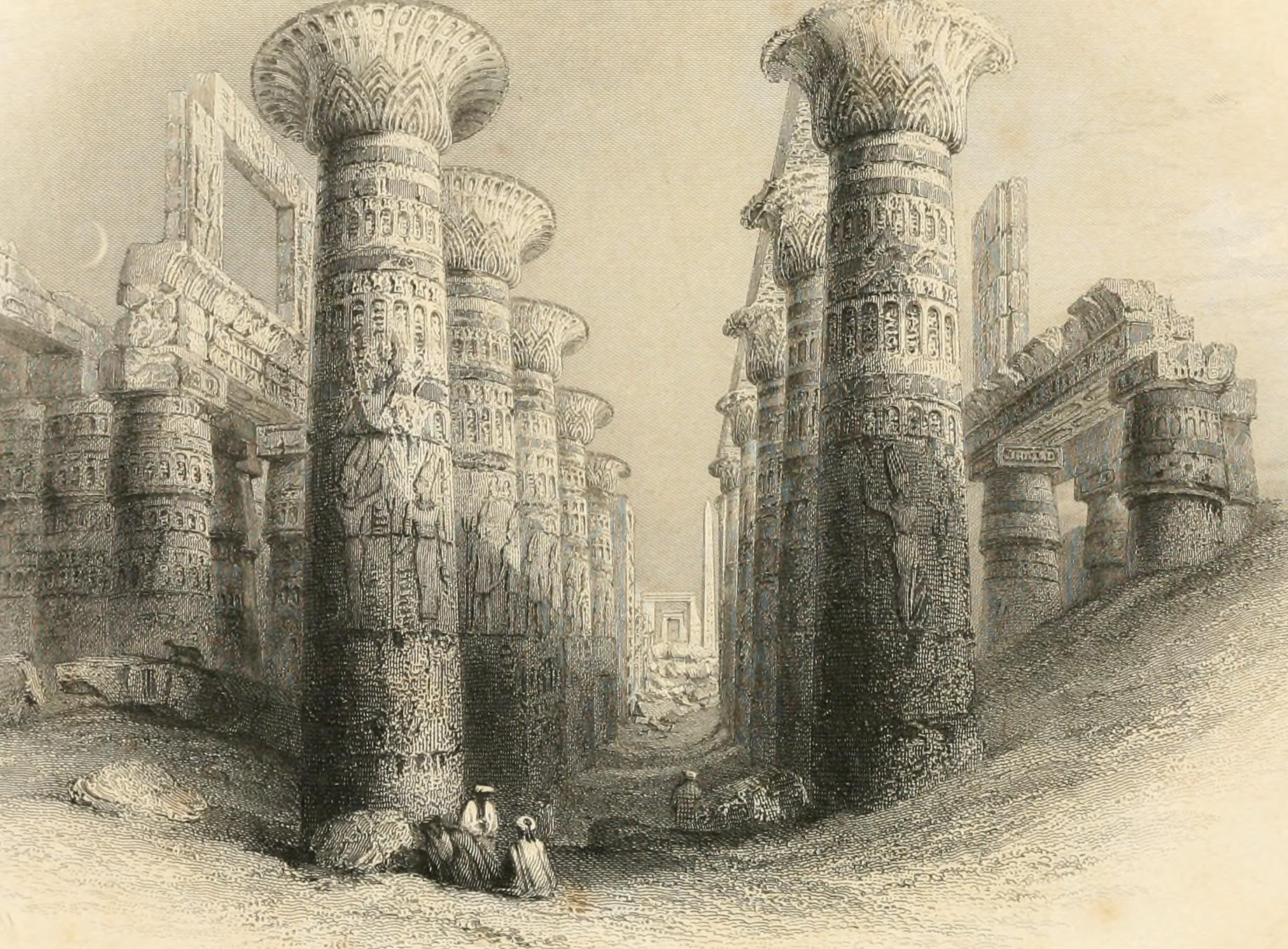
The most important cult center for Amunet
was the Temple of Amun at Karnak

== Gallery ==
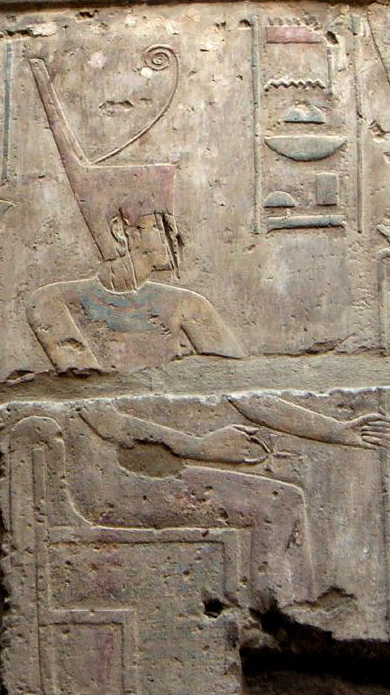
Bas relief of Amunet in Luxor wearing the Deshret crown

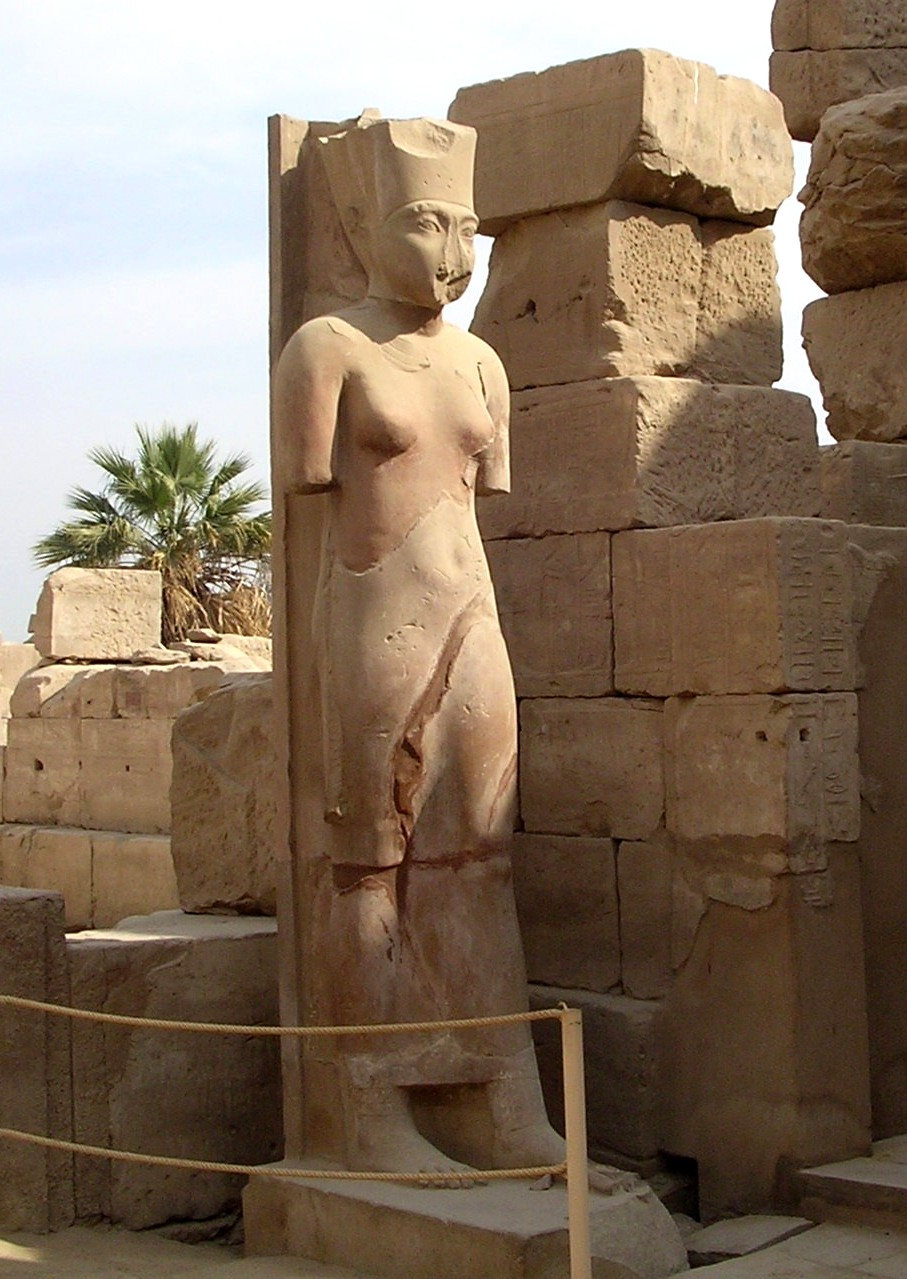
Colossal statue of Amunet, with features of Ankhesenamun, erected by Tutankhamun in Karnak

== Bibliography ==
- Hart, George (1986). A Dictionary of Egyptian Gods and Goddesses. Routledge. ISBN 0-415-05909-7.
- Wilkinson, Richard H. (2003). The Complete Gods and Goddesses of Ancient Egypt. Thames & Hudson. ISBN 0-500-05120-8.
