= Hermopolis =

Village in Minya Governorate, Egypt

- Ϣⲙⲟⲩⲛ (Coptic)
- الأشمونين
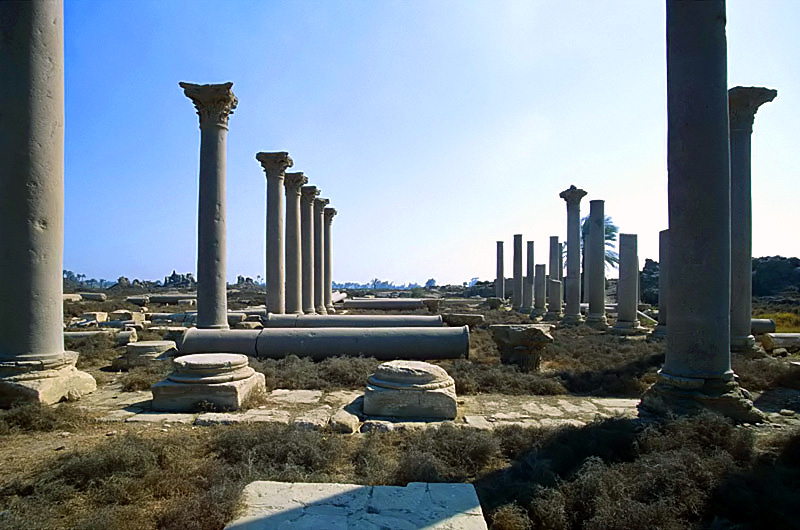
- Basilica of Hermopolis

- Location within Egypt
- 27°46′53″N 30°48′14″E
- Type: Settlement
- Location: El Ashmunein, Minya Governorate, Egypt
- Region: Upper Egypt

Site notes
- Condition: In ruins

Hermopolis (or Hermopolis Magna) was a major city in antiquity, located near the boundary between Lower and Upper Egypt. Its Egyptian name Khemenu derives from the eight deities (the Ogdoad) said to reside in the city.

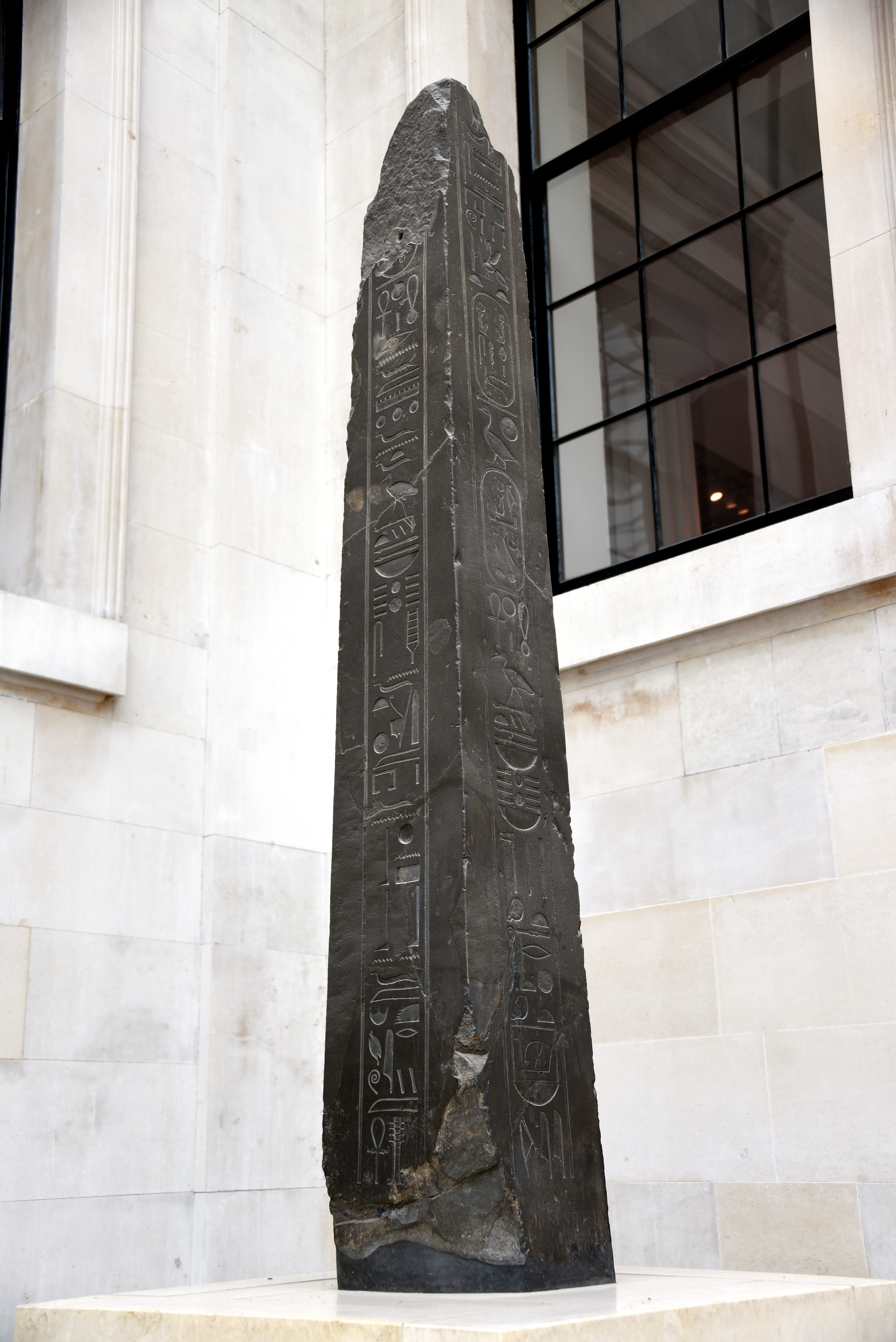
Black siltstone obelisk of King Nectanebo II (r. 358 to 340 BCE). According to the vertical inscriptions he set up this obelisk at the doorway of the sanctuary of Thoth Thrice-Great, Lord of Hermopolis. It is now on display in the British Museum, London.

A provincial capital since the Old Kingdom of Egypt, Hermopolis developed into a major city of Roman Egypt, and an early Christian center from the third century. It was abandoned after the Muslim conquest of Egypt but was restored as both a Latin Catholic (meanwhile suppressed) and a Coptic Orthodox titular see.

Its remains are located near the modern town of el-Ashmunein (from the Coptic name) in Mallawi, Minya Governorate, Egypt.

== Name ==
Z1 Z1 Z1 Z1 Z1 Z1 Z1 Z1 nw w niwt t Z1
ḫmnw
in hieroglyphs
Era: Middle Kingdom
(2055–1650 BC)

The common English name is Hermopolis (Ancient Greek: Ἑρμούπολις Hermoúpolis "the City of Hermes", also Hermopolis Magna, Ἑρμοῦ πόλις μεγάλη Hermoû pólis megálẽ, Ancient Egyptian: ḫmnw, lit. 'Eight' /χaˈmaːnaw/ (reconstructed pronunciation), Egyptological pronunciation: "Khemenu"; Coptic: Ϣⲙⲟⲩⲛ Shmūn, and thus Arabic: الأشمونين, romanized: al-Ashmunayn, lit. 'The Two Shmun').

Khemenu (Ḫmnw), the Egyptian language name of the city, means "Eight-Town", after the Ogdoad, a group of eight "primordial" deities whose cult was situated there. The name survived as Coptic Ϣⲙⲟⲩⲛ Shmun, from which the modern name el Ashmunein (Arabic: الأشمونين) is derived.

In Koine Greek, the city was called "The City of Hermes" since the Greeks identified Hermes with Thoth, because the city was the main cult centre of Thoth, the Pharaonic god of magic, healing, and wisdom and the patron of scribes. Thoth was associated in the same way with the Phoenician deity Eshmun. Inscriptions at the temple call the god "The Lord of Eshmun".

== History ==
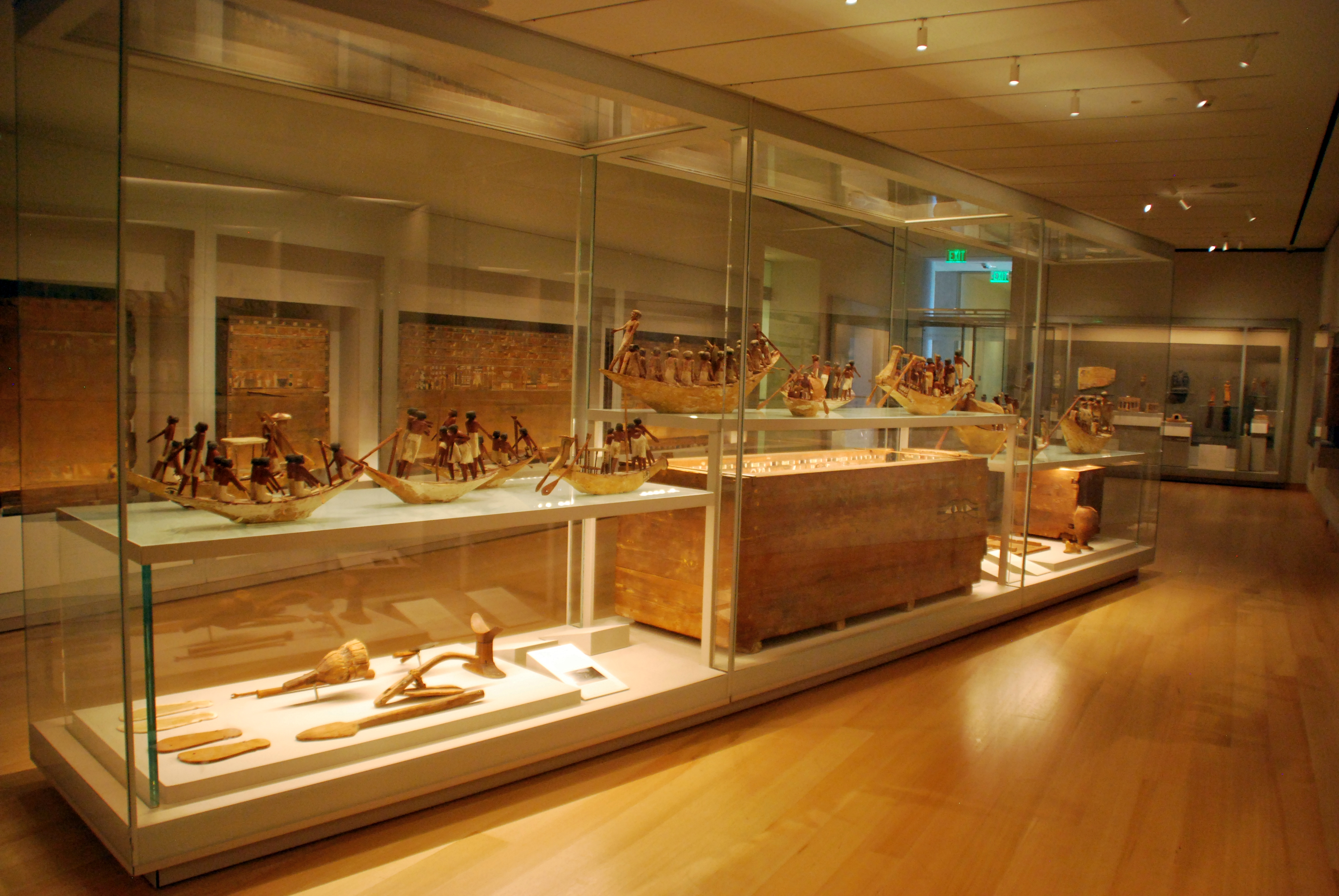
Objects from the tomb of Djehutynakht, a nomarch during the Middle Kingdom era of Egypt.

The city was the capital of the Hare nome (the fifteenth nome of Upper Egypt) in the Heptanomis. Hermopolis stood on the borders of Upper and Lower Egypt, and, for many ages, the Thebaid or upper country extended much further to the north than in more recent periods. As the border town, Hermopolis was a place of great resort and opulence, ranking second to Thebes alone. A little to south of the city was the castle of Hermopolis, at which point rivercraft from the Thebaid paid tolls (Ἑρμοπολιτάνη φυλακή, the Bahr Yussef in Arabic). The grottos of Beni Hasan, near Antinoöpolis on the opposite bank of the Nile, were the common cemeteries of the Hermopolitans because although the river divided the city from its necropolis, from the wide curve of the western hills at this point, it was easier to ferry the dead over the water than to transport them by land to the hills.

Hermopolis became a significant city in the Roman province of Thebais Prima in the administrative diocese of Egypt.

The principal Egyptian deities worshipped at Hermopolis were Typhon (Set) and Thoth. Typhon was represented by a hippopotamus, on which sat a hawk fighting with a serpent. Thoth, whom the ancient Greeks associated with Hermes because they were both gods of magic and writing, was represented by the ibis.

== Ecclesiastical history ==
A Christian tradition holds it to be the place where the Holy Family found refuge during its exile in Egypt.

Hermopolis Maior was a suffragan diocese of the provincial capital's Metropolitan Archdiocese of Antinoe, in the sway of the Patriarchate of Alexandria. Like most, it faded under Islam.

List of bishops of Hermopolis:

- Conon (circa 250)
- Fasileus (in 325)
- Dios (circa 350)
- Plusianus (4th century)
- Andreas (in 431)
- Gennadius (circa 444 - after 449)
- Victor (circa 448/463)
- Ulpianus (6th century)
- Johannes I (6th century)
- Johannes II (6th-7th century)
- Isidorus (7th century)
- Eugenius (?)
- Paulus (?)

The city was a titular diocese in the Roman Catholic Church, and still is (?) in the Coptic Orthodox Church. For the Coptic Church, the diocese is led by the Metropolitan of Mallawi, Ansina and Ashmonin. The diocese was nominally restored in the 18th century as Latin Titular bishopric of Hermopolis Maior (Latin; 1925-1929 renamed Hermopolis Magna) / Ermopoli Maggiore (Curiate Italian) Its territory was reassigned in 1849 to the Coptic Catholic Eparchy of Mina, as a restoration of Hermopolis (as its Latin title attests).

In 1949 the titular see was suppressed, having had the following incumbents, all of the fitting Episcopal (lowest) rank :

- Luigi Antonio Valdina Cremona (1729.03.23 – death 1758.10.24) (Italian) no actual prelature recorded
- Dominik Józef Kiełczewski (1760.07.21 – death 1776.02.28) as Auxiliary Bishop of Roman Catholic Diocese of Chełm (Poland) (1760.07.21 – retired 1775.07.14) and on emeritate
- Bishop-elect? Bernardo Maria Serio (1802.08.09 – death ?) as Auxiliary Bishop of Archdiocese of Palermo (Sicily, Italy) (1802.08.09 – ?)
- Denis-Antoine-Luc de Frayssinous (French) (1822.04.19 – death 1841.12.12) no actual prelature recorded
- Antoni Melchior Fijałkowski (1842.01.27 – 1856.09.18) as Apostolic Administrator of Archdiocese of Warszawa (Warschau, Poland) (1844 – 1856.09.18); later succeeded as Metropolitan Archbishop of Warszawa (1856.09.18 – 1861.10.05)
- Agostino Franco (1858.06.15 – death 1877) as Ordinary of Silicia of the Italo-Albanese (Italy) (1858.06.15 – 1859) and Ordinary of Italia continentale of the Italo-Albanese (Italy) (1858.06.15 – 1860)
- Charles-Bonaventure-François Theuret (1878.07.15 – 1887.03.15) as Apostolic Administrator of the Subiaco Benedictine Abbey nullius of Saints-Nicholas-et-Benoît (Monaco) (1878.07.15 – 1887.03.15); later (see promoted) first Bishop of Monaco (Monaco) (1887.03.15 – death 1901.11.11)
- Father Jan Ignacy Korytkowski (1888.04.27 – 1888.05.14) as Auxiliary bishop of Archdiocese of Gniezno (Gnesen, Poland) (1888.04.27 – 1888.05.14)
- Raphael Valenza (1889.05.24 – death 1897.12.22) as Auxiliary Bishop of Archdiocese of Chieti (Italy) (1889.05.24 – 1897.12.22)
- Robert Brindle (1899.01.29 – 1901.12.06) as Auxiliary Bishop of Archdiocese of Westminster (England, UK) (1899.01.29 – 1901.12.06); later Bishop of Nottingham (England) (1901.12.06 – 1915.06.01), emeritus as Titular Bishop of Tacapæ (1915.06.01 – death 1916.06.27)
- Juan Bautista Benlloch y Vivo (1901.12.16 – 1906.12.06) as Apostolic Administrator of Solsona (Spain) (1901.12.16 – 1906.12.06); later Bishop of Urgell (Spain) (1906.12.06 – 1919.01.07), Metropolitan Archbishop of Burgos (Spain) (1919.01.07 – death 1926.02.14), created Cardinal-Priest of S. Maria in Ara Coeli (1921.06.16 – 1926.02.14)
- John Jeremiah Lawler (1910.02.08 – 1916.01.29) as Auxiliary Bishop of Archdiocese of Saint Paul (USA) (1910.02.08 – 1916.01.29); later Bishop of Lead (1916.01.29 – 1930.08.01), Bishop of Rapid City (USA) (1930.08.01 – death 1948.03.11)
- Giorgio Glosauer (1917.07.07 – death 1926.06.09) as Auxiliary Bishop of Archdiocese of Praha (Prague, Czech Republic) (1917.07.07 – 1926.06.09)
- Eduardo José Herberhold, Friars Minor (O.F.M.) (1928.01.07 – 1931.01.30) as Coadjutor Bishop-Prelate of Territorial Prelature of Santarem (Brazil) (1928.01.07 – 1931.01.30); later Bishop of Ilhéus (Brazil) (1931.01.30 – death 1939.07.24)
- Francesco Fulgenzio Lazzati, O.F.M. (born Italy) (1931.07.14 – 1932.05.24) as Apostolic Vicar of Mogadishu (then Italian Somalia) (1931.07.14 – 1932.05.24).

== Remains ==
Hermopolis comparatively escaped the frequent wars which, in the decline both of the Pharaonic and Roman eras, devastated the Heptanomis; but, on the other hand, its structures have undergone severe changes under its Muslim rulers, who have burned its stones for lime or carried them away for building materials. A surviving Oxyrhynchus Papyrus of the 3rd century CE indicates that high-rise buildings with seven stories existed in the town. The collection of Arabic papyri in the John Rylands Library, Manchester, contains many documents referring to Hermopolis (Ushmun); they date from the 8th to 11th centuries CE.

=== The temple ===
The Ibis-headed god Thoth was, with his accompanying emblems, the Ibis and the Cynocephalus monkey, the most conspicuous among the sculptures upon the great portico of the temple of Hermopolis. His designation in inscriptions was "The Lord of Eshmoon". This portico was a work of the Pharaonic era, but the erections of the Ptolemies at Hermopolis were on a scale of great extent and magnificence and, although raised by Greek monarchs, are essentially Egyptian in their conception and execution. The portico, the only remnant of the temple, consists of a double row of pillars, six in each row. The architraves are formed of five stones; each passes from the centre of one pillar to that of the next, according to a well-known usage with Egyptian builders. The intercolumnation of the centre pillars is wider than that of the others; and the stone over the centre is twenty-five feet and six inches long. These columns were painted yellow, red and blue in alternate bands. There is also a peculiarity in the pillars of the Hermopolitan portico peculiar to themselves, or at least discovered only again in the temple of Gournou. (Dénon, L'Egypte, plate 41.) Instead of being formed of large masses placed horizontally above each other, they are composed of irregular pieces, so artfully adjusted that it is difficult to detect the lines of junction. The bases of these columns represent the lower leaves of the lotus; next come a number of concentric rings, like the hoops of a cask; and above these the pillars appear like bunches of reeds held together by horizontal bonds. Including the capital, each column is about 40 feet high; the greatest circumference is about 28 1/2 feet, about five feet from the ground, for they diminish in thickness both towards the base and towards the capital. The widest part of the intercolumnation is 17 feet; the other pillars are 13 feet apart.

=== Coptic Basilica ===
Outside the temple complex stand the remains of a basilica, built in the 5th century over earlier buildings. It is one of the most impressive Coptic buildings: 55 m long, it features a colonnaded transept ending in exedras and side galleries. The nave with the apse is 14.7 m wide, and the width of the aisles is 5.6 m. The church was discovered in 1942 by Moharam Kamal, later cleaned by an expedition from the Alexandria University, and in the years 1987–1990 documented by a Polish-Egyptian expedition from the Polish Centre of Mediterranean Archaeology University of Warsaw, State Ateliers for the Preservation of Cultural Heritage, and the Egyptian Ministry of Antiquities.

=== Museum ===
Currently there is a small open-air museum in which stand two massive statues of Thoth as a baboon worshipping the sun, and a few carved blocks of masonry.

== Famous people ==
- David of Hermopolis
- Severus Ibn al-Muqaffaʿ

== See also ==
- List of ancient Egyptian towns and cities
- List of Catholic dioceses in Egypt
- Coptic architecture

== Sources and external links ==
- Silhouette of Hermopolis Magna temple-from A History Of Egypt Volume V by J Graflon Milne retrieved 20:34GMT 27.9.11
- GCatholic - (former &) titular Latin see
- Sayed Hemeda, Abdulrahman Fahmy, Abbas Moustafa, Mahmoud Abd El Hafez, The Early Basilica Church, El-Ashmonein Archaeological Site, Minia, Egypt: Geo-Environmental Analysis and Engineering Characterization of the Building Materials, Open Journal of Geology 09/03 (2019)
- Marek Barański. Excavations at the basilica site at el-Ashmunein/ Hermopolis magna in 1987–1990. Polish Archaeology in the Mediterranean 3 (1992)

Bibliography - Ecclesiastical history

- Pius Bonifacius Gams, Series episcoporum Ecclesiae Catholicae, Leipzig 1931, p. 461
- Konrad Eubel, Hierarchia Catholica Medii Aevi, vol. 5, p. 219; vol. 6, p. 234
- Michel Lequien, Oriens christianus in quatuor Patriarchatus digestus, Paris 1740, Vol. II, coll. 595-596
- Gaetano Moroni, Dizionario di erudizione storico-ecclesiastica, Vol. 22, p. 61
- Klaas A. Worp, A Checklist of Bishops in Byzantine Egypt (A.D. 325 - c. 750), in Zeitschrift für Papyrologie und Epigraphik 100 (1994) 283-318
