= Regent College =

Graduate school of Christian Studies in Vancouver, British Columbia

- Type: Private theological school
- Established: 1968
- Affiliations: ATS; UBC
- Religious affiliation: Evangelicalism
- President: Paul Spilsbury
- Faculty: 12
- Students: 319
- Location: 5800 University Blvd., Vancouver, British Columbia, Canada; 49°15′56″N 123°14′38″W
- Campus: Located on University Endowment Lands, otherwise known as the campus of the University of British Columbia
- Website: regent-college.edu

Regent College is an interdenominational evangelical Christian College of Christian studies, and an affiliated college of the University of British Columbia, located next to the university's campus in the University Endowment Lands west of Vancouver, British Columbia. The school's stated mission is to "cultivate intelligent, vigorous, and joyful commitment to Jesus Christ, His church, and His world."

In 2024–25, Regent College reported enrolment at 319 students and 12 faculty. In any given year, one-third to one-half of students are Canadian, another one-quarter to one-third are American, and the remaining twenty to thirty per cent come from around the globe.

== History ==
Regent was established in 1968 to provide graduate theological education to the laity, and only in 1979 started a program to train students who will become clergy. After the first summer school class, the graduate Diploma of Christian Studies began; within two years, enrolment grew from 4 to 44 students and the Master of Christian Studies was added. Affiliation with UBC followed in 1975, and accreditation by the Association of Theological Schools in 1985. The last comprehensive evaluation occurred in 2010.

The principals and presidents of the college have been James M. Houston (1970–1978), Carl Armerding (1978–1988), Walter Wright Jr. (1988–2000), Rod Wilson (2000–2015), and Jeffrey P. Greenman (2015–2025). Greenman is the first alumnus of Regent College to become president. The current president is Paul Spilsbury who began his term in July 2025.

Regent initially rented rooms in various buildings at UBC, including St. Andrews Hall and Vancouver School of Theology, and occupied two fraternity houses on Wesbrook Mall for a time. In 1989, Regent moved into its own new building in the current location at the corner of Wesbrook & University, with the distinctive green roof. A subsequent capital campaign finished in 2006, adding the John Richard Allison Library and the Windtower to Regent College's architectural distinctiveness.

== Academic programs ==
Though Regent College is an affiliated school of the UBC, unlike other affiliated schools such as the Vancouver School of Economics, the university does not offer any theological degree due to the University Act. The college does offer four main graduate programs, all ATS-accredited:

- Graduate Diploma in Christian Studies (DipCS)
- Master of Arts in Christian Studies (MACS)
- Master of Arts in Theological Studies (MATS)
- Master of Divinity (M.Div.)
- Master of Theology (Th.M.)
- Master of Arts in leadership, Theology, and Society (MALTS)

== Buildings and features ==
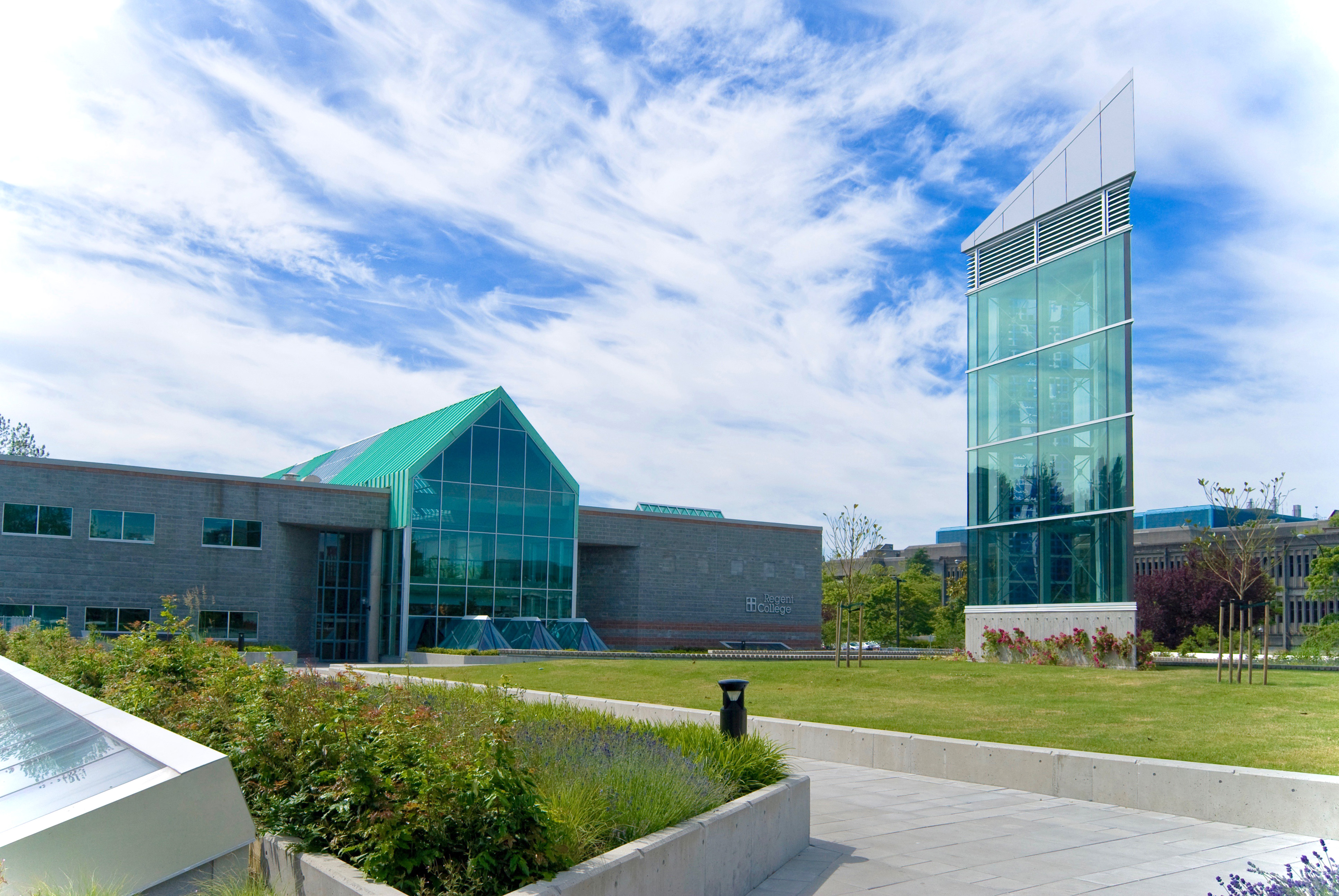
Regent Building and True North Tower

The John Richard Allison Library is one of the major theological libraries in Western Canada. It houses the resources of Regent and Carey Theological College. Its catalogue is shared with Carey Theological College, Vancouver School of Theology, and St. Mark's College.

Regent College Bookstore frequently hosts public lectures and booksignings, and has its own publishing program.

The Dal Schindell Gallery showcases seven annual exhibitions, including shows by Regent students in the Christianity and the Arts concentration.

The Chapel is the heart of worship and community building at Regent. The piano within is a Steinway grand.

True North Windtower features photovoltaic art glass by artist Sarah Hall, and it has been documented by the Institute for Stained Glass in Canada.

The Atrium & The Well, a coffee shop which grew out of one Regent student's final Christianity & the Marketplace project. In 2011 the kitchen off the Atrium was re-dedicated as the Rita Houston Kitchen, to mark the powerful impact of Rita Houston on Regent's community life over the years.

== Media ==
Regent College produces a wide variety of print and electronic media, including:

- Crux: A Quarterly Journal of Christian Thought and Opinion
- Regent World, a thrice-yearly newsletter
- EtCetera, a student newspaper published bi-weekly during the regular term.
- EtCetera Podcast, a student podcast published bi-weekly in partnership with the EtCetera student newspaper.
- ReFrame, a 10-week film based small group curriculum
- Regent Audio
- Regent Bookstore

== Faculty ==
Full-time faculty include:

- George H. Guthrie, Professor of New Testament
- Ross Hastings, Sangwoo Youtong Chee Chair Associate Professor of Pastoral Theology
- Jens Zimmermann, J. I. Packer Professor of Theology

Notable faculty emeriti include:

- Gordon Fee, New Testament Studies
- James M. Houston, Board of Governors' Professor; Spiritual Theology
- V. Philips Long, Old Testament
- J.I. Packer, Board of Governors' Professor; Theology
- Eugene Peterson
- Bruce Waltke, Old Testament Studies

Current and former fellows & scholars-in-residence include:

- Paul Barnett, bishop
- Marva Dawn, theologian
- Preston Manning, politician, Senior Fellow at the Marketplace Institute
- Alister McGrath, theologian, Teaching Fellow
- Luci Shaw, poet, remains a writer-in-residence at Regent College

Summer school classes are often taught by some notable Christian thinkers, including:

- Lynn H. Cohick, academic dean and professor of New Testament at Northern Seminary
- Michael J. Gorman, Raymond E. Brown Chair in Biblical Studies at St. Mary's Seminary & University
- Malcolm Guite, poet and priest
- Alister McGrath
- George Marsden
- Richard Mouw
- Mark Noll, historian
- Luci Shaw
- Andrew Walls
- John H. Walton, professor of Old Testament at Wheaton College (Illinois)
- N.T. Wright

== Alumni ==
=== Academia ===
- Nigel Biggar, Baron Biggar, Regius Professor of Moral and Pastoral Theology, Oxford University
- Markus Bockmuehl, Oxford University professor
- Celia Deane-Drummond, Director of the Laudato Si' Research Institute, University of Oxford.
- Alexander Chow, Senior Lecturer in Theology and World Christianity, School of Divinity, University of Edinburgh
- Christopher A. Hall, Chancellor of Eastern University (United States)

=== Arts and media ===
- Carolyn Arends
- Eugene H. Peterson, pastor and writer
- Gary Thomas, author
- Kathy Tyers, author

=== Clergy ===
- Paul Donison, Anglican bishop and dean of Christ Church Plano
- Walter Kim, Presbyterian Church in America minister and president of National Association of Evangelicals
- Felix Orji, bishop of the Anglican Diocese of All Nations
- Richard Reed, bishop of Saskatchewan
- Andrew Shie, assistant bishop of the Anglican Diocese of Kuching (Sarawak and Brunei Darussalam), first Anglican Bishop from Brunei

=== Other ===
- Mike Baird, former premier of New South Wales
- Joshua Harris, author of I Kissed Dating Goodbye

== See also ==
- Vancouver School of Theology
- University Endowment Lands
- University of British Columbia
- List of evangelical seminaries and theological colleges
