= Genesis creation narrative =

Creation myth of Judaism and Christianity

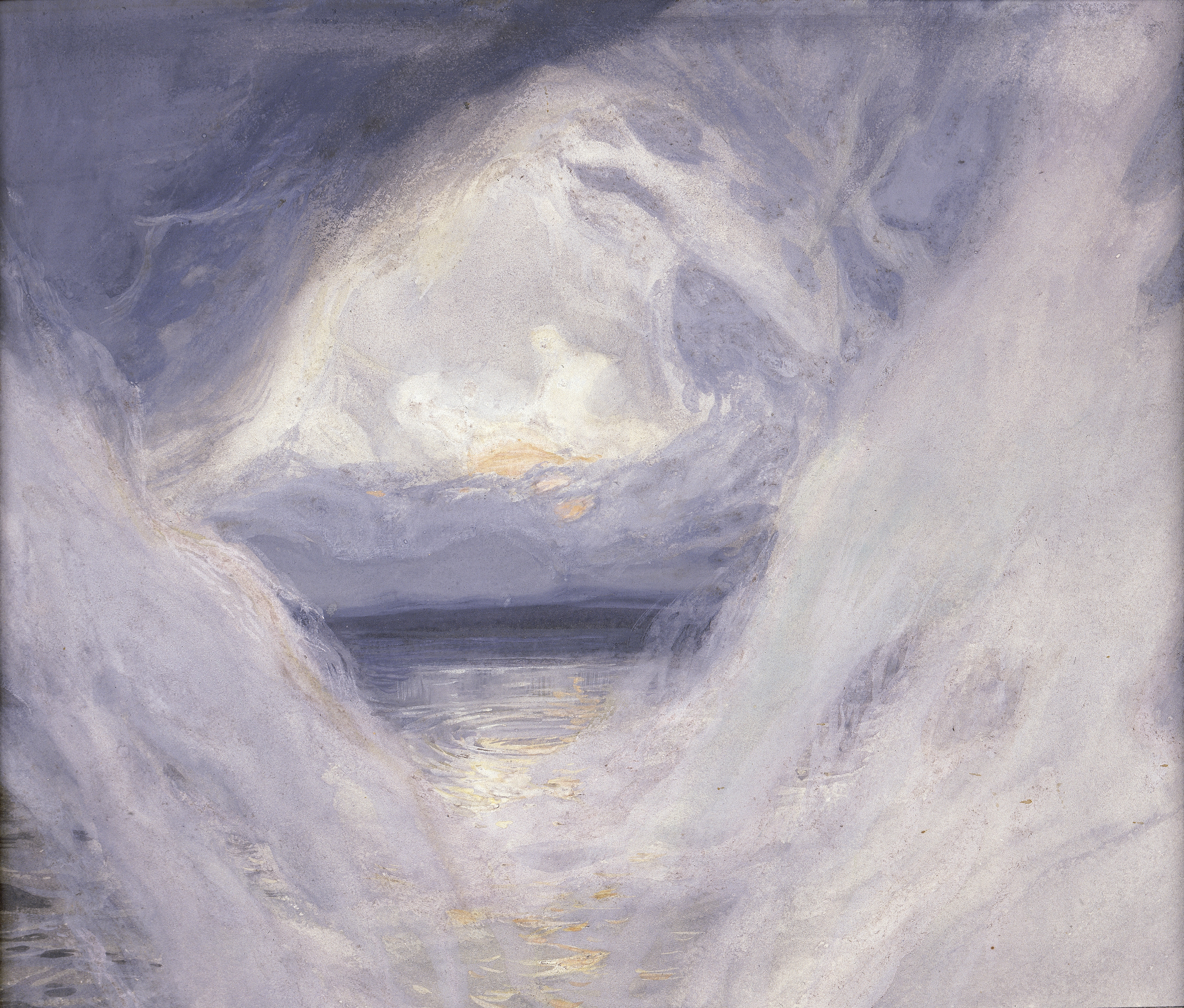
The Creation (1896–1902), by James Tissot

The creation myth (Note: The term myth is used here in its academic sense, meaning "a traditional story consisting of events that are ostensibly historical, though often supernatural, explaining the origins of a cultural practice or natural phenomenon". It is not being used to mean "something that is false". Scholarly writings frequently refer to Genesis as myth (Dolansky 2016). While the author of Genesis 1–11 "demythologised" his narrative by removing the Babylonian myths and those elements which did not fit with his own faith, it remains a myth in the sense of being a story of origins. (Hamilton 1990, pp. 57–58)) of Judaism and Christianity is found in chapters 1 and 2 of the Book of Genesis. While both faith traditions have historically understood the account as a single unified story, modern scholars of biblical criticism believe it to be a composite of two stories drawn from different sources expressing distinct views about the nature of God and creation. (Note: The Mosaic authorship of Genesis has been rejected in scholarship, and the Genesis creation narrative is thought to consist of two different stories, attributed to two different authors.: Ehrman (2024): "The book of Genesis is the first book of the Pentateuch, as the first five books of the Hebrew Bible are known. This includes Genesis, Exodus, Leviticus, Numbers, and Deuteronomy. Tradition says that Moses wrote these five books but the scholarly consensus is that Moses did not write any of them.; Ehrman (2021): "scholars have thought that the Pentateuch, the first five books of the Hebrew Bible (Genesis, Exodus, Leviticus, Numbers, Deuteronomy), were not written by Moses, but later, and that they represent not a single work by a single author, but a compilation of sources, each of them written at different times. The evidence for this view is quite overwhelming [...] The internal tensions in the Pentateuch came to be seen as particularly significant. Nowhere were these tensions more evident than in the opening accounts of the very first book, in the creation stories of Genesis chapters 1 and 2. Scholars came to recognize that what is said in Genesis 1 cannot be easily (or at all) reconciled with what is said in Genesis 2. These do not appear to be two complementary accounts of how the creation took place; they appear to be two accounts that are at odds with each other in fundamental and striking ways."; Daryl Charles (2013, pp. 2–3) notes that Evangelicals tend to a literal reading of Genesis, taking it as history, in contrast to a literary reading, but also explains that the interpretation of Genesis is a matter of (sometimes heated) dispute for Evangelicals.; For an example of an apologetic view, see Wayne Jackson, Are There Two Creation Accounts in Genesis?, Apologetics Press.)

According to the documentary hypothesis, the first account – which begins with Genesis 1:1 and ends with the first sentence of Genesis 2:4 (Note: The chapter and verse system predates modern scholarship. As a result, Genesis 2:4 is often treated as combining the final sentence of the first account and the opening clause of the first sentence of the second account: see also Garden of Eden#Notes.) – is from the later Priestly source (P), possibly composed during the 6th century BC. In this story, God (referred to with the title Elohim, a term related to the generic Hebrew word for 'god') creates the heavens and the Earth in six days, solely by issuing commands for it to be so – and then rests on, blesses, and sanctifies the seventh day (i.e., the biblical Sabbath). The second account, which consists of the remainder of Genesis 2, is from an earlier non-Priestly source, traditionally the Jahwist source (J) dated to the 10th or 9th century BC. In this story, God (referred to by the personal name Yahweh) creates Adam, the first man, by "forming" him from dust – and places him in the Garden of Eden where he is given dominion over the animals. The first woman, "built" from a rib taken from Adam's side, is created to be his matching companion; after the couple are expelled from the Garden in Genesis 3 for disobeying God, Adam names the woman Eve.

The first major comprehensive draft of the Torah – the series of five books which begins with Genesis and ends with Deuteronomy – theorized as being the J source, is thought to have been composed in either the late 7th or the 6th century BC, and was later expanded by other authors (the P source) into a work appreciably resembling the received text of Genesis. The authors of the text were influenced by Mesopotamian mythology and ancient Near Eastern cosmology, and borrowed several themes from them, adapting and integrating them with their unique belief in one God. (Note: Influence of Mesopotamian mythology: Klamm & Winitzer (2023): "The imprint of Mesopotamia's mythic thought and literature on Genesis' Primeval History (Genesis 1–11) is hard to overstate, even if the biblical unit also contains much that is non-Mesopotamian in origins, and even if it must ultimately be considered on its own terms and, more broadly, those of the Bible as a whole. But these factors cannot take away from the place of Mesopotamia's stories of origins in the Bible's opening chapters; and the latter, remarkably, do not fully conceal these antecedents. To the contrary, in its layout the biblical text appears frank about the locale of what preceded its eventual epic-making call to Abraham to 'go forth' (Gen. 12:1) from his homeland and begin anew in a faraway place."; For some evangelical views: James M. Rochford, "Did Genesis Borrow the Creation and Flood from Mesopotamian Myths?", Evidence Unseen) The combined narrative is a critique of the Mesopotamian theology of creation: Genesis affirms monotheism and denies polytheism.

== Composition ==
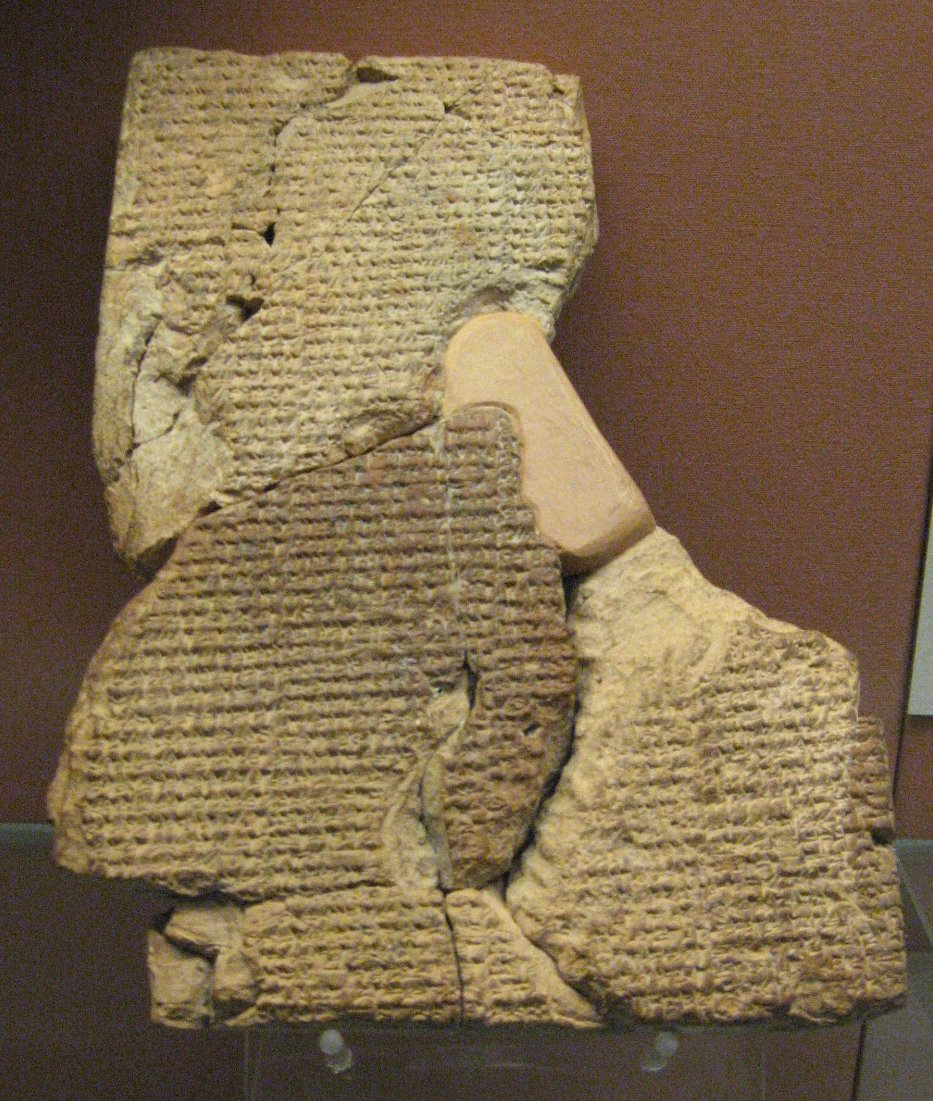
Cuneiform tablet with the Atra-Hasis epic in the British Museum

=== Genre ===
Scholars view Genesis as belonging to the literary genre of myth, a type of folklore consisting primarily of narrative that plays a fundamental role within a society. For scholars, this is in contrast to more vernacular usage of the term myth, which refers to a belief that is not true. Instead, the veracity of a myth is not a defining criterion. (Note: Hamilton (1990, pp. 57–58) notes that while Brevard Childs famously suggested that the author of Genesis 1–11 "demythologised" his narrative, meaning that he removed from his sources (the Babylonian myths) those elements which did not fit with his own faith, Genesis may still be referred to as mythical.)

=== Authorship and dating ===
Although Orthodox Jews and fundamentalist Christians attribute the authorship of the Book of Genesis to Moses "as a matter of faith", the hypothesis of Mosaic authorship has come into question since at least the 11th century, and scholarship has rejected it since the 17th century. Scholars of Biblical criticism conclude that Genesis, together with the following four books (making up what Jews call the Torah and biblical scholars call the Pentateuch), is "a composite work, the product of many hands and periods".

The creation narrative consists of two separate accounts drawn from different sources. Scholars associate the first account, which spans from Genesis 1:1 to the first sentence of Genesis 2:4, with the Priestly source (P), largely dated to the 6th century BC. The second account, which comprises the remainder of Genesis 2, stems from an older non-Priestly source – traditionally the Jahwist source (J) dated to the 10th or 9th century BC according to the documentary hypothesis.

The two stories were combined, but there is currently no scholarly consensus on when the narrative reached its final form. A common hypothesis among biblical scholars today is that the first major comprehensive narrative of the Pentateuch originated in the 7th or 6th century BC. Francesca Stavrakopoulou dates the written form of the Genesis creation account approximately to the "5th century BCE, but drawing on older mythologies". A sizeable minority of scholars believe that the first eleven chapters of Genesis, also known as the primeval history, can be dated to the 3rd century BC based on discontinuities between the contents of the work and other parts of the Hebrew Bible.

The "Persian imperial authorisation" theory, which has gained considerable interest and controversy, proposes that the Persians, after their conquest of Babylon in 538 BC, agreed to grant Jerusalem a large measure of local autonomy within the Achaemenid Empire, but required the local authorities to produce a single legal code accepted by the entire community. According to this theory, there were two powerful groups in the Judaic community: the priestly families who controlled the Temple and the landowning families who made up the "elders", which were in conflict over many issues. Each had its own "history of origins", but the Persian promise of greatly increased local autonomy for all provided a powerful incentive to cooperate in producing a single text.

=== Two stories ===
The creation narrative is made up of two stories, roughly equivalent to the first two chapters of the Book of Genesis. (There are no chapter divisions in the original Hebrew text; see chapters and verses of the Bible.) The first story refers to the creator deity using the title Elohim, a form of the generic Hebrew word for 'god' – translated into English as "God". The second story refers to the creator deity using a composite name, which puts his personal name Yahweh (written in Hebrew as the Tetragrammaton) together with Elohim – translated into English as "LORD God".

Traditional Jewish and evangelical scholars such as C. John Collins explain this as a single author's variation in style in order to, for example, emphasize the unity and transcendence of God, who created the heavens and Earth by himself in the first narrative. Critical scholars such as Richard Elliot Friedman, on the contrary, take this as evidence of multiple authorship. Friedman states that originally, the J source only used Yahweh, but a later editor added Elohim to form the composite name: "It therefore appears to be an effort by the Redactor (R) to soften the transition from the P creation, which uses only 'God' (43 times), to the coming J stories, which use only the name YHWH."

The first account employs a repetitious structure of divine fiat and fulfillment, then the statement "And there was evening and there was morning, the [n^{th}] day", for each of the six days of creation. In each of the first three days, there is an act of division: day one divides the darkness from light, day two the "waters above" from the "waters below", and day three the sea from the land. In each of the next three days, these divisions are populated: day four populates the darkness and light with the Sun, Moon, and stars; day five populates seas and skies with fish and fowl; and finally, land-based creatures and humanity populate the land. It concludes with "God" ceasing involvement with his creations.

In the second story, Yahweh creates Adam, the first man, from dust and places him in the Garden of Eden. There, he is given dominion over the animals. Eve, the first woman, is created from Adam's rib as his companion.

A literary bridge joins the primary accounts in each chapter in Genesis 2:4, reading, "These are the generations of the heavens and of the earth when they were created." This echoes the first line of Genesis 1, "In the beginning God created the heaven and the earth", and is reversed in the next phrase, "... in the day that the LORD God made the earth and the heavens". This verse is one of ten "generations" (Hebrew: toledot) phrases used throughout Genesis, which provide a literary structure to the book. They normally function as headings to what comes after, but the position of this, the first of the series, has been the subject of much debate.

The overlapping stories of Genesis 1 and 2 are usually regarded as contradictory but also complementary, (Note: Levenson (2004, p. 9): "One aspect of narrative in Genesis that requires special attention is its high tolerance for different versions of the same event, a well-known feature of ancient Near Eastern literature, from earliest times through rabbinic midrash [...] This could not have happened if the existence of variation were seen as a serious defect or if rigid consistency were deemed essential to effective storytelling.") with the first (the P story) concerned with the creation of the entire cosmos while the second (the J story) focuses on man as moral agent and cultivator of his environment. (Note: David M. Carr points to the differences between the two stories. He argues that the highly regimented seven-day narrative of Genesis 1 features an omnipotent God who creates a god-resembling humanity, while the one-day creation of Genesis 2 uses a simple linear narrative, a God who can fail as well as succeed, and a humanity which is not god-like but is punished for attempting to become god-like (Carr 1996, pp. 62–64). Even the order and method of creation differs (Carr 1996, pp. 62–64). "Together, this combination of parallel character and contrasting profile point to the different origin of materials in Genesis 1 and Genesis 2, however elegantly they have now been combined" (Carr 1996, p. 64). C. John Collins, in contrast, states that "the assertion that the P account lacks anthropomorphisms is mistaken", pointing to the imagery of God as "a craftsman going through his workweek". Collins doubts that the stories come from different sources, and says that, since the original sources are "unrecoverable", the "literary whole invites us to read the two pericopes in a complementary way". Thus he highlights the "overall flow of the narrative", viewing the first narrative as a "big-picture" account followed by a "close-up" on the way God created humanity in the second narrative. He states that "if someone produced this text by stitching sources together, he left the seams smooth indeed". (Collins 2006, pp. 229–231))

=== Mesopotamian influence ===
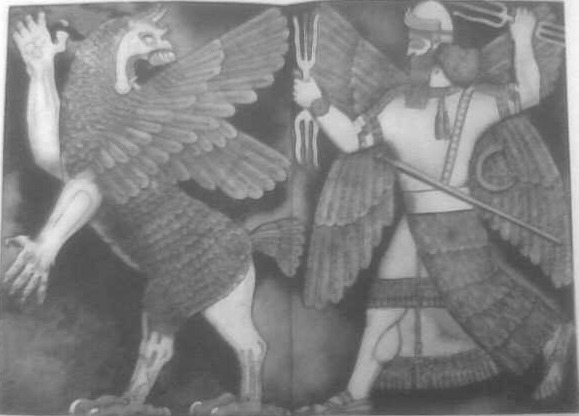
Marduk, god of Babylon, destroying Tiamat, the dragon of primeval chaos

Comparative mythology provides historical and cross-cultural perspectives for Jewish mythology. Both sources behind the Genesis creation narrative were influenced by Mesopotamian mythology, borrowing several themes from them but adapting them to Israelite religion and establishing a monotheistic creation in opposition to the polytheistic creation myth of ancient Israel's neighbors. (Note: Klamm & Winitzer (2023): "The reason for this admission of Mesopotamian priority is easy enough to appreciate. When it came to world origins, the traditions of this 'nation from old' (Jer. 5:15)—traditions that, as the story of Gilgamesh makes explicit, brim with their own antiquity—could not simply be brushed aside. If, then, the Bible was to offer something meaningful about such topics, Mesopotamia's version of events would necessarily have to be addressed. The challenge presented by Mesopotamia, therefore, would amount to a delicate balancing act: How was the Bible to incorporate this ancient tradition while at the same time not losing its own claim for a theological revolution?")

Genesis 1 bears striking similarities and differences with Enuma Elish, a Babylonian creation myth. The myth begins with two primeval entities: Abzu, the male freshwater deity, and Tiamat, the female saltwater deity. The first gods were born from their sexual union. The younger gods killed both Apsu and Tiamat. Marduk, the leader of the gods, builds the world with Tiamat's body, which he splits in two. With one half, he creates a dome-shaped firmament in the sky to hold back Tiamat's upper waters. With the other half, Marduk forms dry land to hold back her lower waters. Marduk then organises the heavenly bodies and assigns tasks to the gods in maintaining the cosmos. When the gods complain about their work, Marduk creates humans out of the blood of the god Kingu. The grateful gods build a temple for Marduk in Babylon. This is similar to the Baal Cycle, in which the Canaanite god Baal builds himself a cosmic temple over seven days.

In both Genesis 1 and Enuma Elish, creation consists of bringing order out of chaos. Before creation, there was nothing but a cosmic ocean. During creation, a dome-shaped firmament is put in place to hold back the water and make Earth habitable. Both conclude with the creation of a human called "man" and the building of a temple for the god (in Genesis 1, this temple is the entire cosmos). In contrast to Enuma Elish, Genesis 1 is monotheistic. There is no theogony (account of God's origins), and there is no trace of the resistance to the reduction of chaos to order (Greek: theomachy, lit. "God-fighting"), all of which mark the Mesopotamian creation accounts. The gods in Enuma Elish are amoral; they have limited powers, and they create humans to be their slaves. In Genesis 1, however, God is all-powerful. He creates humans in the divine image and cares for their wellbeing, and gives them dominion over every living thing.

Enuma Elish has also left traces on Genesis 2. Both begin with a series of statements of what did not exist at the moment when creation began; Enuma Elish has a spring (in the sea) as the point where creation begins, paralleling the spring (on the land; Genesis 2 is notable for being a "dry" creation story) in Genesis 2:6 that "watered the whole face of the ground"; in both myths, the respective deities first create a man to serve them, then animals and vegetation. At the same time, and as with Genesis 1, the Jewish version has drastically changed its Babylonian model: Eve, for example, seems to fill the role of a mother goddess when, in Genesis 4:1, she says that she has "created a man with Yahweh", but she is not a divine being like her Babylonian counterpart.

Genesis 2 has close parallels with a second Mesopotamian myth, the Atra-Hasis epic – parallels that, in fact, extend throughout Genesis 2–11, from the Creation to the Flood and its aftermath. The two share numerous plot details (e.g., the divine garden and the role of the first man in the garden, the creation of the man from a mixture of earth and divine substance, the chance of immortality), and have a similar overall theme: the gradual clarification of man's relationship with God(s) and animals.

=== Cosmology ===
The Apollo 8 Christmas Eve broadcast and reading from the Book of Genesis, 1968

Genesis 1–2 reflects ancient ideas about science: in the words of E. A. Speiser, "on the subject of creation biblical tradition aligned itself with the traditional tenets of Babylonian science." The opening words of Genesis 1, "In the beginning God created the heavens and the earth", sum up the belief of the author(s) that Yahweh, the God of Israel, was solely responsible for the creation and had no rivals. Later Jewish thinkers, adopting ideas from Greek philosophy, concluded that God's Wisdom, Word and Spirit penetrated all things and gave them unity. Christianity, in turn, adopted these ideas and identified Jesus with the creative word: "In the beginning was the Word, and the Word was with God, and the Word was God" (John 1:1). When the Jews came into contact with Greek thought, there followed a major reinterpretation of the underlying cosmology of the Genesis narrative. The biblical authors conceived the cosmos as a flat disc-shaped Earth in the centre, an underworld for the dead below, and heaven above. Below the Earth were the "waters of chaos", the cosmic sea, home to mythic monsters defeated and slain by God; in Exodus 20:4, God warns against making an image "of anything that is in the waters under the earth". There were also waters above the Earth, and so the raqia (firmament), a solid bowl, was necessary to keep them from flooding the world. During the Hellenistic period, this was largely replaced by a more "scientific" model as imagined by Greek philosophers, according to which the Earth was a sphere at the centre of concentric shells of celestial spheres containing the Sun, Moon, stars, and planets.

The idea that God created the world out of nothing (creatio ex nihilo) has become central today to Islam, Christianity, and Judaism – indeed, the medieval Jewish philosopher Maimonides felt it was the only concept that the three religions shared – yet it is not found directly in Genesis, nor in the entire Hebrew Bible. According to Walton, the Priestly authors of Genesis 1 were concerned not with the origins of matter (the material which God formed into the habitable cosmos), but with assigning roles so that the cosmos should function. John Day, however, considers that Genesis 1 clearly provides an account of the creation of the material universe. Even so, the doctrine had not yet been fully developed in the early 2nd century AD, although early Christian scholars were beginning to see a tension between the idea of world-formation and the omnipotence of God; by the beginning of the 3rd century this tension was resolved, world-formation was overcome, and creation ex nihilo had become a fundamental tenet of Christian theology.

=== Alternative biblical creation accounts ===
The Genesis narratives are not the only biblical creation accounts. The Bible preserves two contrasting models of creation. The first is the logos (speech) model, where a supreme God "speaks" dormant matter into existence. Genesis 1 is an example of creation by speech.

The second is the agon (struggle or combat) model, in which it is God's victory in battle over the monsters of the sea that marks his sovereignty and might. There is no complete combat myth preserved in the Bible. However, there are fragmentary allusions to such a myth in Isaiah 27:1, Isaiah 51:9–10, Job 26:12–13. These passages describe how God defeated the forces of chaos. These forces are personified as sea monsters. These monsters are variously named Yam ('sea'), Nahar ('river'), Leviathan ('coiled one'), Rahab ('arrogant one'), and Tannin ('dragon').

Psalm 74 and the allusion in Isaiah 51 recall a Canaanite myth in which God creates the world by vanquishing the water deities: "Awake, awake! ... It was you that hacked Rahab in pieces, that pierced the Dragon! It was you that dried up the Sea, the waters of the great Deep, that made the abysses of the Sea a road that the redeemed might walk...".

== First narrative: Genesis 1:1–2:4a ==
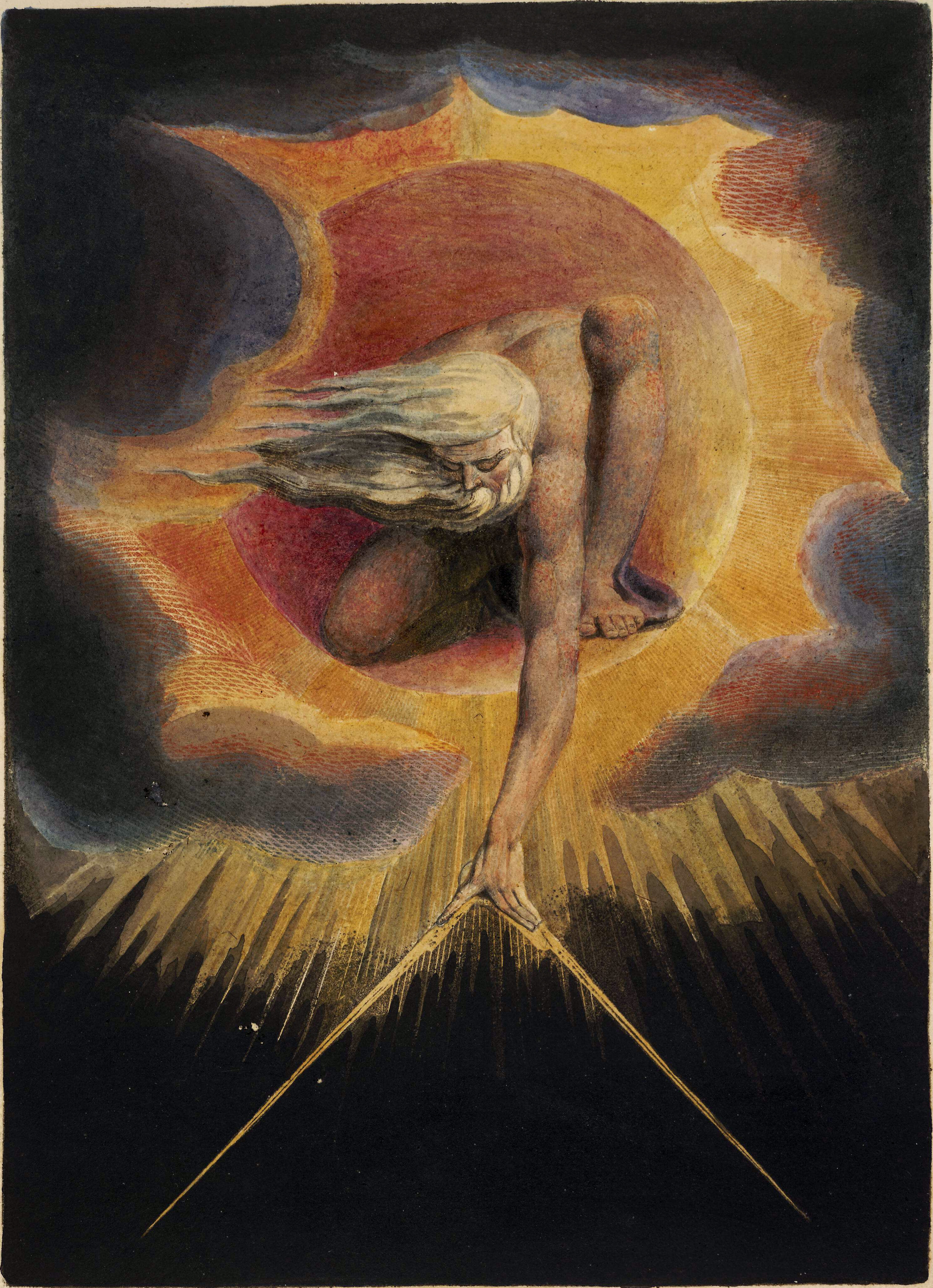
The Ancient of Days by William Blake (Copy D, 1794)

=== Background ===
The first creation account is divided into seven days during which God creates light (day 1); the sky (day 2); the Earth, seas, and vegetation (day 3); the Sun and Moon (day 4); animals of the air and sea (day 5); and land animals and humans (day 6). God rested from his work on the seventh day of creation, the Sabbath.

The use of numbers in ancient texts was often numerological rather than factual – that is, the numbers were used because they held some symbolic value to the author. The number seven, denoting divine completion, permeates Genesis 1: verse 1:1 consists of seven words, verse 1:2 has fourteen, and 2:1–3 has 35 words (5×7); Elohim is mentioned 35 times, "heaven/firmament" and "earth" 21 times each, and the phrases "and it was so" and "God saw that it was good" occur 7 times each.

The cosmos created in Genesis 1 bears a striking resemblance to the Tabernacle in Exodus 35–40, which was the prototype of the Temple in Jerusalem and the focus of priestly worship of Yahweh; for this reason, and because other Middle Eastern creation stories also climax with the construction of a temple as a house for the creator god, Genesis 1 can be interpreted as a description of the construction of the cosmos as God's house, for which the Temple in Jerusalem served as the earthly representative.

=== Pre-creation (Genesis 1:1–2) ===
When God began to create the heavens and the earth, the earth was complete chaos, and darkness covered the face of the deep, while a wind from God swept over the face of the waters.

— Genesis 1:1–2 (NRSVue)

The opening phrase of Genesis 1:1 is traditionally translated in English as "in the beginning God created". This translation suggests creatio ex nihilo ('creation from nothing'). The Hebrew, however, is ambiguous and can be translated in other ways. The NRSV, published in 1989, translates verses 1 and 2 as, "In the beginning when God created the heavens and the earth, the earth was a formless void ..." This translation suggests that earth, in some way, already existed when God began his creative activity. The NRSV Updated Edition, published in 2021, represents the evolution of the majority scholarly position, that the initial Hebrew word b'reshit (which does not use the definite article) is in the grammatical construct state, specifying that the beginning of the acts in question are being described – rather than being its own clause that indicates an absolute position in time.

Scholars such as R. N. Whybray, Christine Hayes, Michael Coogan, Cynthia Chapman, and John H. Walton argue that Genesis 1:1 describes the creation of an ordered universe out of preexisting, chaotic material, as creatio ex nihilo is thought to be a philosophical concept alien to the text's original audience. Others, including John Day and David Toshio Tsumura argue that Genesis 1:1 describes the initial creation of the universe, the former writing: "Since the inchoate earth and the heavens in the sense of the air/wind were already in existence in Gen. 1:2, it is most natural to assume that Gen. 1:1 refers to God's creative act in making them."

The word "created" translates the Hebrew bara', a word used only for God's creative activity; people do not engage in bara'. Walton argues that bara' does not necessarily refer to the creation of matter. In the ancient Near East, "to create" meant assigning roles and functions. The bara' which God performs in Genesis 1 concerns bringing "heaven and earth" from chaos into ordered existence. Day disputes Walton's functional interpretation of the creation narrative. Day argues that material creation is the "only natural way of taking the text" and that this interpretation was the only one for most of history.

Most interpreters consider the phrase "heaven and earth" to be a merism meaning the entire cosmos. Genesis 1:2 describes the earth as completely unordered, alternatively translated as "formless and void". This phrase is a translation of the Hebrew tohu wa-bohu (תֹהוּ וָבֹהוּ). Tohu by itself means 'emptiness' or 'futility'. It is used to describe the desert wilderness. Bohu has no known meaning, although it appears to be related to the Arabic word bahiya ('to be empty'), and was apparently coined to rhyme with and reinforce tohu. The phrase appears also in Jeremiah 4:23 where the prophet warns Israel that rebellion against God will lead to the return of darkness and chaos, "as if the earth had been 'uncreated'".

Verse 2 continues, "darkness covered the face of the deep". The word deep translates the Hebrew təhôm (תְהוֹם), a primordial ocean. Darkness and təhôm are two further elements of chaos in addition to tohu wa-bohu. In Enuma Elish, the watery deep is personified as the goddess Tiamat, the enemy of Marduk. In Genesis, however, there is no such personification. The elements of chaos are not seen as evil but as indications that God has not begun his creative work.

Verse 2 concludes with, "And the ruach of God [Elohim] moved upon the face of the waters." There are several options for translating the Hebrew word ruach (רוּחַ). It could mean 'breath', 'wind', or 'spirit' in different contexts. The traditional translation is "spirit of God". In the Hebrew Bible, the spirit of God is understood to be an extension of God's power. The term is analogous to saying the "hand of the Lord" (2 Kings 3:15). Historically, Christian theologians supported "spirit" as it provided biblical support for the presence of the Holy Spirit, the third person of the Trinity, at creation.

Other interpreters argue for translating ruach as "wind". For example, the NRSV renders it "wind from God". Likewise, the word elohim can sometimes function as a superlative adjective (such as "mighty" or "great"). The phrase ruach elohim may therefore mean "great wind". The connection between wind and watery chaos is also seen in the Genesis flood narrative, where God uses wind to make the waters subside in Genesis 8:1.

In Enuma Elish, the storm god Marduk defeats Tiamat with his wind. While stories of a cosmic battle prior to creation were familiar to ancient Israelites, there is no such battle in Genesis 1 though the text includes the primeval ocean and references to God's wind. Instead, Genesis 1 depicts a single God whose power is uncontested and who brings order out of chaos.

=== Six days of Creation (1:3–2:3) ===
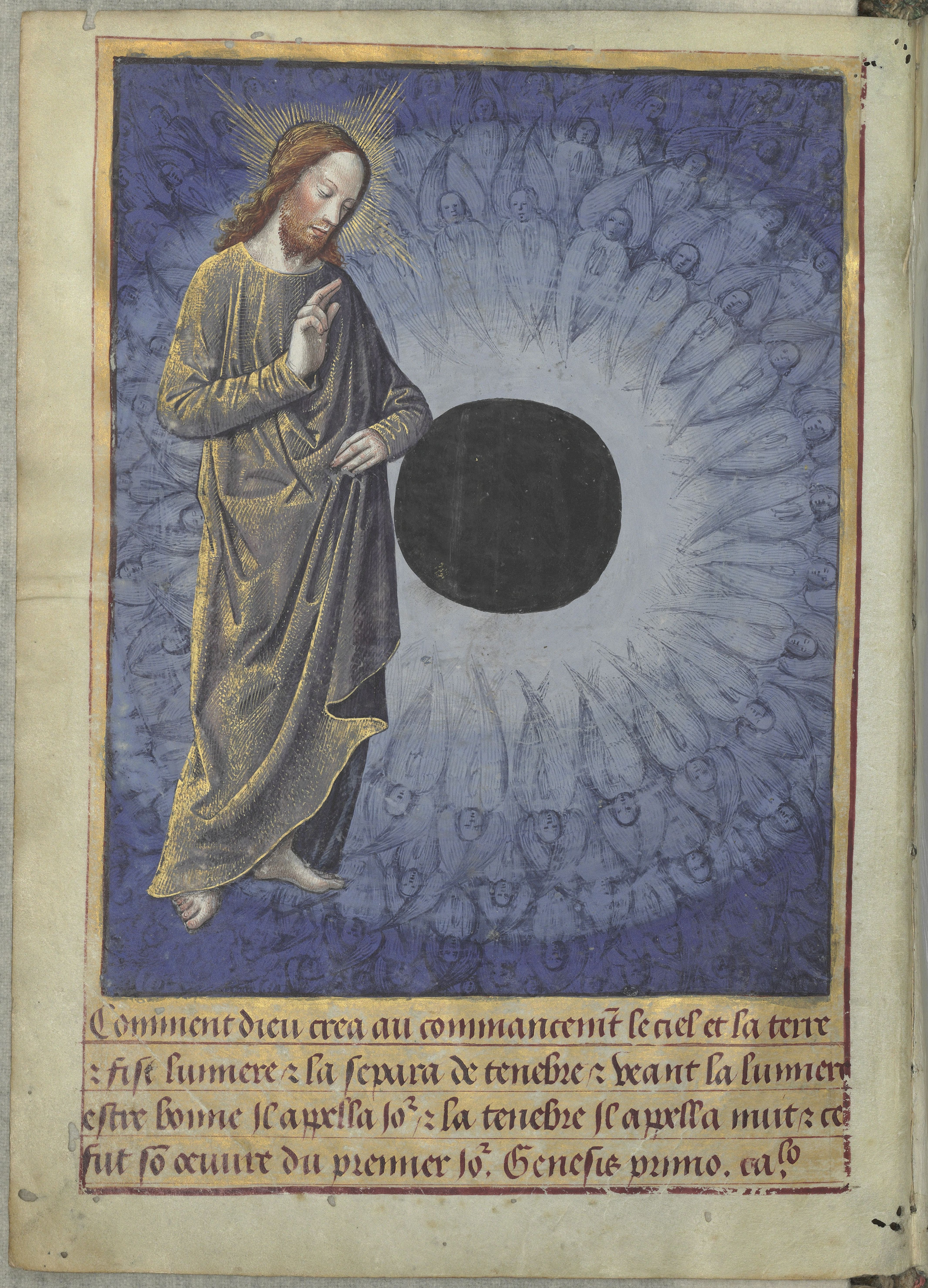
The first day of creation, by Jean Colombe from the Heures de Louis de Laval (see Louis de Laval)

Creation takes place over six days. The creative acts are arranged so that the first three days set up the environments necessary for the creations of the last three days to thrive. For example, God creates light on the first day and the light-producing heavenly bodies on the fourth day.

Days of Creation
Day 1	Light
Day 2	Sea, firmament
Day 3	Land, plants
Day 4	Celestial bodies
Day 5	Birds and fish
Day 6	Land animals, humans

Each day follows a similar literary pattern:

1. Introduction: "And God said"
2. Command: "Let there be"
3. Report: "And it was so"
4. Evaluation: "And God saw that it was good"
5. Time sequence: "And there was evening, and there was morning"

Verse 31 sums up all of creation with, "God saw every thing that He had made, and, indeed, it was very good". According to biblical scholar R. N. Whybray, "This is the craftsman's assessment of his own work ... It does not necessarily have an ethical connotation: it is not mankind that is said to be 'good', but God's work as craftsman."

At the end of the sixth day, when creation is complete, the world is a cosmic temple in which the role of humanity is the worship of God. This parallels Enuma Elish and also echoes Job 38, where God recalls how the stars, the "sons of God", sang when the corner-stone of creation was laid.

==== First day (1:3–5) ====
Then God said, "Let there be light," and there was light. And God saw that the light was good, and God separated the light from the darkness. God called the light Day, and the darkness he called Night. And there was evening and there was morning, the first day.

— Genesis 1:3–5 (NRSVue)

The process of creation illustrates God's sovereignty and omnipotence. God creates by fiat; things come into existence by divine decree. Like a king, God has merely to speak for things to happen. On the first day, God creates light, separates the light from the darkness, and names both concepts. God therefore creates time.

Creation by speech is not found in Mesopotamian mythology, but it is present in some ancient Egyptian creation myths. While some Egyptian accounts have a god creating the world by sneezing or masturbating, the Memphite Theology has Ptah create by speech. In Genesis, creative acts begin with speech and are finalized with naming. This has parallels in other ancient Near Eastern cultures. In the Memphite Theology, the creator god names everything. Similarly, Enuma Elish begins when heaven, earth, and the gods were unnamed. Walton writes, "In this way of thinking, things did not exist unless they were named." According to biblical scholar Nahum Sarna, this similarity is "wholly superficial" because in other ancient narratives creation by speech involves magic:

The pronouncement of the right word, like the performance of the right magical actions, is able to, or rather, inevitably must, actualize the potentialities which are inherent in the inert matter. In other words, it implies a mystic bond uniting matter to its manipulator ... Worlds apart is the Genesis concept of creation by divine fiat. Notice how the Bible passes over in absolute silence the nature of the matter—if any—upon which the divine word acted creatively. Its presence or absence is of no importance, for there is no tie between it and God. "Let there be!" or, as the Psalmist echoed it, "He spoke and it was so", [Psalm 33:9] refers not to the utterance of the magic word, but to the expression of the omnipotent, sovereign, unchallengeable will of the absolute, transcendent God to whom all nature is completely subservient.

==== Second day (1:6–8) ====
Ancient Israelites and other Near Eastern people understood the world to be surrounded by water. The upper waters are contained by a solid dome or firmament (the sky). The dome was supported by mountains.

And God said, "Let there be a dome in the midst of the waters, and let it separate the waters from the waters." So God made the dome and separated the waters that were under the dome from the waters that were above the dome. And it was so. God called the dome Sky. And there was evening and there was morning, the second day.

— Genesis 1:6–8 (NRSVue)

On the second day, God creates the firmament (rāqîa), which is named šamayim ('sky' or 'heaven'), to divide the waters. Water was a "primal generative force" in pagan mythologies. In Genesis, however, the primeval ocean possesses no powers and is completely at God's command.

Rāqîa is derived from rāqa', the verb used for the act of beating metal into thin plates. Ancient people throughout the world believed the sky was solid, and the firmament in Genesis 1 was understood to be a solid dome. In ancient Near Eastern cosmology, the earth is a flat disc surrounded by the waters above and the waters below. The firmament is a solid dome that rests on mountains at the edges of the earth. It is transparent, allowing men to see the blue of the waters above with "windows" to allow rain to fall. The sun, moon and stars are underneath the firmament. Deep within the earth is the underworld or Sheol. The earth is supported by pillars sunk into the waters below.

The waters above are the source of precipitation, so the function of the rāqîa was to control or regulate the weather. In the Genesis flood narrative, "all the fountains of the great deep burst forth" from the waters beneath the earth and from the "windows" of the sky.

==== Third day (1:9–13) ====
And God said, "Let the waters under the sky be gathered together into one place, and let the dry land appear." And it was so. God called the dry land Earth, and the waters that were gathered together he called Seas. And God saw that it was good. Then God said, "Let the earth put forth vegetation: plants yielding seed and fruit trees of every kind on earth that bear fruit with the seed in it." And it was so. The earth brought forth vegetation: plants yielding seed of every kind and trees of every kind bearing fruit with the seed in it. And God saw that it was good. And there was evening and there was morning, the third day.

— Genesis 1:9–13 (NRSVue)

By the end of the third day God has created a foundational environment of light, heavens, seas and earth. God does not create or make trees and plants, but instead commands the earth to produce them. The underlying theological meaning seems to be that God has given the previously barren earth the ability to produce vegetation, and it now does so at his command. "According to (one's) kind" appears to look forward to the laws found later in the Pentateuch, which lay great stress on holiness through separation.

In the first three days, God set up time, climate, and vegetation, all necessary for the proper functioning of the cosmos. For ancient peoples living in an agrarian society, climatic or agricultural disasters could cause widespread suffering through famine. Nevertheless, Genesis 1 describes God's original creation as "good" – the natural world was not originally a threat to human survival.

The three levels of the cosmos are next populated in the same order in which they were created – heavens, sea, earth.

==== Fourth day (1:14–19) ====
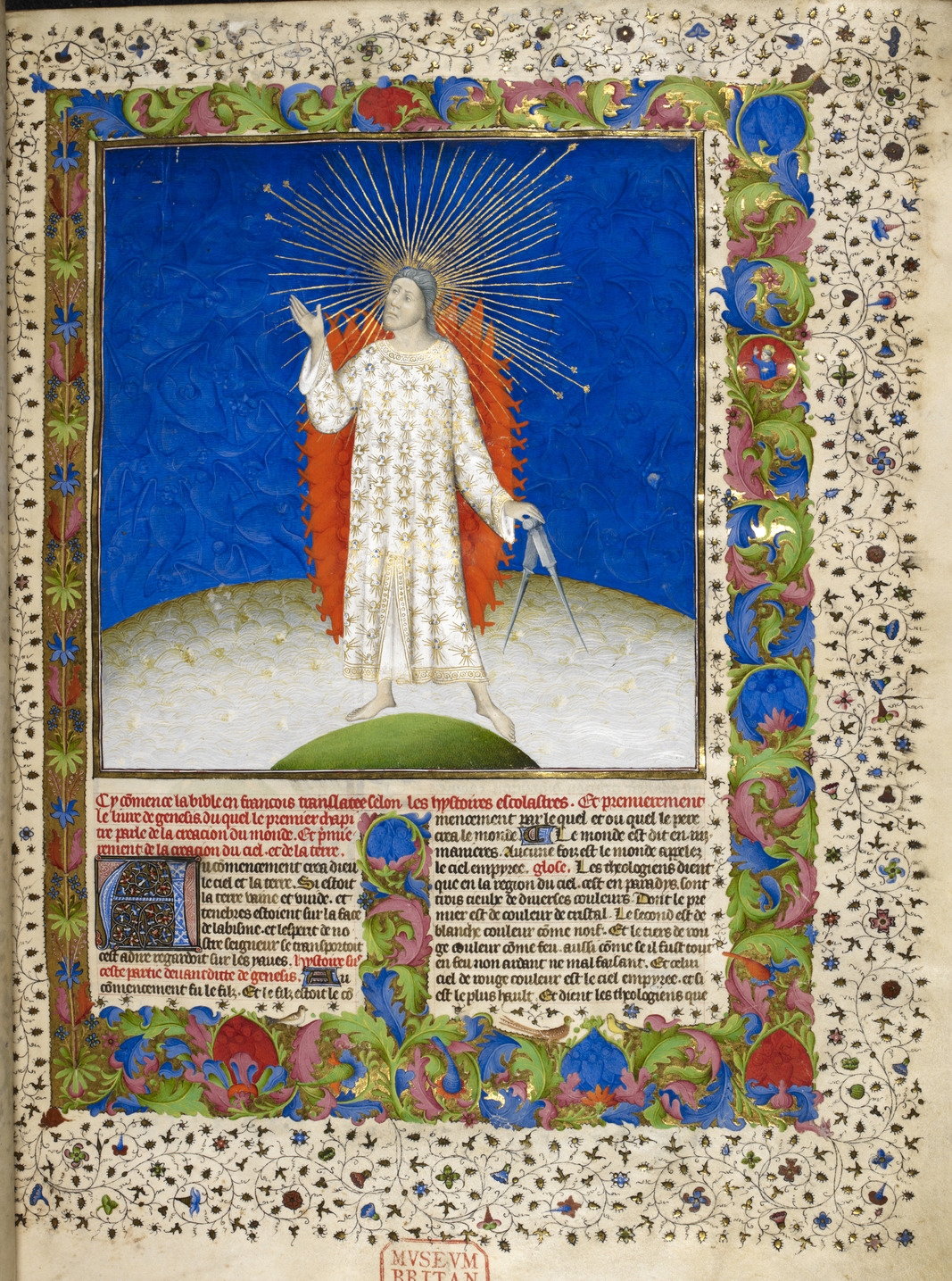
The Creation – Bible Historiale (c. 1411)

And God said, "Let there be lights in the dome of the sky to separate the day from the night, and let them be for signs and for seasons and for days and years, and let them be lights in the dome of the sky to give light upon the earth." And it was so. God made the two great lights—the greater light to rule the day and the lesser light to rule the night—and the stars. God set them in the dome of the sky to give light upon the earth, to rule over the day and over the night, and to separate the light from the darkness. And God saw that it was good. And there was evening and there was morning, the fourth day.

— Genesis 1:14–19 (NRSVue)

On the first day, God makes light ('ôr). On the fourth day, God makes "lights" or "lamps" (mā'ôr) set in the firmament. This is the same word used elsewhere in the Pentateuch for the lampstand or menorah in the Tabernacle, another reference to the cosmos being a temple. Specifically, God creates the "greater light", the "lesser light", and the stars. According to Victor Hamilton, most scholars agree that the choice of the wording "greater light" and "lesser light", rather than the more explicit terms "sun" and "moon", is anti-mythological rhetoric intended to contradict widespread contemporary beliefs in sun and moon deities. Indeed, Rashi posits that the account of the fourth day reveals that the Sun and the Moon operate only according to the will of God, and so demonstrates that it is foolish to worship them.

The account of the fourth day introduces the language of "ruling". The heavenly bodies will "govern" day and night and mark seasons, years and days. This was a matter of crucial importance to the Priestly authors, as the three pilgrimage festivals were organised around the cycles of both the Sun and Moon in a lunisolar calendar that could have either 12 or 13 months.

In Genesis 1:17, God sets the stars in the firmament. In Babylonian myth, the heavens were made of various precious stones with the stars engraved in their surface (compare Exodus 24:10 where the elders of Israel see God on the sapphire floor of heaven).

==== Fifth day (1:20–23) ====
And God said, "Let the waters bring forth swarms of living creatures, and let birds fly above the earth across the dome of the sky." So God created the great sea monsters and every living creature that moves, of every kind, with which the waters swarm and every winged bird of every kind. And God saw that it was good. God blessed them, saying, "Be fruitful and multiply and fill the waters in the seas, and let birds multiply on the earth." And there was evening and there was morning, the fifth day.

— Genesis 1:20–23 (NRSVue)

On the fifth day, God creates animals of the sea and air. In Genesis 1:20, the Hebrew term nepeš ḥayya ('living creatures') is first used. They are of higher status than all that has been created before this, and they receive God's blessing.

The Hebrew word tannin (translated as "sea creatures" or "sea monsters") in Genesis 1:21 is used elsewhere in the Bible in reference to chaos-monsters named Rahab and Leviathan (Psalm 74:13, Isaiah 27:1 and 51:9). In the Egyptian Instruction of Merikare and Mesopotamian Enuma Elish, the creator-god has to do battle with the sea-monsters before he can make heaven and earth. In Genesis, however, there is no hint of combat, and the tannin are simply creatures created by God. The Genesis account, therefore, is an explicit polemic against the mythologies of the ancient world.

==== Sixth day (1:24–31) ====
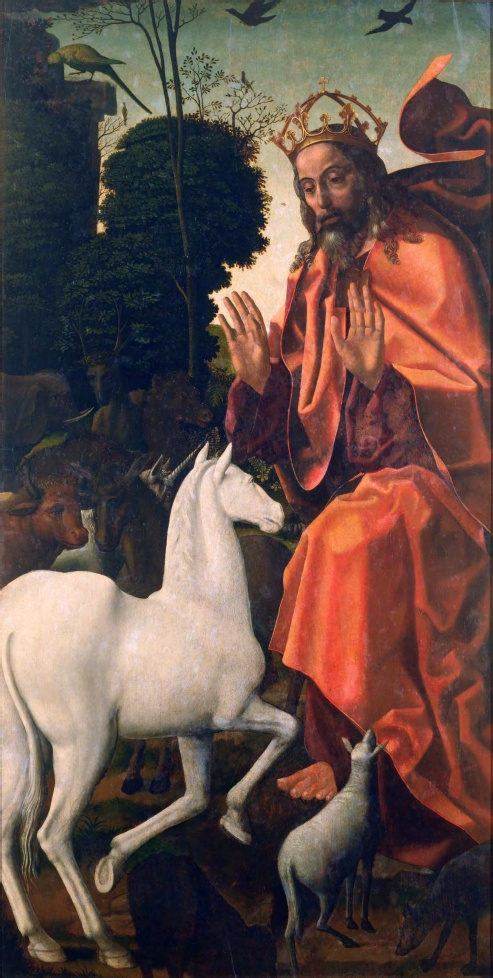
The Creation of the Animals (1506–1511), by Grão Vasco

And God said, "Let the earth bring forth living creatures of every kind: cattle and creeping things and wild animals of the earth of every kind." And it was so. God made the wild animals of the earth of every kind and the cattle of every kind and everything that creeps upon the ground of every kind. And God saw that it was good.

Then God said, "Let us make humans in our image, according to our likeness, and let them have dominion over the fish of the sea and over the birds of the air and over the cattle and over all the wild animals of the earth and over every creeping thing that creeps upon the earth."

So God created humans in his image,
in the image of God he created them;
male and female he created them.

God blessed them, and God said to them, "Be fruitful and multiply and fill the earth and subdue it and have dominion over the fish of the sea and over the birds of the air and over every living thing that moves upon the earth." God said, "See, I have given you every plant yielding seed that is upon the face of all the earth and every tree with seed in its fruit; you shall have them for food. And to every beast of the earth and to every bird of the air and to everything that creeps on the earth, everything that has the breath of life, I have given every green plant for food." And it was so. God saw everything that he had made, and indeed, it was very good. And there was evening and there was morning, the sixth day.

— Genesis 1:24–31 (NRSVue)

On the sixth day, God creates land animals and humans. Like the animals of the sea and air, the land animals are designated nepeš ḥayya ('living creatures'). They are divided into three categories: domesticated animals (behema), wild herd animals that serve as prey (remeś), and wild predators (ḥayya). The earth "brings forth" animals in the same way that it brought forth vegetation on day three.

In Genesis 1:26, God says "Let us make man ..." This has given rise to several theories, of which the two most important are that "us" is majestic plural, or that it reflects a setting in a divine council with God enthroned as king and proposing the creation of mankind to the lesser divine beings. A traditional interpretation is that "us" refers to a plurality of persons in the Godhead, which reflects Trinitarianism. Some justify this by stating that the plural reveals a "duality within the Godhead" that recalls the "Spirit of God" mentioned in verse 2; "And the Spirit of God moved upon the face of the waters".

The creation of mankind is the climax of the creation account and God's implied purpose for creating the world. Everything created up to this point was made for humanity's use. Man was created in the "image of God". The meaning of this is unclear but suggestions include:

1. Having the spiritual qualities of God such as intellect, will, etc.;
2. Having the physical form of God;
3. A combination of these two;
4. Being God's counterpart on Earth and able to enter into a relationship with him;
5. Being God's representative or viceroy on Earth;
6. Having dominion over Creation like the angels in Psalm 8:5;
7. Moral excellence and the possibility of glorification.

When in Genesis 1:26 God says "Let us make man", the Hebrew word used is adam; in this form it is a generic noun, "mankind", and does not imply that this creation is male. After this first mention the word always appears as ha-adam, 'the man', but as Genesis 1:27 shows ("So God created man in his [own] image, in the image of God created He him; male and female created He them."), the word is still not exclusively male.

God blesses humanity, commanding them to reproduce, 'subdue' (kbš) the earth and 'rule' (rdh) over it, in what is known as the cultural mandate. Humanity is to extend the Kingdom of God beyond Eden, and, imitating the Creator-God, is to labour to bring the earth into its service, to the end of the fulfilment of the mandate. This would include the procreation of offspring, the subjugation and replenishment of the earth (e.g., the use of natural resources), dominion over creatures (e.g., animal domestication), labor in general, and marriage. God tells the animals and humans that he has given them "the green plants for food" – creation is to be vegetarian. Only later, after the Flood, is man given permission to eat flesh. The Priestly author of Genesis appears to look back to an ideal past in which mankind lived at peace both with itself and with the animal kingdom, and which could be re-achieved through a proper sacrificial life in harmony with God.

Upon completion, God sees that "every thing that He had made ... was very good". According to Israel Knohl, this implies that the materials that existed before the Creation (tohu wa-bohu, "darkness", tehom) were not "very good". He thus hypothesized that the Priestly source set up this dichotomy to mitigate the problem of evil. However, according to Collins, since the creation of man is the climax of the first creation account, "very good" must signify the presentation of man as the crown of God's creation, which is to serve him.

In Catholic exegesis, God's view that everything created was "very good" implies that "all those things which make up the temporal order, namely, the good things of life and the prosperity of the family, culture, economic matters, the arts and professions, the laws of the political community, international relations, and other matters of this kind, as well as their development and progress, not only aid in the attainment of man's ultimate goal but also possess their own intrinsic value. This value has been established in them by God, whether they are considered in themselves or as parts of the whole temporal order."

=== Seventh day: divine rest (2:1–4a) ===
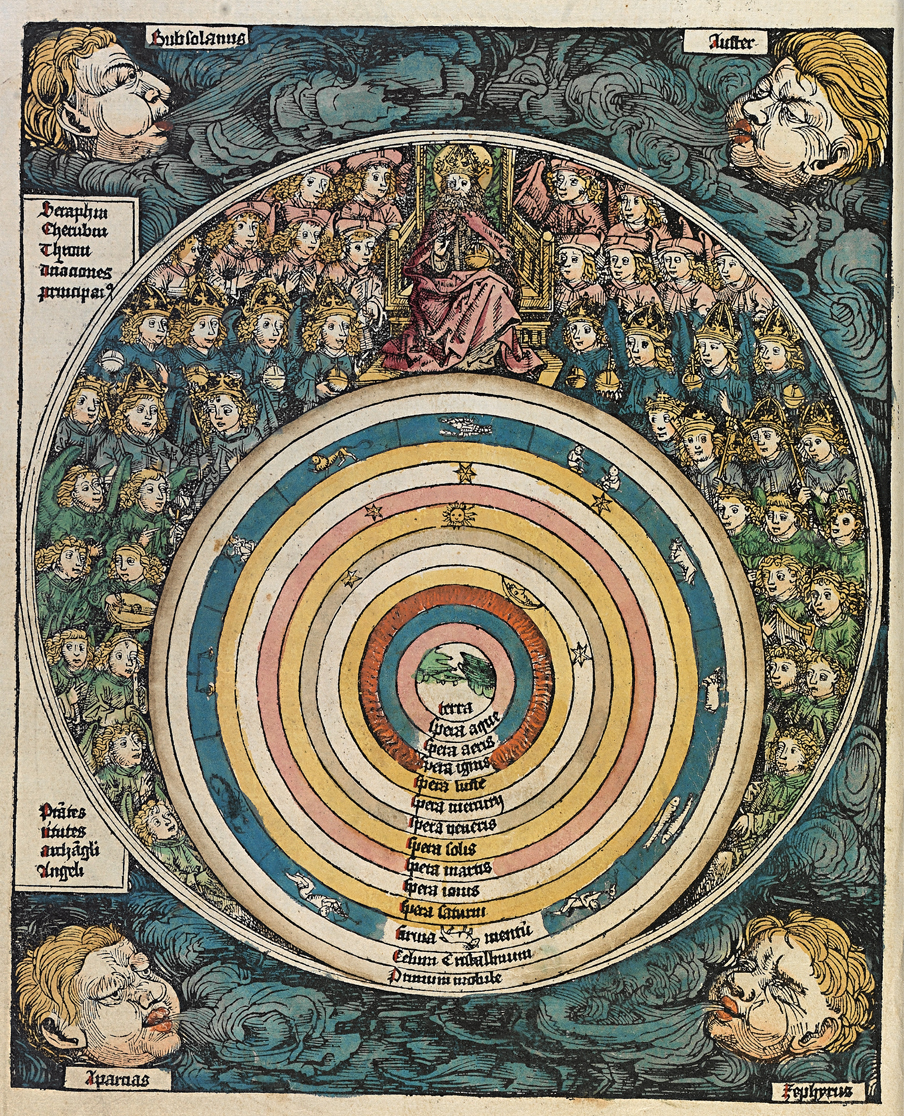
Seventh Day of Creation, from the 1493 Nuremberg Chronicle by Hartmann Schedel

Thus the heavens and the earth were finished and all their multitude. On the sixth day God finished the work that he had done, and he rested on the seventh day from all the work that he had done. So God blessed the seventh day and hallowed it, because on it God rested from all the work that he had done in creation.

These are the generations of the heavens and the earth when they were created.

— Genesis 2:1–4a (NRSVue)

These verses belong with and complete the narrative in chapter 1. Creation is followed by "rest". In ancient Near Eastern literature, the divine rest is achieved in a temple as a result of having brought order to chaos. Rest is both disengagement, as the work of creation is finished, but also engagement, as the deity is now present in his temple to maintain a secure and ordered cosmos. The word used in the original Hebrew Texts that has been translated as "rested" is "way·yiš·bōṯ". This word is used only twice in the Old Testament, the other occurrence being Joshua 5:12. In Joshua 5:12, the word is not used to indicate a temporary suspension but a permanent cessation:

And the manna ceased on the morrow after they had eaten of the old corn of the land; neither had the children of Israel manna any more; but they did eat of the fruit of the land of Canaan that year.

— Joshua 5:12.

Compare with Exodus 20:8–11: "Remember the sabbath day, to keep it holy. Six days shalt thou labour, and do all thy work; but the seventh day is a sabbath unto the LORD thy GOD, in it thou shalt not do any manner of work, thou, nor thy son, nor thy daughter, nor thy man-servant, nor thy maid-servant, nor thy cattle, nor thy stranger that is within thy gates; for in six days the LORD made heaven and earth, the sea, and all that in them is, and rested on the seventh day; wherefore the LORD blessed the sabbath day, and hallowed it."

== Second narrative: Genesis 2:4b–25 ==
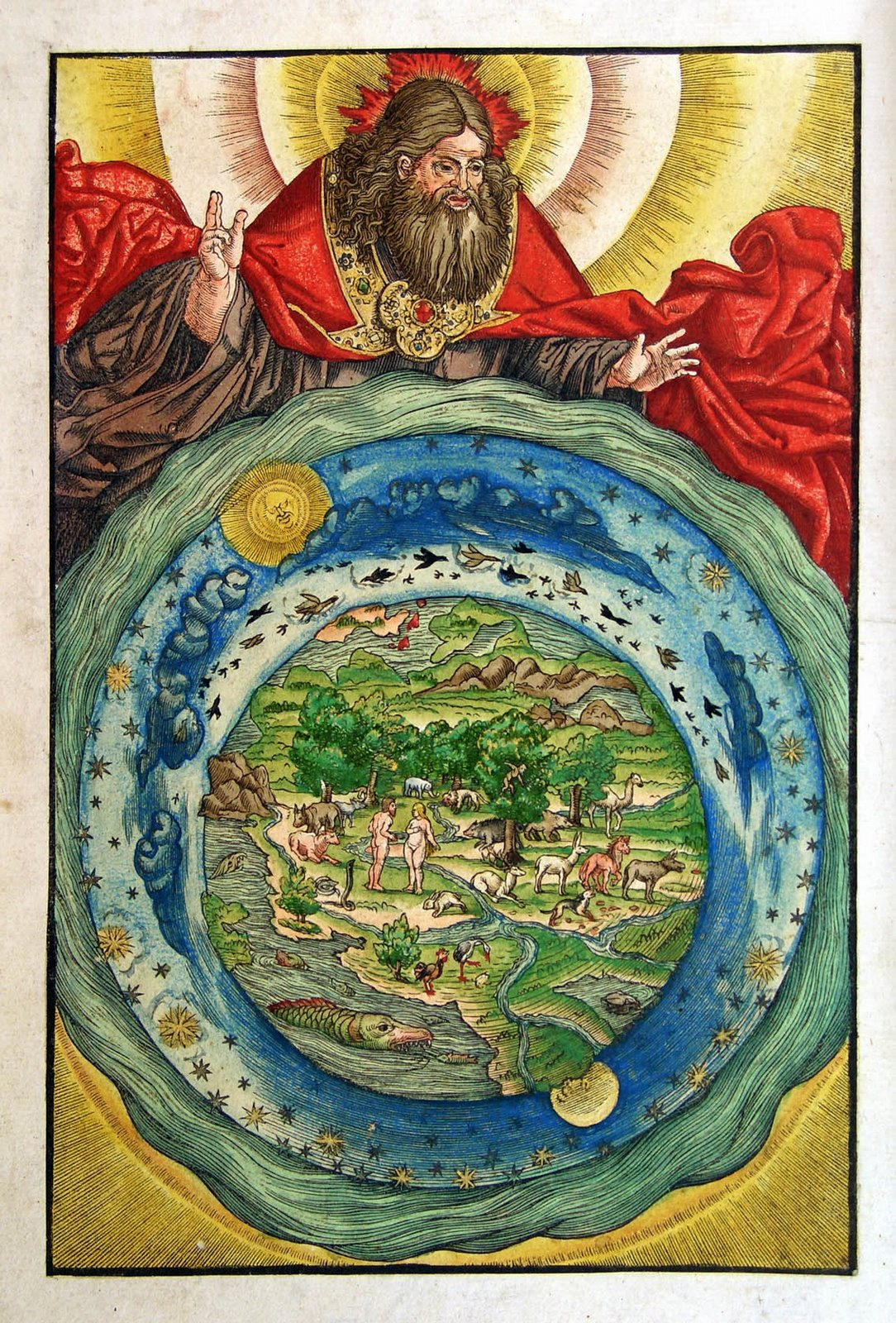
The Creation by Lucas Cranach the Elder, 1534

The Garden of Eden story, which occupies the remainder of Genesis 2, was probably authored c. 500 BC as "a discourse on ideals in life, the danger in human glory, and the fundamentally ambiguous nature of humanity – especially human mental faculties". The Garden in which the action takes place lies on the mythological border between the human and the divine worlds, probably on the far side of the cosmic ocean near the rim of the world; following a conventional ancient Near Eastern concept, the Eden river first forms that ocean and then divides into four rivers which run from the four corners of the earth towards its centre. According to Meredith Kline, who represents covenant theology and the framework interpretation, the narrative establishes the site of the "climactic probation test", which is also where the "covenant crisis" of Genesis 3 occurs.

The pericope that constitutes the second narrative is usually analysed as beginning with Genesis 2:4b ("In the day that the LORD God made the earth and the heavens"). A minority position interprets the whole of Genesis 2:4 as being one self-contained unit, largely consisting of a chiasmus with the structure:

These are the generations
(a) of the heavens
(b) and of the earth
(c) when they were created
(c′) in the day that the LORD God made
(b′) the earth
(a′) and the heavens.

=== Origin of humanity and plant life (2:4b–7) ===
Genesis 2:4b is a set introduction, similar to those found in Babylonian myths. Before the man is created, the earth is a barren waste watered by an 'êḏ (אד). The King James Version has the translation "mist" for this word, following Jewish practice – since the mid-20th century, Hebraists have generally accepted the real meaning as being "spring of underground water".

In Genesis 1 the characteristic word for God's activity is bara, 'created'; in Genesis 2 the word used when he creates the man is yatsar (ייצר yîṣer), 'fashioned', a word used in contexts such as a potter fashioning a pot from clay. God breathes his own breath into the clay and it becomes nephesh (נֶ֫פֶשׁ), a word meaning 'life', 'vitality', "the living personality"; man shares nephesh with all creatures, but the text describes this life-giving act by God only in relation to man.

=== Garden of Eden (2:8–14) ===
The word "Eden" comes from a root meaning "fertility": the first man is to work in God's miraculously fertile garden. The tree of life is a motif from Mesopotamian myth; in the Epic of Gilgamesh (c. 1800 BC) (Note: "The story of Adam and Eve's sin in the garden of Eden (2.25–3.24) displays similarities with Gilgamesh, an epic poem that tells of how its hero lost the opportunity for immortality and came to terms with his humanity. ... the biblical narrator has adapted the Mesopotamian forerunner to Israelite theology" (Levenson 2004, p. 9).) the hero is given a plant whose name is "man becomes young in old age", but a serpent steals the plant from him. Kline regards the tree of life as a symbol or seal of the reward of eternal life for successful fulfilment of the covenant by humanity. What type of knowledge is given by the second tree has been subject to much scholarly discussion: suggestions include human qualities, sexual consciousness, ethical knowledge, and universal knowledge, with the latter interpretation being most widely accepted. In Eden, mankind has a choice between wisdom and life, and chooses the first, although God intended them for the second.

The mythic Eden and its rivers may represent the real Jerusalem, the Temple and the Promised Land. Eden may represent the divine garden on Zion, the mountain of God, which was also Jerusalem; while the real Gihon was a spring outside the city (mirroring the spring which waters Eden); and the imagery of the Garden, with its serpent and cherubs, has been seen as a reflection of the real images of Solomon's Temple, with its copper serpent (the nehushtan) and guardian cherubim. Genesis 2 is the only place in the Bible where Eden appears as a geographic location: elsewhere (notably in the Book of Ezekiel) it is a mythological place located on the holy Mountain of God, with echoes of a Mesopotamian myth of the king as a primordial man placed in a divine garden to guard the tree of life "in the midst of the garden" (verse 9).

=== God's covenant with Adam (2:15–17) ===
Kline states that the terms of the covenant (a divine legal transaction with divinely sanctioned commitments), specifically the Covenant of Works, are summarised in verses 15–17. In verse 15, humanity is to "dress" and "keep" the garden (KJV), or to "work it" and "take care of it" (NIV). In verse 17, God gives the "focal probationary proscription", that Adam must not eat of the tree of the knowledge of good and evil, which refers to "judicial discernment" and a curse is attached if the proscription is transgressed, which is said to be death, although Kline interprets this to be spiritual death or eternal perdition rather than physical death. The Hebrew behind this is in the form used in the Bible for issuing death sentences. "Good and evil" can also be interpreted as a merism, which would refer simply to knowledge of all things.

=== Creation of woman (2:18–25) ===
After God's observation that it is "not good that man should be alone" in verse 18, but before he causes Adam to sleep, then creating the woman from his side in verses 21–22, Adam's first recorded action is carried out alone, his naming of each of the other creatures brought to him by God. This appears to be an exercise of the authority and the dominion given to Adam in Genesis 1:28. Verse 20 also states that, among all the animals, none was found to be a suitable helper for him, which leads into the account of the creation of the woman (named Eve in the following chapter).

The first woman is "built" out of one of Adam's ribs, to be an ezer kenegdo (עזר כנגדו 'êzer kəneḡdō) for him – a phrase that is particularly difficult to translate. Kəneḡdō means 'alongside', 'opposite', or 'a counterpart to him', and 'êzer refers to active intervention on behalf of the other person. God's naming of the elements of the cosmos in Genesis 1 illustrated his authority over creation; the man's naming of the animals illustrates Adam's authority within creation. The woman is called ishah (אשה 'iš-šāh), 'woman', with an explanation that this is because she was taken from ish (אִישׁ 'îš), 'man', but the two words are not connected. Adam rejoices at being given a helper, exclaiming (or singing) that she is "bone of my bones and flesh of my flesh". Henri Blocher refers to Adam's words as "poetry"; Alistair Wilson proposes that they should be treated as song.

Following the Eden narrative, in Genesis 3 the woman receives the name Ḥawwāh (חוה, Eve). This means 'living' in Hebrew, from a root that can also mean 'snake'. Assyriologist Samuel Noah Kramer connects Eve's creation to the ancient Sumerian myth of Enki, who was healed by the goddess Nin-ti, "the Lady of the rib"; this became "the Lady who makes live" via a pun on the word ti, which means both 'rib' and 'to make live' in Sumerian. The Hebrew word traditionally translated 'rib' in English can also mean 'side', 'chamber', or 'beam'. A long-standing exegetical tradition holds that the use of a rib from man's side emphasises that both man and woman have equal dignity, for woman was created from the same material as man, shaped and given life by the same processes.

== Interpretations ==
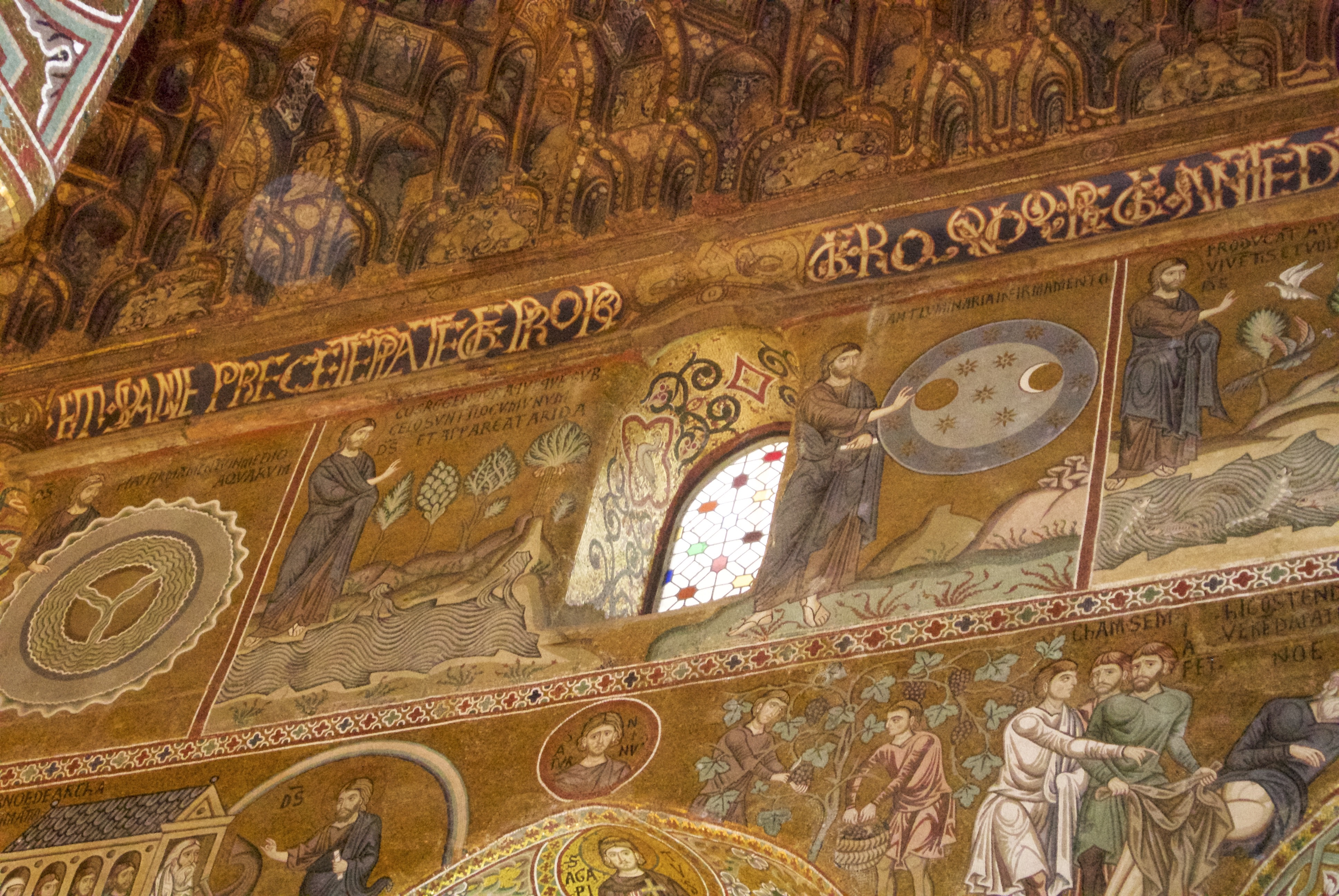
12th-century mosaic of the Genesis creation narrative in the Cappella Palatina in Palermo, Italy

=== Hexameral literature ===
The Genesis creation narrative inspired a genre of Jewish and Christian literature known as the Hexameral literature. This literature was dedicated to the composition of commentaries, homilies, and treatises concerned with the exegesis of the biblical creation narrative through ancient and medieval times. The first Christian example of this genre was the Hexaemeron of the 4th-century theologian Basil of Caesarea, and many other works went on to be written by authors including Augustine of Hippo, Jacob of Serugh, Jacob of Edessa, and Bonaventure.

=== Framework interpretation ===
The framework interpretation (also known as the "literary framework" view, "framework theory", or "framework hypothesis") is a description of the structure of the first creation narrative (more precisely, Genesis 1:1–2:4a). Biblical scholars and theologians present the structure as evidence that the first creation narrative constitutes a symbolic rather than literal presentation of creation.

==== Two triads and three kingdoms ====
Kline's analysis divides the six days of creation in Genesis into two groups of three ("triads"). The introduction, Genesis 1:1–2, "In the beginning... the earth was without form and void, and darkness was upon the face of the deep...", describes the primal universe containing darkness, a watery "deep", and a formless earth, over which hovers the spirit of God. The following three days describe the first triad: the creation of light and its separation from the primal darkness (Genesis 1:3–5); the creation of the "firmament" within the primal waters so that the heavens (space between the firmament and the surface of the seas) and the "waters under the firmament" can appear (Genesis 1:6–8); and the separation of the waters under the firmament into seas and dry land with its plants and trees. The second triad describes the peopling of the three elements of the first: sun, moon, and stars for the day and night (Genesis 1:14–19), fish and birds for the heavens and seas (Genesis 1:20–23), and finally animals and man for the vegetated land (24–31). This framework is illustrated in the following table.

First triad — creation kingdoms		Second triad — creature kinds	
Day 1 (Light)	Let there be light (1:3).	Let there be lights (1:14).	Day 4 (Luminaries)
Day 2 (Sky/Water)	Let there be a firmament in the midst of the waters, and let it divide the waters from the waters (1:6).	Let the water teem with creatures and let birds fly above the earth (1:20).	Day 5 (birds/fish)
Day 3 (Land/Vegetation)	Let dry land appear (1:9). Let the land produce vegetation (1:11).	Let the land produce living creatures (1:24). Let us make man (1:26). I give you every seed bearing plant ... and every tree that has fruit with seed in it ... for food (1:29).	Day 6 (land animals/humans)
The Creator King
Day 7 (Sabbath)

Differences exist in classifying the two triads, but Kline's analysis is suggestive: the first triad (days 1–3) narrates the establishment of the creation kingdoms, and the second triad (days 4–6), the production of the creature kinds. Furthermore, this structure is not without theological significance, for all the created realms and regents of the six days are subordinate vassals of God, who takes his royal Sabbath rest as the Creator on the seventh day. Thus, the seventh day marks the climax of the creation week.

==== Supporters and critics ====
The framework interpretation is held by many theistic evolutionists and some progressive creationists. Some argue that it has a precedent in the writings of Augustine of Hippo. Arie Noordzij of the University of Utrecht was the first proponent of the Framework Hypothesis in 1924. Nicolaas Ridderbos (not to be confused with his more well-known brother, Herman Nicolaas Ridderbos) popularized the view in the late 1950s. It has gained acceptance in modern times through the work of such theologians and scholars as Meredith G. Kline, Henri Blocher, John H. Walton and Bruce Waltke. Old Testament and Pentateuch scholar Gordon Wenham supports a schematic interpretation of Genesis 1:

It has been unfortunate that one device which our narrative uses to express the coherence and purposiveness of the creator's work, namely, the distribution of the various creative acts to six days, has been seized on and interpreted over-literalistically ... The six day schema is but one of several means employed in this chapter to stress the system and order that has been built into creation. Other devices include the use of repeating formulae, the tendency to group words and phrases into tens and sevens, literary techniques such as chiasm and inclusio, the arrangement of creative acts into matching groups, and so on. If these hints were not sufficient to indicate the schematization of the six-day creation story, the very content of the narrative points in the same direction.

The framework view has been successful in the modern era because it is seen as a resolution of the traditional conflict between the Genesis creation narrative and contemporary science. It presents an alternative to literalist interpretations of the Genesis narratives, which are advocated by some conservative Christians and creationists at a popular level. Creationists who take a literalist approach reject symbolic or allegorical interpretations of the Genesis creation narrative as conceding to scientific authority at the expense of biblical authority. Advocates of the framework view respond by noting that scripture affirms God's general revelation in nature (see Psalm 19; Romans 1:19–20); therefore, in the search for the truth about the origins of the universe, we must be sensitive to both the "book of words" (scripture) and the "book of works" (nature). Since God is the author of both "books", we should expect that they do not conflict with each other when properly interpreted.

Opponents of the framework interpretation include Old Testament scholars James Barr and Andrew Steinmann, Robert McCabe, and Ting Wang. Additionally, some conservative systematic theologians, such as Wayne Grudem and Millard Erickson, have criticised the framework interpretation, deeming it an unsuitable reading of the Genesis text. Grudem states that "while the 'framework' view does not deny the truthfulness of scripture, it adopts an interpretation of scripture which, upon closer inspection, seems very unlikely."

=== Literal interpretations ===
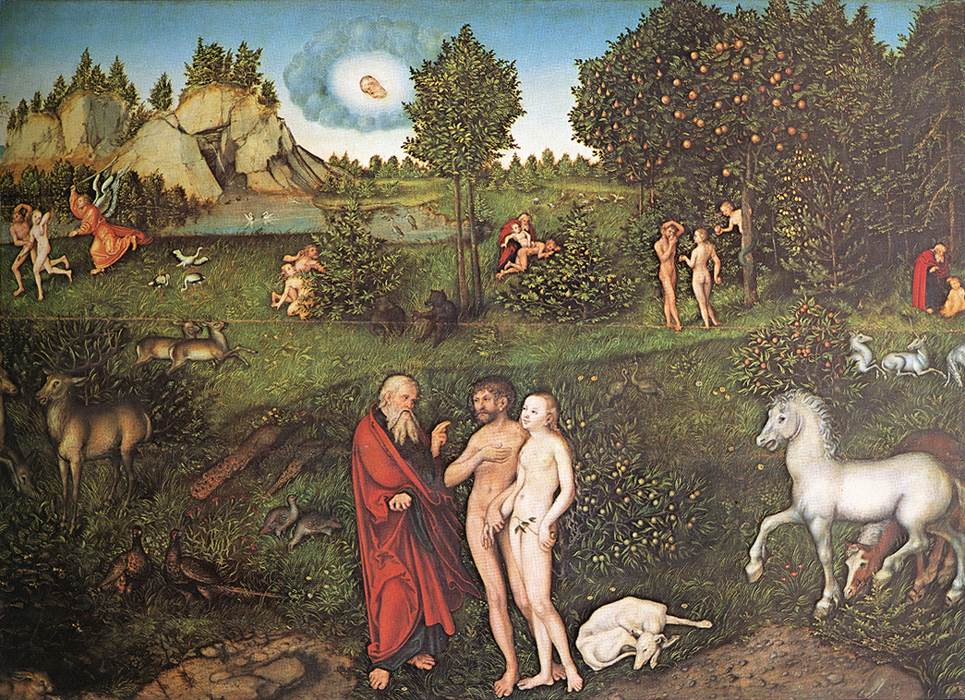
Eden by Lucas Cranach the Elder, 1472–1553

The meaning to be derived from the Genesis creation narrative will depend on the reader's understanding of its genre, the literary "type" to which it belongs (e.g., creation myth, historical saga, or scientific cosmology).

While biblical criticism has deconstructed many traditional views on the Bible, conservative evangelical traditions have tended to interpret the Genesis creation narrative in a literal way but have also engaged in (sometimes heated) disputes on the interpretation of Genesis.

According to biblical scholar Francis Andersen, misunderstanding the intention of the authors and the culture within which they wrote will result in a misreading. Reformed and evangelical scholar Bruce Waltke cautions against one such misreading: the "woodenly literal" approach, which leads to "creation science", but also to such "implausible interpretations" as the "gap theory", the presumption of a "young Earth", and the denial of evolution. Scholar of Jewish studies Jon D. Levenson goes further in doubting whether historicity can be attributed to Genesis at all:

How much history lies behind the story of Genesis? Because the action of the primeval story is not represented as taking place on the plane of ordinary human history and has so many affinities with ancient mythology, it is very far-fetched to speak of its narratives as historical at all.

Historian Conrad Hyers likewise wrote: "A literalist interpretation of the Genesis accounts is inappropriate, misleading, and unworkable [because] it presupposes and insists upon a kind of literature and intention that is not there." Nonetheless, according to John Day, there is no reason to say that the authors of Genesis 1 did not believe that it happened as presented. The creation story matches other ancient near eastern structures of the cosmos, and is etiological, so positing poetry and metaphor does not necessarily have to be the case.

Biblical scholar John J. Collins argues that trying to harmonize the relation between modern sciences and Genesis does a disservice to the Bible. He considered it no better to force any contemporary and alien understandings onto the texts, especially when they conceived of the world in a totally different way.

== See also ==
- Adapa
- Anno Mundi
- Apollo 8 Genesis reading
- Allegorical interpretations of Genesis
- Chronology of the Bible
- Christian mythology
- Rejection of evolution by religious groups
- Eridu Genesis
- Islamic mythology
- List of creation myths
- Ningishzida
- Sanamahi creation myth
- Sumerian literature
- Theistic evolution
- Tower of Babel

== Sources ==
- Alter, Robert (1981). The Art of Biblical narrative. Basic Books. ISBN 978-0-465-00427-0.
- Alter, Robert (2004). The Five Books of Moses. W. W. Norton. ISBN 0-393-33393-0.
- Andersen, Francis I. (1987). "On Reading Genesis 1–3". In O'Connor, Michael Patrick; Freedman, David Noel (eds.). Backgrounds for the Bible. Eisenbrauns. ISBN 978-0-931464-30-0.
- Arnold, Bill T. (1998). Encountering the Book of Genesis: A Study of Its Content and Issues. Encountering Biblical Studies. Grand Rapids, Michigan: Baker. ISBN 978-1-58558-539-7.
- Aune, David E. (2003). "Cosmology". Westminster Dictionary of the New Testament and Early Christian Literature. Westminster John Knox Press. ISBN 978-0-664-21917-8.
- Baden, Joel S. (2012). The Composition of the Pentateuch: Renewing the Documentary Hypothesis. Anchor Yale Reference Library. Yale University Press. ISBN 978-0-300-15264-7.
- Bandstra, Barry L. (2008). Reading the Old Testament: An Introduction to the Hebrew Bible. Wadsworth. p. 576. ISBN 978-0-495-39105-0.
- Batten, Don; Catchpoole, David; Sarfati, Jonathan D.; Wieland, Carl (24 February 2025) [30 November 2007]. "Is Genesis poetry/figurative, a theological argument (polemic) and thus not history?". Creation Answers Book. Creation.
- Berry, R. J. (2003). God's book of works: the nature and theology of nature. Edinburgh: T&T Clark. ISBN 0-567-08915-0.
- Blenkinsopp, Joseph (2011). Creation, Un-Creation, Re-Creation: A Discursive Commentary on Genesis 1–11. T&T Clarke. ISBN 978-0-567-37287-1.
- Blocher, Henri (1984). In the Beginning: The Opening Chapters of Genesis. InterVarsity. ISBN 978-0-87784-325-2.
- Bouteneff, Peter C. (2008). Beginnings: Ancient Christian Readings of the Biblical Creation Narrative. Grand Rapids, Michigan: Baker. ISBN 978-0-8010-3233-2.
- Carey, Gary; Snodgrass, Mary Ellen (1999). A Multicultural Dictionary of Literary Terms. Jefferson: McFarland. ISBN 0-7864-0552-X.
- Carr, David M. (1996). Reading the Fractures in Genesis. Westminster John Knox Press. ISBN 0-664-22071-1.
- Coats, George W. (1983). Genesis, with an Introduction to Narrative Literature. William B. Eerdmans.
- Collins, C. John (2006). Genesis 1–4: a linguistic, literary, and theological commentary. Phillipsburg, New Jersey: P&R.
- Collins, John J. (2018). Introduction to the Hebrew Bible (3rd ed.). Minneapolis: Fortress. ISBN 978-1-5064-4598-4.
- Coogan, Michael D.; Chapman, Cynthia R. (2018). The Old Testament: A Historical and Literary Introduction to the Hebrew Scriptures (4th ed.). Oxford University Press. ISBN 978-0-19-060865-1.
- Cotter, David W. (2003). Genesis. Liturgical. ISBN 978-0-8146-5040-0.
- Cross, Frank Moore (1973). "The Priestly Work". Canaanite Myth and Hebrew Epic: Essays in the History of the Religion of Israel. Harvard University Press. p. 394. ISBN 0-674-09176-0.
- Daryl Charles, J. (2013). "Introduction". In Daryl Charles, J. (ed.). Reading Genesis 1–2: An Evangelical Conversation. Hendrickson.
- Davidson, Robert (1973). Genesis 1–11. Cambridge University Press. ISBN 978-0-521-09760-4.
- Davies, G. I. (2001). "Introduction to the Pentateuch". In Barton, John; Muddiman, John (eds.). Oxford Bible Commentary. Oxford University Press. doi:10.1093/acref/9780198755005.001.0001. ISBN 978-0-19-927718-6.
- Day, John (2014). "The Meaning and Background of the Priestly Creation Story (Genesis 1.1-2.4a)". From Creation to Babel: Studies in Genesis 1-11. Bloomsbury. ISBN 978-0-567-37030-3.
- Day, John (2021). "Genesis 1.1-5: The First Day of Creation". From Creation to Abraham: Further Studies in Genesis 1-11. Bloomsbury. ISBN 978-0-567-70311-8.
- Deretic, Irina (2020). "Why are myths true: Plato on the veracity of myths". Philosophy and Conflict Studies. 36 (3). Vestnik of Saint Petersburg University: 441–451.
- Dolansky, Shawna (2016). "The Multiple Truths of Myths". Biblical Archaeology Review. 42 (1): 18, 60. Archived from the original on 31 January 2016.
- Ehrman, Bart (2021). "Two (Contradictory?) Accounts of Creation in Genesis?".
- Ehrman, Bart (2024). "The Book of Genesis: Summary, Authorship, and Dating".
- Erickson, Millard J. (1998). Christian theology. Grand Rapids, Michigan: Baker Book House. pp. 407–408. ISBN 0-8010-2182-0.
- Fishbane, Michael (2003). Biblical Myth and Rabbinic Mythmaking. Oxford University Press. ISBN 0-19-826733-9.
- Friedman, Richard Elliott; Dolansky Overton, Shawna (2007). "Pentateuch". In Skolnik, Fred; Berenbaum, Michael; Thomson Gale (Firm) (eds.). Encyclopaedia Judaica. Vol. 15 (2nd ed.). p. 734. ISBN 978-0-02-865943-5. OCLC 774684287.
- Futato, Mark (Spring 1998). "Because it Had Rained: A Study of Genesis 2:5–7 With Implications for Genesis 2:4–25 and Genesis 1:1–2:3" (PDF). Westminster Theological Journal. 60 (1). Gordon: 1–21. Archived from the original (PDF) on 28 September 2021. Reprinted in "Part 1". Reformed Perspectives Magazine. Third mill. and part 2.
- Galambush, Julie (2000). "Eve". In Freedman, David Noel; Myers, Allen C. (eds.). Eerdmans Dictionary of the Bible. Grand Rapids, Michigan: William B. Eerdmans. ISBN 978-9-0535-6503-2.
- Garr, John D. (2012). Coequal and Counterbalanced. Golden Key. ISBN 978-0-9794514-9-2.
- Gmirkin, Russell E. (2006). Berossus and Genesis, Manetho and Exodus. Bloomsbury. ISBN 978-0-567-13439-4.
- Grudem, Wayne (2020). Systematic Theology, Second Edition. Zondervan Academic. p. 408. ISBN 978-0-310-51797-9. "In conclusion, while the 'framework' view does not deny the truthfulness of Scripture, it adopts an interpretation of Scripture which, upon closer inspection, seems very unlikely."
- Hamilton, Victor P (1990). The Book of Genesis: Chapters 1–17. New International Commentary on the Old Testament (NICOT). Grand Rapids, Michigan: William B. Eerdmans. p. 540. ISBN 0-8028-2521-4.
- Harmon, William (2012). A Handbook to Literature (12th ed.). Boston: Longman. ISBN 978-0-205-02401-8.
- Hastings, James (2003). Encyclopedia of Religion and Ethics, Part 10. Kessinger. ISBN 978-0-7661-3682-3.
- Hayes, Christine (2012). Introduction to the Bible. Yale University Press. ISBN 978-0-300-18827-1.
- Hugenberger, G. P. (1988). "Rib". In Bromiley, Geoffrey W. (ed.). The International Standard Bible Encyclopedia. Vol. 4. Eerdmans. ISBN 978-0-8028-3784-4.
- Hutton, Jeremy (2007). "Isaiah 51:9–11 and the Rhetorical Appropriation and Subversion of Hostile Theologies". Journal of Biblical Literature. 126 (2). Society of Biblical Literature: 271–303. JSTOR 27638435.
- Hyers, Conrad (1984). The Meaning of Creation: Genesis and Modern Science. Westminster John Knox Press. ISBN 978-0-8042-0125-4.
- Irons, Lee (January 2000). "The Framework Interpretation: An Exegetical Summary". Ordained Servant. 9 (1). Upper register: 7–11.
- ———; Kline, Meredith G (2000). "The Framework Interpretation". In Hagopian, David G. (ed.). The Genesis Debate: Three Views on the "Days" of Creation. Global Publishing Services. ISBN 978-0-9702245-0-7.
- Jacobs, Mignon R. (2007). Gender, Power, and Persuasion: The Genesis Narratives and Contemporary Perspectives. Baker. ISBN 978-0-8010-2706-2.
- Kaiser, Christopher B. (1997). Creational Theology and the History of Physical Science. Brill. ISBN 90-04-10669-3.
- Katsos, Isidoros (2023). The Metaphysics of Light in the Hexaemeral Literature: From Philo of Alexandria to Gregory of Nyssa. Oxford University Press.
- Kissling, Paul (2004). Genesis, Volume 1. College Press. ISBN 978-0-89900-875-2.
- Klamm, Kacie; Winitzer, Abraham (2023). "Mesopotamian Mythology and Genesis 1–11". Oxford Bibliographies. Biblical Studies. doi:10.1093/obo/9780195393361-0321. ISBN 978-0-19-539336-1.
- Kline, Meredith G. (May 1958). "Because It Had Not Rained". Westminster Theological Journal. 20 (2): 146–157.
- ——— (1996). "Space and Time in the Genesis Cosmogony". Perspectives on Science and Christian Faith (48): 2–15.
- Kline, Meredith G. (2016). Genesis: A New Commentary. Hendrickson. ISBN 978-1-61970-852-5.
- Knight, Douglas A. (1990). "Cosmology". In Mills, Watson E. (ed.). Mercer Dictionary of the Bible. Mercer University Press. ISBN 978-0-86554-373-7.
- Knohl, Israel (2003). The Divine Symphony: The Bible's Many Voices. Jewish Publication Society. ISBN 978-0-8276-1018-7.
- Kooij, Arie van der (2010). "The Story of Paradise in the Light of Mesopotamian Culture and Literature". In Dell, Katherine J.; Davies, Graham; Koh, Yee Von (eds.). Genesis, Isaiah, and Psalms. Brill. ISBN 978-90-04-18231-8.
- Kramer, Samuel Noah (1971) [1963]. The Sumerians: Their History, Culture, and Character. University of Chicago Press. ISBN 0-226-45238-7.
- Kutsko, John F. (2000). Between Heaven and Earth: Divine Presence and Absence in the Book of Ezekiel. Eisenbrauns. ISBN 978-1-57506-041-5.
- Kvam, Kristen E.; Schearing, Linda S.; Ziegler, Valarie H., eds. (1999). Eve and Adam: Jewish, Christian, and Muslim Readings on Genesis and Gender. Indiana University Press. p. 515. ISBN 0-253-21271-5.
- Lambert, W. G. (1965). "A New Look at the Babylonian Background of Genesis". The Journal of Theological Studies. Vol. 16, no. 2. pp. 287–300. JSTOR 23959032.
- Leeming, David A. (2004). "Biblical creation". The Oxford Companion to World Mythology. Oxford University Press. ISBN 978-0-19-515669-0.
- Leeming, David A.; Leeming, Margaret (2004). "Hebrew Creation". A Dictionary of Creation Myths. Oxford University Press. ISBN 978-0-19-510275-8.
- Levenson, Jon D. (2004). "Genesis: Introduction and Annotations". In Berlin, Adele; Brettler, Marc Zvi (eds.). The Jewish study Bible. Oxford University Press. ISBN 978-0-19-529751-5.
- Longman, Tremper (2005). How to Read Genesis. How to Read Series. InterVarsity. ISBN 978-0-8308-7560-3.
- May, Gerhard (2004). Creatio Ex Nihilo (English trans. of 1994 ed.). T&T Clarke. ISBN 978-0-567-08356-2.
- McCabe, Robert V. (2005). "A Critique of the Framework Interpretation of the Creation Account (Part 1 of 2)" (PDF). Detroit Baptist Seminary Journal. 10: 19–67. Archived from the original (PDF) on 3 March 2016.
- McClellan, Dan (2025). "Monotheism". Oxford Research Encyclopedia of Religion. Oxford University Press. doi:10.1093/acrefore/9780199340378.013.1195. ISBN 978-0-19-934037-8.
- McDermott, John J. (2002). Reading the Pentateuch: A Historical Introduction. Paulist. ISBN 978-0-8091-4082-4.
- Nebe, Gottfried (2002). "Creation in Paul's Theology". In Hoffman, Yair; Reventlow, Henning Graf (eds.). Creation in Jewish and Christian Tradition. Sheffield. ISBN 978-0-567-57393-3.
- Parrish, V. Steven (1990). "Creation". In Mills, Watson E. (ed.). Mercer Dictionary of the Bible. Mercer University Press. ISBN 978-0-86554-373-7.
- Propp, W. H. (1990). "Eden Sketches". In Propp, W. H.; Halpern, Baruch; Freedman, D. N. (eds.). The Hebrew Bible and its Interpreters. Eisenbrauns. ISBN 978-0-931464-52-2.
- The Random House Dictionary of the English Language. New York: Random House. 1979. LCCN 74-129225.
- Ridderbos, N. H. (1957). Is There a Conflict Between Genesis 1 and Natural Science?. Eerdmans.
- van Ruiten, Jacques T. A. G. M. (2000). Primaeval History Interpreted. Brill. ISBN 90-04-11658-3.
- Rogerson, John William (1991). Genesis 1–11. T&T Clark. ISBN 978-0-567-08338-8.
- Ryken, Leland; Wilhoit, Jim; Longman, Tremper; Duriez, Colin; Penney, Douglas; Reid, Daniel G., eds. (1998). "Cosmology". Dictionary of Biblical Imagery. InterVarsity. ISBN 978-0-8308-6733-2.
- Sarna, Nahum M. (1966). Understanding Genesis: Through Rabbinic Tradition and Modern Scholarship. The Heritage of Biblical Israel. Vol. 1. New York: The Jewish Theological Seminary of America. ISBN 0-87334-177-5.
- Sarna, Nahum M. (1997). "The Mists of Time: Genesis I–II". In Feyerick, Ada (ed.). Genesis: World of Myths and Patriarchs. New York: New York University Press. pp. 49–82. ISBN 0-8147-2668-2.
- Seidman, Naomi (2010). "Translation". In Ronald Hendel (ed.). Reading Genesis: Ten Methods. Cambridge University Press. ISBN 978-0-521-51861-1.
- Seeley, Paul H. (1991). "The Firmament and the Water Above: The Meaning of Raqia in Genesis 1:6–8" (PDF). Westminster Theological Journal. 53. Westminster Theological Seminary: 227–240. Archived from the original (PDF) on 5 March 2009.
- Seeley, Paul H. (1997). "The Geographical Meaning of 'Earth' and 'Seas' in Genesis 1:10" (PDF). Westminster Theological Journal. 59. Westminster Theological Seminary: 231–255. Archived from the original (PDF) on 16 October 2020.
- Ska, Jean-Louis (2006). Introduction to Reading the Pentateuch. Eisenbrauns. ISBN 978-1-57506-122-1.
- Smith, Mark S. (2001). The Origins of Biblical Monotheism: Israel's Polytheistic Background and the Ugaritic Texts (New ed.). Oxford University Press. ISBN 0-19-516768-6.
- Smith, Mark; Pitard, Wayne (2008). The Ugaritic Baal Cycle: Volume II. Introduction with Text, Translation and Commentary of KTU/CAT 1.3–1.4. Brill. ISBN 978-90-474-4232-5.
- Soskice, Janet M. (2010). "Creatio ex nihilo: its Jewish and Christian foundations". In Burrell, David B.; Cogliati, Carlo; Soskice, Janet M.; Stoeger, William R. (eds.). Creation and the God of Abraham. Cambridge University Press. ISBN 978-1-139-49078-8.
- Speiser, Ephraim Avigdor (1964). Genesis. Doubleday.
- Spencer, Alexander (2018). "Narratives and the romantic genre in IR dominant and marginalized stories of Arab Rebellion in Libya". International Politics. 56 (1). Springer: 123–140. doi:10.1057/s41311-018-0171-z. ISSN 1384-5748. S2CID 149826920. "Narratives here are considered to be part of human mental activity and give meaning to experiences."
- Stordalen, Terje (2000). Echoes of Eden. Peeters. ISBN 978-90-429-0854-3.
- Thomas, Matthew A. (2011). These Are the Generations: Identity, Covenant and the Toledot Formula. T&T Clark. ISBN 978-0-567-48764-3.
- Thompson, J. A. (1980). Jeremiah. New International Commentary on the Old Testament (2nd ed.). William B. Eerdmans. p. 831. ISBN 0-8028-2530-3.
- Tsumura, David Toshio (2022). "Creation Out of Conflict? The Chaoskampf Motif in the Old Testament: Cosmic Dualism or creatio ex nihilo". In Macaskill, Grant; M. Maier, Christl; Schaper, Joachim (eds.). Congress Volume Aberdeen 2019. Brill. ISBN 978-90-04-51510-9.
- Turner, Laurence A. (2009). Genesis. Sheffield Phoenix Press. ISBN 978-1-906055-65-3.
- Van Seters, John (1998). "The Pentateuch". In McKenzie, Steven L.; Graham, M. Patrick (eds.). The Hebrew Bible Today: An Introduction to Critical Issues. Westminster John Knox Press. ISBN 978-0-664-25652-4.
- Van Seters, John (1992). Prologue to History: The Yahwist As Historian in Genesis. New International Commentary on the Old Testament. Westminster John Knox Press. ISBN 0-664-22179-3.
- Walsh, Jerome T. (2001). Style and Structure in Biblical Hebrew Narrative. Liturgical. ISBN 978-0-8146-5897-0.
- Waltke, Bruce (1991). "The Literary Genre of Genesis, Chapter One" (PDF). Crux. 27 (4). Westminster Theological Seminary. Archived from the original (PDF) on 29 April 2014.
- Waltke, Bruce K; Fredricks, Cathi J (2001). Genesis. Zondervan. ISBN 978-0-310-22458-7.
- Walton, John H. (2001). The NIV Application Commentary: Genesis. Zondervan. ISBN 978-0-310-86620-6.
- Walton, John H. (2003). "Creation". In Alexander, T. Desdmond; Baker, David W. (eds.). Dictionary of the Old Testament: Pentateuch. IVP Bible Dictionary Series. InterVarsity. pp. 155–168. ISBN 978-0-8308-1781-8.
- Walton, John H. (2006). Ancient Near Eastern Thought and the Old Testament: Introducing the Conceptual World of the Hebrew Bible. Baker. ISBN 0-8010-2750-0.
- Webster (1984). Webster's Seventh New Collegiate Dictionary. Springfield: G&C Merriam.
- Wenham, Gordon (2003a). Exploring the Old Testament: A Guide to the Pentateuch. Exploring the Bible. Vol. 1. IVP Academic. p. 223.
- Wenham, Gordon (2003b). "Genesis". In Dunn, James Douglas Grant; Rogerson, J. John William (eds.). Eerdmans Commentary on the Bible. Eerdmans. ISBN 978-0-8028-3711-0.
- Wenham, Gordon J. (1987). Genesis 1–15. Vol. 1 and 2. Waco, Texas: Word Books. ISBN 0-8499-0200-2.
- Whybray, R. N. (2001). "Genesis". In Barton, John; Muddiman, John (eds.). The Oxford Bible Commentary. Oxford University Press. pp. 38–66. doi:10.1093/acref/9780198755005.001.0001. ISBN 978-0-19-875500-5.
- Wilkinson, David (2009). "Reading Genesis 1–3 in the Light of Modern Science". In Barton, Stephen C.; Wilkinson, David (eds.). Reading Genesis after Darwin. Oxford University Press. ISBN 978-0-19-538336-2.
- Wood, Ralpth C. (1990). "Genre, Concept of". In Mills, Watson E. (ed.). Mercer Dictionary of the Bible. Mercer University Press. ISBN 978-0-86554-373-7.
- Wright, J. Edward (2002). The Early History of Heaven. Oxford University Press. ISBN 978-0-19-534849-1.
- Young, Davis A. (1988). "The Contemporary Relevance of Augustine's View of Creation". Perspectives on Science and Christian Faith. 40 (1): 42–45.
