= Bruce Waltke =

American biblical scholar, theologian, and academic (born 1930)

Bruce K. Waltke
- Born: August 30, 1930 (age 96); New Jersey, United States
- Title: Professor of Old Testament and Hebrew
- Board member of: Translation committee of the New American Standard Bible

Academic background
- Education: Houghton College (BA); Dallas Theological Seminary (ThM, DTh); Harvard University (PhD)
- Thesis: Prolegomena to the Samaritan Pentateuch (1965)

Academic work
- Discipline: Biblical studies
- Institutions: Dallas Theological Seminary; Regent College; Westminster Theological Seminary; Reformed Theological Seminary in Orlando, Florida; Knox Theological Seminary
- Notable works: Proverbs (NICOT)

Bruce K. Waltke (born August 30, 1930) is an American Reformed evangelical professor of Old Testament and Hebrew. He has held professorships in the Old Testament at Dallas Theological Seminary, Regent College in Vancouver, British Columbia, Westminster Theological Seminary in Philadelphia, Pennsylvania, Reformed Theological Seminary in Orlando, Florida, and Knox Theological Seminary in Ft. Lauderdale, Florida.

== Early life and education ==
Waltke was born in New Jersey to parents in the Mennonite Brethren tradition. He received an A.B. from Houghton College, a Th.M. in 1956 and Th.D. in 1958 (Greek and New Testament) from Dallas Theological Seminary, and a Ph.D. (Ancient Near Eastern Languages and Literature) from Harvard University in 1965. His first dissertation was titled "The Theological Significations of ʼanti and ʻuper in the New Testament". and his second, "Prolegomena to the Samaritan Pentateuch". Additionally, Waltke has been awarded an honorary D.Litt. from Houghton College.

== Career ==
His teaching career as a professor of Old Testament spanned Dallas Theological Seminary (1958–1976), (Note: During this span, he spent two years away at Harvard obtaining his second doctorate and one year as a post-doctoral fellow in Jerusalem at Hebrew Union College) Regent College (1976–1985; 1991–1995), Westminster Theological Seminary (1985–1990), Reformed Theological Seminary (1990–2010), and Knox Theological Seminary (2011–).

Waltke served as president of the Evangelical Theological Society in 1975. He was on the translation committee for the New American Standard Bible (NASB), and was on the Committee for Bible Translation (CBT) for many years, responsible for the New International Version (NIV), since its inception in 1974. In 2002, Waltke spoke out in defense of Today's New International Version (TNIV) in response to criticism by James Dobson and Richard Land over perceived gender inclusive language in early drafts of the translation.

Waltke's books include Intermediate Hebrew Grammar, Introduction to Biblical Hebrew Syntax, Finding the Will of God: A Pagan Notion? (Eerdmans, 2016; ISBN 978-0802872678), Creation and Chaos, and commentaries on Proverbs (New International Commentary on the Old Testament, 2 vols.), Micah (Tyndale Commentary Series), and with C. J. Fredricks Genesis (Zondervan 2001, ISBN 978-0-310-22458-7), which was a winner of the 2002 Gold Medallion Book Award. He was co-editor for the Theological Wordbook of the Old Testament, and he was the Old Testament editor for the Expositor's Bible Commentary series, the New Geneva Study Bible, and the Spirit of the Reformation Study Bible. He wrote An Old Testament Theology: An Exegetical, Canonical, and Thematic Approach, which received an ECPA Christian Book Award in 2008.

Waltke has travelled widely as a Bible expositor, as an area supervisor for excavations at Gezer, Israel, and as the director of field study trips to the Middle East and the Classical world.

A Festschrift, The Way of Wisdom: Essays in Honor of Bruce K. Waltke, (Grand Rapids: Zondervan, 2000; ISBN 0-310-22728-3) was edited by J. I. Packer and Sven K. Soderlund.

In April 2010, news reports emerged alleging that Waltke was asked to resign his professorship at the Reformed Theological Seminary because he advocated that evolution and Christianity were compatible in a video on the Biologos Foundation's website. However, the RTS chancellor, Ric Cannada, later stated that this was not the case and that Waltke had submitted his resignation without solicitation. Waltke himself clarified things: "Ric's acceptance of my resignation has only added to the emotional turmoil; I have received letters from many quarters condemning RTS for his action. In fact, I was asked to be interviewed about my resignation on ABC News with Diane Sawyer! Of course, I refused because I am certain it would have been spun to reflect negatively on RTS and the church. I find no fault with the RTS administration; in fact, I think they did the right thing."

Waltke now serves with the clergy at an ACNA Anglican parish in Washington state. He is also professor emeritus of biblical studies at Regent College and distinguished professor emeritus of Old Testament at Knox Theological Seminary.

== Personal life ==
Waltke is married and has three grown children.

== Works ==
=== Thesis ===
- Waltke, Bruce K. (1965). Prolegomena to the Samaritan Pentateuch (Ph.D.). Harvard University.

=== Books ===
- ———; Barker, Kenneth L. (1975). Bibliography for Old Testament exegesis and exposition. Dallas, TX: Dallas Theological Seminary. OCLC 8370624.
- ——— (1974). Creation and Chaos: an exegetical and theological study of biblical cosmogony. Portland, OR: Western Conservative Baptist Seminary. OCLC 2218525.
- ———; Harris, R. Laird; Archer, Gleason L., eds. (1980). Theological Wordbook of the Old Testament. Chicago, IL: Moody Press. ISBN 978-0-802-48631-8. OCLC 7172186. - in 2 volumes
- ——— (1988). Evangelical Spirituality : a biblical scholar's perspective. Evangelical Theological Society papers. Vol. 3920. Evangelical Theological Society papers. OCLC 18613301.
- ———; O'Connor, Michael Patrick (1990). An Introduction to Biblical Hebrew Syntax. Winona Lake, IN: Eisenbrauns, 1990. ISBN 978-0-931-46431-7. OCLC 20088442.
- ——— (2002). Finding the Will of God: a pagan notion?. Grand Rapids, MI: Eerdmans. ISBN 978-0-802-83974-9. OCLC 48649263.
- ———; Sproul, R. C.; Silva, Moisés, eds. (1995). New Geneva Study Bible: bringing the light of the Reformation to Scripture : New King James Version. Nashville, TN: Thomas Nelson. ISBN 9780840710918. OCLC 40444748. - Waltke served as OT editor.
- ———; MacGregor, Jerry (1998). Knowing the Will of God. Eugene, OR: Harvest House. ISBN 978-1-565-07933-5. OCLC 38566285.
- ———; Sproul, R. C.; Silva, Moisés, eds. (2001). The Reformation Study Bible : New King James Version. Nashville, TN: Thomas Nelson. ISBN 978-0-785-25852-0. OCLC 47917918. - retitling of the New Geneva Study Bible.
- ———; Fredricks, Cathi J. (2001). Genesis: a commentary. Grand Rapids, MI: Zondervan. ISBN 978-0-310-22458-7. OCLC 45888776.
- ——— (2004). The Book of Proverbs: chapters 1-15. New International Commentary on the Old Testament. Grand Rapids, MI: Eerdmans. ISBN 978-0-802-82545-2. OCLC 59194216.
- ——— (2005). The Book of Proverbs: chapters 15-31. New International Commentary on the Old Testament. Grand Rapids, MI: Eerdmans. ISBN 978-0-802-82776-0. OCLC 58801660.
- ———; Yu, Charles (2007). An Old Testament Theology: an exegetical, canonical, and thematic approach. Grand Rapids, MI: Zondervan. ISBN 978-0-310-21897-5. OCLC 62895805.
- ——— (2007). A Commentary on Micah. Grand Rapids, MI: Eerdmans. ISBN 978-0-802-84933-5. OCLC 68623991.
- ———; Houston, James M. (2010). The Psalms as Christian worship : a historical commentary. Grand Rapids, MI: Eerdmans. ISBN 978-0-802-86374-4. OCLC 368051319.
- ——— (2013). The Dance Between God and Humanity: reading the Bible today as the people of God. Grand Rapids, MI: Eerdmans. ISBN 978-0-802-86736-0. OCLC 813541335.
- ——— (2014). The Psalms as Christian Lament: a historical commentary. Grand Rapids, MI: Eerdmans. ISBN 978-0-802-86809-1. OCLC 866857469.
- ———; Houston, James M. (2019). The Psalms as Christian Praise : A Historical Commentary. Grand Rapids, MI: Eerdmans. ISBN 978-0-8028-7702-4.
- ———; De Silva, Ivan D. V. (2021). Proverbs: A Shorter Commentary. Grand Rapids, MI: Eerdmans. ISBN 978-0-8028-7503-7.
- ———; Zaspel, Fred G. (2023). How to Read and Understand the Psalms. Wheaton, IL: Crossway. ISBN 978-1433584336.

=== Articles and chapters ===
- ——— (1979). "The Book of Proverbs and Ancient Wisdom Literature". Bibliotheca Sacra. 136 (543): 222–238.
- ——— (1988). "Micah". In Wiseman, Donald J. (ed.). Obadiah, Jonah and Micah. Tyndale Old Testament Commentaries. Vol. 26. Nottingham, England: Inter-Varsity Press. ISBN 978-1-783-59263-0.
- ——— (Spring 1989). "Aims of OT Textual Criticism". Westminster Theological Journal. 51 (1): 93–108.
- ——— (1988). "Oral Tradition". In Conn, Harvie M. (ed.). Inerrancy and Hermeneutic. Grand Rapids, MI: Baker. pp. 117–36.
- ——— (Fall 1990). "The Date of the Conquest". Westminster Theological Journal. 52 (2): 181–200.
- ——— (1979). "The Book of Proverbs and Old Testament Theology". Bibliotheca Sacra. 136 (544): 302–317.
- ——— (Autumn 1996). "Does Proverbs Promise Too Much". Andrews University Seminary Studies. 34 (2): 319–336.
- ——— (Fall 2008). "Righteousness in Proverbs". Westminster Theological Journal. 70 (2): 225–237.

=== Training course ===
- ——— (2018). OT300 Old Testament Theology (16 hour course) (Video, Audio & Text). Logos Mobile Education. Bellingham, WA: Lexham Press.

== Festschrift ==
- Packer, James I.; Soderlund, Sven K. (2000). The Way of Wisdom: Essays in Honor of Bruce K. Waltke. Grand Rapids, MI: Zondervan. ISBN 978-0-310-22728-1. OCLC 43913272.
