= Walter C. Wright =

Walter C. Wright Jr. is former executive director of the Max De Pree Center for Leadership at Fuller Theological Seminary in Pasadena, California. He was previously President of Regent College in Vancouver from 1988 to 2000.

Wright obtained a PhD from Fuller and is the author of Relational Leadership: A Biblical Model for Leadership Service. He emphasizes the importance of mentoring.
