= John H. Walton =

American biblical scholar and professor

- Born: 1952 (age 73–74)
- Known for: Lost World of… books
- Title: Emeritus Professor of Old Testament

Academic background
- Education: M.A. Biblical Studies: Old Testament, Wheaton Graduate School
- Alma mater: Ph.D., Hebrew Union College-Jewish Institute of Religion

Academic work
- Discipline: Biblical studies
- Sub-discipline: Old Testament studies
- Institutions: Moody Bible Institute; Wheaton College

John H. Walton (born 1952) is an Old Testament scholar. He is Professor Emeritus at Wheaton College and was a Moody Bible Institute professor previously. He specializes in the relationship between religion and science, and the Ancient Near Eastern backgrounds of the Old Testament, especially Genesis and its creation account, as well as interpretation of Job and Daniel.

== Views on Genesis ==
Walton espouses a view of Genesis creation narrative that resonates with ancient Near Eastern mindsets, much like a temple dedication ceremony, and not a strictly material account of cosmological origins. He uses a restaurant as an analogy, arguing that a restaurant does not begin to exist when the material building is completed, but when the owner declares the restaurant open for business. Through his book The Lost World of Genesis One he presents the Genesis creation as being functional; according to Walton, the creation narrative is not intended to answer questions about the material origin of the universe, and therefore does not contradict scientific views on it. This view is opposed by some theologians such as Vern Poythress and young earth creationist Ken Ham.

== Publications ==
=== Books ===
- Walton, John H. (1989). Ancient Israelite Literature in its Cultural Context, A Survey of Parallels Between Biblical and Ancient Near Eastern Texts. Grand Rapids, MI: Zondervan.
- ———; Hill, Andrew H. (1991). A Survey of the Old Testament. Grand Rapids, MI: Zondervan. ISBN 9780310516002.
- ——— (1994). Covenant: God's Purpose, God's Plan. Harper Collins. ISBN 978-0-3105-7751-5.
- ——— (2001). Genesis. NIV Application Commentary. Grand Rapids, MI: Zondervan.
- ——— (2004). Old Testament Today. Grand Rapids, MI: Zondervan.
- ——— (2006). Essential Bible Companion. Grand Rapids, MI: Zondervan.
- ——— (2006). Ancient Near Eastern Thought and the Old Testament. Grand Rapids, MI: Baker Academic.
- ——— (2008). Jonah. Expositor's Bible Commentary. Grand Rapids, MI: Zondervan.
- ——— (2009). The Lost World of Genesis One: Ancient Cosmology and the Origins Debate. Downers Grove, IL: IVP.
- ——— (2011). Genesis 1 as Ancient Cosmology. Warsaw, IA: Eisenbrauns.
- ——— (2012). Job. NIV Application Commentary. Grand Rapids, MI: Zondervan.
- ———; Sandy, D. Brent (2013). The Lost World of Scripture: Ancient Literary Culture and Biblical Authority. Downers Grove, IL: IVP.
- ——— (2015). The Lost World of Adam and Eve: Genesis 2–3 and the Human Origins Debate. Downers Grove, IL: IVP Academic.
- ——— (2017). The Lost World of the Israelite Conquest: Covenant, Retribution, and the Fate of the Canaanites. Downers Grove, IL: IVP Academic. ISBN 978-0-83085184-3.
- ———; Longman, Tremper III (2018). The Lost World of the Flood: Mythology, Theology, and the Deluge Debate. Downers Grove, IL: IVP Academic. ISBN 978-0-83085200-0. OCLC 1011175969.
- ——— (2019). The Lost World of the Torah: Law as Covenant and Wisdom in Ancient Context. Downers Grove, IL: IVP Academic. ISBN 978-0-83085241-3.
- ———; Walton, J Harvey (2019). Demons and Spirits in Biblical Theology: Reading the Biblical Text in Its Cultural and Literary Context. Eugene, OR: Cascade Books. ISBN 978-1-62564-825-9.
- Walton, John; Buster, Aubrey (November 2025). The Book of Daniel, Chapters 1–6. Vol. 1. Eerdmans.

=== Chapters ===
- ——— (2000). "The Anzu Myth as relevant Background for Daniel 7?". In Collins, John J.; Flint, Peter W. (eds.). The Book of Daniel: Composition and Reception. Vetus Testament Supplement, FIOTL. Leiden: Brill. ISBN 978-900411675-7. OCLC 461457097.

=== Journal articles ===
- ——— (1995). "The Mesopotamian Background of the Tower of Babel Account and Its Implications". Bulletin for Biblical Research. 5: 155–75. doi:10.2307/26422132. JSTOR 26422132.
- ——— (2001). "Recovering the Vitality of the Old Testament in Preaching". Preaching Today. 17.
- ——— (2001). "Equilibrium and the Sacred Compass: The Structure of Leviticus". Bulletin for Biblical Research. 11 (2): 1–12.
- ——— (2002). "Inspired Subjectivity and Hermeneutical Objectivity". The Master's Seminary Journal. 13 (1): 65–77.
- ——— (2003). "The Imagery of the Substitute King Ritual in Isaiah's Fourth Servant Song". Journal of Biblical Literature. 122 (4): 734–43. doi:10.2307/3268075. JSTOR 3268075.
- ——— (2008). "Creation in Genesis 1:1–2:3 and the Ancient Near East: Order out of Disorder after Chaoskampf". Calvin Theological Journal. 43: 48–63.
