= James M. Houston =

Canadian Protestant theologian (1922–2026)

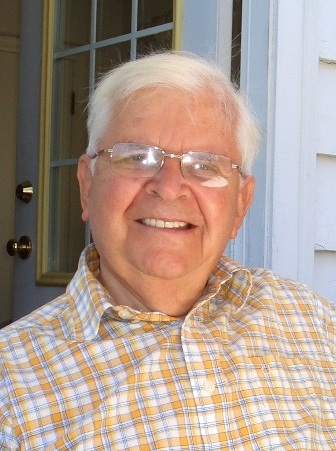
- Houston in 2005
- Born: James Macintosh Houston; 21 November 1922; Edinburgh, Scotland
- Died: 15 March 2026 (aged 103); Vancouver, British Columbia, Canada
- Title: Principal of Regent College (1970–1978)
- Spouse: Rita Houston (m. 1953; died 2014)
- Children: 4

Academic background
- Education: University of Oxford
- Thesis: The Social Geography of the Huerta of Valencia (1950)
- Influences: Jacques Ellul; C. S. Lewis; Michael Polanyi

Academic work
- Discipline: Geography; theology
- School or tradition: Plymouth Brethren Christianity
- Institutions: Hertford College, Oxford; Regent College
- Main interests: Christian mind; prayer; Trinity; spiritual formation

James Macintosh Houston (21 November 1922 – 15 March 2026) was a British-born Canadian Protestant theologian and academic who was Professor of Spiritual Theology and the first Principal of Regent College in Vancouver.

== Life and career ==
Born on 21 November 1922, in Edinburgh, Scotland, Houston moved to Oxford in 1945 for doctoral studies in geography at the University of Oxford. He received his doctorate in c. 1950. His thesis was titled The Social Geography of the Huerta of Valencia. Houston was a fellow of Hertford College, Oxford, where he served as a geography lecturer.

Houston emigrated with his wife and four children to North America in 1970, and became one of the founders of Regent College, a graduate school of Christian studies. From 1970 to 1978, he was Principal of the college, (Note: However, Houston did not formally resign from the University of Oxford until 1971.) and in 1991, he was appointed to the chair. His major areas of interest include the Christian mind, the Trinity, prayer, and spiritual formation. He has published numerous articles in books and scholarly journals. His autobiography, Memoirs of a Joyous Exile and a Worldly Christian, was published in 2020.

He later resided in Vancouver. In addition to his continuation of writing, Houston spent a great deal of time mentoring students. Houston had four children, nine grandchildren, and fifteen great-grandchildren. He was the primary caregiver for his wife, Rita, who had dementia in her latter years and died on 8 October 2014, at the age of 90.

Houston turned 100 in November 2022, and died in Vancouver on 15 March 2026, at the age of 103.

== Works ==
=== Books ===
- Houston, James M (2022). An Introduction to Child Theology. Cascade Books. ISBN 978-1-7252-8562-0.
- Houston, James M (5 April 2020). Memoirs of a Joyous Exile and a Worldly Christian. Cascade Books. ISBN 978-1-5326-8007-6..
- Houston, James M; Parker, Michael (2012). A Vision for the Aging Church; Renewing Ministry for and by Seniors..
- ———; Reese, Randy D; Loane, Robert (25 September 2012). "Foreword". Deep Mentoring: Guiding Others on Their Leadership Journey. IVP. ISBN 978-0-8308-3789-2..
- ———; Myers, Glenn E (2011). Seeking Spiritual Intimacy: Journeying Deeper with Medieval Women of Faith..
- ———; Willard, Dallas (2011). The Mentored Life: From Individualism to Personhood. NavPress. ISBN 978-1-57683-318-6.
- ———; Willard, Dallas (2010). The Transforming Friendship: A Guide to Prayer..
- ———; Waltke, Bruce K (2010). The Psalms as Christian Worship: An Historical Commentary..
- ——— (November 2007). The Disciple: Following the True Mentor. Soul's Longing. David C Cook. ISBN 978-0-7814-4428-6..
- ——— (November 2007). The Creator: Living Well in God's World. Soul's Longing. David C Cook. ISBN 978-0-7814-4427-9..
- ——— (July 2007). The Prayer. Soul's Longing. David C Cook. ISBN 978-0-7814-4426-2.
- ——— (April 2007). The Fulfillment. Soul's Longing. Vol. 2: Pursuing True Happiness. David C Cook. ISBN 978-0-7814-4425-5.
- ——— (April 2007) [2005]. The Desire. Soul's Longing. Vol. 1: Satisfying The Heart. David C Cook. ISBN 978-0-7814-4424-8..
- ——— (October 2006). Letters of Faith Through the Seasons: A Treasury of Great Christians' Correspondence. Vol. 1. Dec–May. David C Cook. ISBN 978-1-56292-749-3..
- ——— (October 2006). Joyful Exiles: Life in Christ on the Dangerous Edge of Things. Intervarsity Press. ISBN 978-0-8308-3324-5..
- ———; of Avila, Teresa (2005). Life of Prayer. Victor Classics..
- ———; Pascal, Blaise; Guinness, Os (2003) [1997]. The Mind on Fire: A Faith for the Skeptical and Indifferent..
- ——— (15 June 2002). The Mentored Life. NavPress. ISBN 978-1-57683-318-6..
- ———; Anderson, Keith R; Reese, Randy D (1999). "Foreword". Spiritual Mentoring: A Guide for Seeking and Giving Direction. IVP. ISBN 978-0-8308-2210-2..
- ——— (1998). The Transforming Power of Prayer: Deepening Your Friendship with God. NavPress Publishing. ISBN 1-57683-118-3..
- ———; Green, Michael (1995). I Believe in the Creator. Regent College Publishing. ISBN 1-57383-046-1..
- ———; Bockmuehl, Klaus; Yanni, Kathryn (1991). Listening to the God Who Speaks: Reflections on God's Guidance from Scripture and the Lives of God's People..
- ——— (April 2001). The Heart's Desire: Satisfying the Hunger of the Soul. Regent College Publishing. ISBN 1-57383-209-X..
- ——— (January 2001) [1996]. In Pursuit of Happiness: Finding Genuine Fulfillment in Life. Regent College Publishing. ISBN 1-57383-210-3.. 1st ed. by Navpress, ISBN 978-0-89109-936-9.

=== Edited work ===
- de Valdés, Juan; Benedetto, Don (1 April 2003). ——— (ed.). The Benefit of Christ: Living Justified Because of Christ's Death. Regent College. ISBN 978-1-57383-251-9..
- de Sales, Francis; John of the Cross; Lewis, Clive Staples; O'Connor, Flannery; Luther, Martin; Kierkgård, Søren (February 2007). ——— (ed.). Letters of Faith Through the Seasons: A Treasury of Great Christians' Correspondence. Vol. 2. David C. Cook Publishing. ISBN 978-1-56292-834-6..
- Baxter, Richard (January 2005). ——— (ed.). Watch Your Walk: A Pattern For Personal Growth and Ministry. Victor Classics. Victor Books. ISBN 978-0-7814-4179-7..
- Edwards, Jonathan (8 December 2004). ——— (ed.). Faith Beyond Feelings: discerning the heart of true spirituality. Victor Classics. David C Cook. ISBN 978-0-7814-4171-1..
- Edwards, Jonathan (2003). ———; Colson, Charles (eds.). Religious Affections: A Christian's Character Before God..
- Owen, John (December 2004). ——— (ed.). Triumph Over Temptation: The Challenge To Personal Godliness: Pursuing A Life of Purity. Victor Classics. David C Cook. ISBN 978-0-7814-4172-8..
- Simeon, Charles; Stott, John RW (2003). ——— (ed.). Evangelical Preaching: An Anthology of Sermons..
- Wilberforce, William (28 March 2003). ——— (ed.). Real Christianity: Discerning True and False Faith. Hatfield, Mark O, intr. Regent College. ISBN 978-1-57383-246-5..
- Pascal, Blaise (1997). ———; Guinness, Os (eds.). Mind on Fire: A Christian's Character Before God. Classics of Faith and Devotion..
- Edwards, Jonathan (2003) [1996]. ——— (ed.). Religious Affections: A Christian's Character Before God. ISBN 978-1-57383-240-3..
- Owen, John; Packer, JI (1983). ——— (ed.). Sin & Temptation: The Challenge to Personal Godliness..
