= Let there be light =

Biblical phrase

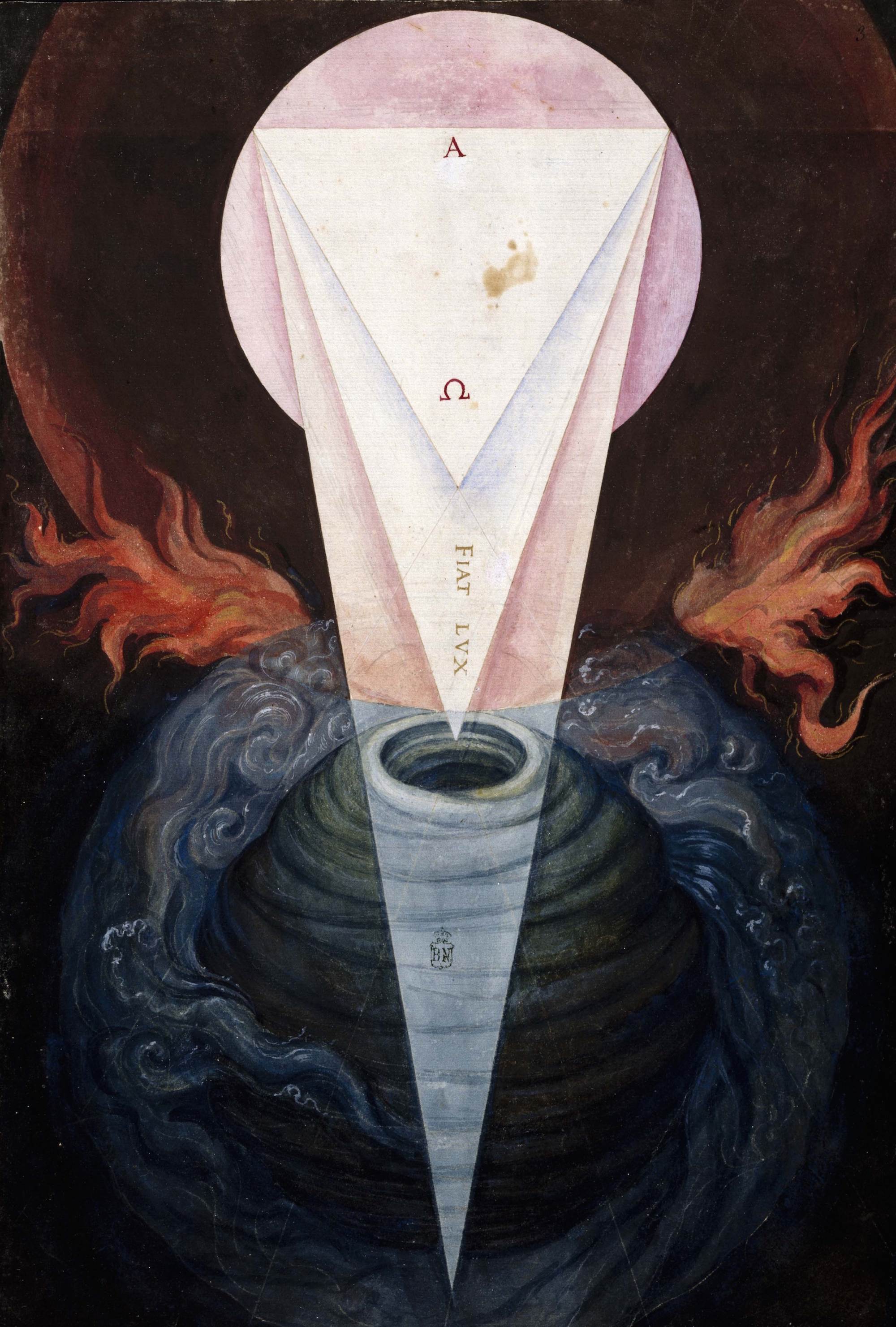
Francisco de Holanda (1545), "The First Day of Creation", De Aetatibus Mundi Imagines.

"Let there be light" is an English translation of the Hebrew phrase יְהִי אוֹר (yehi 'or) found in Genesis 1:3 of the Torah, the first part of the Hebrew Bible. In Old Testament translations of the phrase, translations include the Greek phrase γενηθήτω φῶς (genēthḗtō phôs) and the Latin phrases fiat lux and lux sit. It is part of the Genesis creation narrative.

== Genesis 1:3 ==
The phrase comes from the third verse of the Book of Genesis. In the King James Bible, it reads, in context:

^{1}In the beginning God created the heaven and the earth.
^{2}And the earth was without form, and void; and darkness was upon the face of the deep. And the Spirit of God moved upon the face of the waters.
^{3}And God said, Let there be light: and there was light.
^{4}And God saw the light, and it was good; and God divided the light from the darkness.

== Origin and etymology ==
In biblical Hebrew, the phrase יְהִי אוֹר (yəhî ’ôr) is made of two words. יְהִי (yəhî) is the third-person masculine singular jussive form of "to exist" and אוֹר (’ôr) means "light."

In the Koine Greek Septuagint the phrase is translated "καὶ εἶπεν ὁ Θεός γενηθήτω φῶς καὶ ἐγένετο φῶς" — kaì eîpen ho Theós genēthḗtō phôs kaì egéneto phôs. Γενηθήτω is the imperative form of γίγνομαι, "to come into being."

The original Latinization of the Greek translation used in the Vetus Latina was lux sit ("light – let it exist" or "let light exist"), which has been used occasionally, although there is debate as to its accuracy.

In the Latin Vulgate Bible, the Hebrew phrase יְהִי אוֹר is translated in Latin as fiat lux. In context, the translation is "dixitque Deus fiat lux et facta est lux" ("And said God let there be light, and there was light"). Literally, fiat lux would be translated as "let light be made" (fiat is the third person singular present passive subjunctive form of the verb facio, meaning "to do" or "to make"). The Douay–Rheims Bible translates the phrase, from the Vulgate, as "Be light made. And light was made." The phrase "Let there be light" first appeared in the Tyndale Bible.

== Usage ==
"Let there be light", sometimes in its Latin form, fiat lux, is used as a motto by many educational institutions (using light as a metaphor for knowledge). The University of California is one example. The phrase also forms the chorus of John Marriott's hymn about creation, "Thou, Whose Almighty Word".
