= Textual variants in the Book of Genesis =

Differences in Book of Genesis manuscripts

Textual variants in the Book of Genesis concerns textual variants in the Hebrew Bible found in the Book of Genesis.

== Legend ==
Purported inter-relationship between significant ancient Old Testament manuscripts (some identified by their siglum).

Sigla (symbols and abbreviations) of Hebrew Bible manuscripts, versions, and editions are listed below, following the system outlined in BHQ.

G: the reconstructed Old Greek translation of the Hebrew Bible

G^{L}: the recension of the Old Greek by Lucian of Antioch
G^{O}: the recension of the Old Greek by Origen

Ḥev: the Greek Minor Prophets Scroll from Nahal Hever
Hex: a Hexaplaric reading

α': Aquila
θ': Theodotion
σ': Symmachus
γ': the "Three", that is, Aquila, Theodotion, and Symmachus

Hie: writings of Jerome (Lt. Hieronymus)
La: the Old Latin translation
M: the Masoretic Text

M^{A}: the Aleppo Codex
M^{B}: Codex Orientales 4445
M^{C}: the Codex Cairensis
M^{L}: the Leningrad Codex
M^{(ket)}: the ketiv
M^{(qere)}: the qere

Mur: the Minor Prophets scroll discovered at Wadi Murabba'at
Nash: the Nash Papyrus
xQx: a scroll from the Dead Sea Scrolls
S: the Syriac Peshitta translation
Smr: the Samaritan Pentateuch
Syh: the Syro-Hexaplar version
T: Targum

T^{O}: Targum Onkelos
T^{J}: Targum Pseudo-Jonathan
T^{N}: Targum Neofiti
T^{Gnz}: Targumim from the Cairo Geniza

V: the Vulgate

Dead Sea Scrolls are identified first by the number of the cave they were found in, followed by Q for Qumran, followed by an abbreviation of the text they contain, followed by a superscript letter that denotes the nth copy of that text, e.g., 4QSam^{a} was the first scroll of the book of Samuel discovered in Cave 4 at Qumran. Any of G La M S or V can have superscript numerals or letters that denote the specific manuscript that the reading is found in, e.g., G^{905} refers to Rahlfs number 905, which is Papyrus Oxyrhynchus 656.

== List ==
This list provides examples of known textual variants, and contains the following parameters: Hebrew texts written right to left, the Hebrew text romanised left to right, an approximate English translation, and which Hebrew manuscripts or critical editions of the Hebrew Bible this textual variant can be found in. Greek (Septuagint) and Latin (Vulgate) texts are written left to right, and not romanised. Sometimes additional translation or interpretation notes are added, with references to similar verses elsewhere, or in-depth articles on the topic in question.

=== Genesis 1 ===
Genesis 1:2, see also Tohu wa-bohu

וְהָאָ֗רֶץ הָיְתָ֥ה תֹ֙הוּ֙ וָבֹ֔הוּ, wəhāʔā́reṣ hāyəṯāh ṯṓhû wāḇṓhû, 'and the earth was formless and void,' – MT (4QGen^{b}) SP
ἡ δὲ γῆ ἦν ἀόρατος καὶ ἀκατασκεύαστος, 'but the earth was unseeable and unfashioned' – LXX ABP
Terra autem erat inanis et vacua, 'But the earth was lifeless and empty' – Vg^{Colunga&Turrado}

Genesis 1:7

וַֽיְהִי־כֵֽן, wayəhî-ḵên, 'and it was so.' – MT 4QGen^{b} 4QGen^{g} SP Damascus Pent. Codex
Et factum est ita., 'And so it was done.' – Vg^{Colunga&Turrado}
omitted – LXX ABP

Genesis 1:9

מָקֹ֣ום, māqôm, 'place' – MT 4QGen^{b} Damascus Pent. Codex SP..
מקוה, mqwh, 'collection' – 4QGen.^{h}
συναγωγή, 'gathering' – LXX ABP.

Genesis 1:9

και συνηχθη το νδωρ το υποκατω του ουρανου εις τας συναγωγας αυτών και ωφθη η ζηρα, 'And the water underneath the heaven gathered together into their gatherings, and the dry [land] appeared.' – LXX ABP. Compare Book of Jubilees 2:6.
omitted – 4QGen^{bg} MT SP Damascus Pent. Codex Vg^{Colunga&Turrado}

Genesis 1:14

וַיֹּ֣אמֶר אֱלֹהִ֗ים יְהִ֤י מְאֹרֹת֙ בִּרְקִ֣יעַ הַשָּׁמַ֔יִם לְהַבְדִּ֕יל בֵּ֥ין הַיּ֖וֹם וּבֵ֣ין הַלָּ֑יְלָה, wayyṓʔmer ʔĕlōhîm yəhî məʔōrōṯ birəqî(a)ʕ haššāmáyim ləhaḇəddîl bên hayyôm ûḇên hallā́yəlāh, 'And God said, “Let there be lights in the dome of the sky to separate the day from the night' — MT
ויאמר אלהים יהי מאורות ברקיע השמים להאיר על הארץ ולהבדיל בין היום ובין הלילה, wyʔmr ʔlhym yhy mʔwrwt brqyʕ hšmym lhʔyr ʕl hʔrṣ wlhbdyl byn hywm wbyn hlylh, 'And God said: “Let there be lights in the firmament of the heavens to give light upon the earth and to separate the day from the night' — SP

=== Genesis 2 ===
Genesis 2:2

וַיְכַ֤ל אֱלֹהִים֙ בַּיּ֣וֹם הַשְּׁבִיעִ֔י מְלַאכְתּ֖וֹ אֲשֶׁ֣ר עָשָׂ֑ה, wayəḵal ʔĕlōhîm bayyôm haššəḇîʕî məlaʔḵəttô ʔăšer ʕāśāh, 'And on the seventh day God finished his work which he had made' — MT
ויכל אלהים ביום הששי מלאכתו אשר עשה, wykl ʔlhym bywm hššy mlʔktw ʔšr ʕšh, 'And God finished on the sixth day his work that he had done' — SP
καὶ συνετέλεσεν ὁ θεὸς ἐν τῇ ἡμέρᾳ τῇ ἕκτῃ τὰ ἔργα αὐτοῦ ἃ ἐποίησεν, 'And on the sixth day God finished his works that he had made' — LXX

Genesis 2:4

אֵ֣לֶּה תֹולְדֹ֧ות, ʔḗlleh ṯôləḏôṯ, 'These [are] the generations' – MT
Αὕτη ἡ βίβλος γενέσεως, 'This is the book of the origin' – LXX^{Swete} ABP
Istae sunt generationes, 'Those are (the) generations' – Vg^{Colunga&Turrado}

Genesis 2:4

אֶ֥רֶץ וְשָׁמָֽיִם, ʔéreṣ wəšāmā́yim., '[the] earth and [the] heavens' – MT
שמימ וארץ, '[the] heavens and [the] earth' – SP
τὸν οὐρανὸν καὶ τὴν γῆν, 'the heaven and the earth' – LXX LXX^{Swete} ABP
caelum et terram, '(the) heaven and (the) earth' – Vg^{Colunga&Turrado}

Genesis 2:7, see also Soul in the Bible § Genesis 2:7

וַיִּיצֶר֩ יְהוָ֨ה אֱלֹהִ֜ים אֶת־ הָֽאָדָ֗ם עָפָר֙ מִן־ הָ֣אֲדָמָ֔ה, wayyîṣer YHWH ʔĕlōhîm ʔeṯ-hā́ʔāḏām ʕāp̄ār min-hā́ʔăḏāmāh, 'Then the Lord God formed man from the dust of the ground' – MT SP.

There is a word play between אָדָם, ʔāḏām ("man", "human", later usually simply translated as the personal name "Adam") and אֲדָמָה, ʔăḏāmāh, 'ground, earth'.

καὶ ἔπλασεν ὁ θεὸς τὸν ἄνθρωπον χοῦν ἀπὸ τῆς γῆς·, 'And the god shaped the dust man from the earth' – LXX^{Swete}
καὶ ἔπλασεν ὁ θεὸς τὸν ἄνθρωπον χοῦν λαβών ἀπὸ τῆς γῆς, 'And the god shaped the man taking dust from the earth' – ABP
Formavit igitur Dominus Deus hominem de limo terrae, 'Therefore, (the) Lord God formed the human/man with the earth's mud/clay' – Vg^{Colunga&Turrado}

Genesis 2:8, see also Garden of Eden

גַּן־בְּעֵ֖דֶן מִקֶּ֑דֶם, gan-bəʔḗḏen miqqéḏem;, 'a garden in Eden in the east'
παράδεισον ἐν Ἔδεμ κατὰ ἀνατολάς, 'paradise in Edem according to the east' – LXX^{Swete}
παράδεισον ἐν Ἔδεν κατὰ ἀνατολάς, 'paradise in Eden according to the east' – ABP
paradisum voluptatis a principio, 'paradise of pleasure from the beginning' – Vg^{Colunga&Turrado}

Genesis 2:17, see also tree of the knowledge of good and evil

אֲכָלְךָ֥, ʔăḵāləḵā, 'that you eat [qal infinitive singular]' – WLC
φάγησθε, '[you] should eat [active plural]' – LXX^{Swete}
φάγητε, '[you] should eat [middle plural]' – ABP
comederis, '[you] shall/should eat [future active indicative/subjunctive singular)' – Vg^{Colunga&Turrado}

Genesis 2:18, see also Eve

אֶֽעֱשֶׂה־, ʔeʕĕśeh-, 'I will make' – WLC
ποιήσωμεν, 'let [us] make' – LXX^{Swete} LXX^{Rahlfs} ABP
faciamus, 'let [us] make' – Vg^{Colunga&Turrado}

=== Genesis 4 ===
Genesis 4:8

וַיֹּ֥אמֶר קַ֖יִן אֶל־הֶ֣בֶל אָחִ֑יו וֽ͏ַיְהִי֙ בִּהְיוֹתָ֣ם בַּשָּׂדֶ֔ה וַיָּ֥קָם קַ֛יִן אֶל־הֶ֥בֶל אָחִ֖יו וַיַּהַרְגֵֽהוּ, wayyṓʔmer Qáyin ʔel-Héḇel ʔāḥîw wayəhî bihəyôṯām baśśāḏeh wayyā́qām Qáyin ʔel-Héḇel ʔāḥîw wayyaharəḡēhû, 'and Cain said to Abel his brother and when they were in the field, Cain rose up against Abel his brother and killed him' — MT
ויאמר קין אל הבל אחיו נלכה השדה ויהי בהיותם בשדה ויקם קין אל הבל אחיו ויהרגהו, wyʔmr qyn ʔl hbl ʔḥyw nlkh hšdh wyhy bhywtm bšdh wyqm qyn ʔl hbl ʔḥyw wyhrghw, 'And Qen said to Ebel his brother: "Let us go out to the field." And when they were in the field, Qen set upon his brother Ebel and killed him' — SP
καὶ εἶπεν Καιν πρὸς Αβελ τὸν ἀδελφὸν αὐτοῦ διέλθωμεν εἰς τὸ πεδίον καὶ ἐγένετο ἐν τῷ εἶναι αὐτοὺς ἐν τῷ πεδίῳ καὶ ἀνέστη Καιν ἐπὶ Αβελ τὸν ἀδελφὸν αὐτοῦ καὶ ἀπέκτεινεν αὐτόν, 'And Kain said to his brother Habel, "Let us go through into the plain." And it came about when they were in the plain, that then Kain rose up against his brother Habel and killed him' — LXX

Genesis 4:12, see also Curse and mark of Cain

נָ֥ע וָנָ֖ד, nāʕ wānāḏ, 'a fugitive and a wanderer' – WLC
στένων καὶ τρέμων, 'moaning and trembling' – LXX^{Swete} LXX^{Rahlfs} ABP
vagus et profugus, 'wandering and (a) fugitive' – Vg^{Colunga&Turrado}

Compare Genesis 4:14

Genesis 4:13

וַיֹּ֥אמֶר קַ֖יִן אֶל־יְהוָ֑ה גָּדֹ֥ול עֲוֹנִ֖י מִנְּשֹֽׂא׃, wayyṓʔmer Qáyin ʔel-YHWH gāḏôl ʕăwōnî minnəśōʔ, 'And Cain said to the Lord, “My punishment is greater than I can bear!' – WLC
καὶ εἶπεν Κάιν πρὸς τὸν κύριον Μείζων ἡ αἰτία μου τοῦ ἀφεθῆναί με., 'And Cain said to (the) lord: My fault is (too) great to forgive me.' – LXX^{Swete} LXX^{Rahlfs} ABP
Dixitque Cain ad Dominum: Major est iniquitas mea, quam ut veniam merear., 'And Cain said to (the) Lord: My iniquity is greater than that [I] deserve pardon.' – Vg^{Colunga&Turrado}

Genesis 4:14

נָ֥ע וָנָ֖ד, nā' wā-nāḏ, 'a fugitive and a wanderer' – WLC
στένων καὶ τρέμων, 'moaning and trembling' – LXX^{Swete} LXX^{Rahlfs} ABP
vagus et profugus, 'wandering and (a) fugitive' – Vg^{Colunga&Turrado}

Compare Genesis 4:12

Genesis 4:15

שִׁבְעָתַ֖יִם יֻקָּ֑ם, šiḇʕāṯáyim yuqqām, 'sevenfold vengeance shall be taken [on him] or suffer sevenfold vengeance' – WLC
ἑπτὰ ἐκδικούμενα παραλύσει, 'will be disabled/paralysed seven [times] [by] punishing/avenging' – LXX^{Swete} LXX^{Rahlfs} ABP
septuplum punietur, 'shall be punished sevenfold' – Vg^{Colunga&Turrado}

Genesis 4:16, see also Land of Nod

בְּאֶֽרֶץ־נֹ֖וד קִדְמַת־עֵֽדֶן׃, bəʔéreṣ-nôḏ qiḏəmaṯ-ʕḗḏen, 'in [the] land (of) Nod east of Eden or [in] front [of] Eden' – WLC

קִדְמָה, qiḏəmāh can mean both "east" or "over against" or "in front of".

ἐν γῇ Ναὶδ κατέναντι Ἔδεμ., 'in [the] land (of) Naìd over against Edem.' – LXX^{Swete} LXX^{Rahlfs}
εν γη Ναϊδ κατέναντι Εδέν, 'in [land] (of) Naïd over against Eden.' – ABP
in terra ad orientalem plagam Eden., 'in (the) land to the eastern region (of) Eden.' – Vg^{Colunga&Turrado}

Genesis 4:20

וּמִקְנֶֽה׃, ûmiqəneh, 'and [raise] livestock' – WLC
κτηνοτρόφων, 'grazing cattle' – LXX^{Swete} LXX^{Rahlfs} ABP
atque pastorum., 'and of (the) shepherds.' – Vg^{Colunga&Turrado}

=== Genesis 5 ===
Genesis 5:1, see also Generations of Adam

זֶ֣ה סֵ֔פֶר תֹּולְדֹ֖ת אָדָ֑ם, zeh sḗp̄er tôləḏōṯ ʔāḏām, 'This [is] the book of the generations/genealogy (of) man or Adam' – WLC
Αὕτη ἡ βίβλος γενέσεως ἀνθρώπων., 'This [is] the book of [the] origin/birth of men or humans' – LXX^{Swete} LXX^{Rahlfs} ABP
Hic est liber generationis Adam., 'This is [the] book of [the] generation/offspring (of) Adam.' – Vg^{Colunga&Turrado}

=== Genesis 6 ===
Genesis 6:3

וַיֹּ֣אמֶר יְהוָ֗ה לֹֽא־יָד֨וֹן רוּחִ֤י בָֽאָדָם֙ לְעֹלָ֔ם, wayyṓʔmer YHWH lōʔ-yāḏôn rûḥî ḇāʔāḏām ləʕōlām, 'Then the Lord said, "My spirit shall not strive with (lit. 'judge, execute judgement on') man forever"' — MT, SP
καὶ εἶπεν κύριος ὁ θεός οὐ μὴ καταμείνῃ τὸ πνεῦμά μου ἐν τοῖς ἀνθρώποις τούτοις εἰς τὸν αἰῶνα, 'And the Lord God said, "My spirit shall not abide in these humans forever"' — LXX
לא ידור רוחי באדם לעולם, lʔ ydwr rwḥy bʔdm lʕwlm, 'my spirit will not dwell in humankind forever' — 4Q252

Genesis 6:6, see also Genesis flood narrative

וַיִּנָּ֣חֶם יְהוָ֔ה כִּֽי־עָשָׂ֥ה אֶת־הָֽאָדָ֖ם, wayyinnā́ḥem YHWH kî-ʕāśāh ʔeṯ-hāʔāḏām, 'And the Lord was sorry that he had made humans on the earth' – WLC
καὶ ἐνεθυμήθη ὁ θεὸς ὅτι ἐποίησεν τὸν ἄνθρωπον, 'and the god reflected upon / pondered that [he] made the man' – LXX^{Swete} LXX^{Rahlfs} ABP
poenituit eum quod hominum fecisset, 'he regretted which/because/that/what [he] had made of men/humans' – Vg^{Colunga&Turrado}

Genesis 6:6

וַיִּתְעַצֵּ֖ב אֶל־לִבֹּֽו׃, wayyiṯəʔaṣṣēḇ ʔel-libbô., 'and [he] was grieved in his heart.' – WLC
καὶ διενοήθη., 'and [he] considered it.' – LXX^{Swete} LXX^{Rahlfs} ABP
Et tactus dolore cordis intrinsecus, 'And touched by [the] inner pain of [the] heart' – Vg^{Colunga&Turrado}

Genesis 6:14, see also Noah's Ark

עֲשֵׂ֤ה לְךָ֙ תֵּבַ֣ת עֲצֵי־גֹ֔פֶר, ʕăśēh ləḵā tēḇaṯ ʕăṣê-ḡṓp̄er, 'Make for yourself [a] box/basket of gopher wood' – WLC
ποίησον οὖν σεαυτῷ κιβωτὸν ἐκ ξύλων τετραγώνων·, 'Then make for yourself [a] wooden box out of four-cornered wood!' – LXX^{Swete} LXX^{Rahlfs} ABP
Fac tibi arcam de lignis laevigatis;, 'Make for yourself [a] chest/box of polished wood;' – Vg^{Colunga&Turrado}

In other contexts, each of the Hebrew, Greek and Latin words are used to describe a (wooden) box, basket or chest for storage. The traditionally used English word ark derives from the Latin word arca (from the verb arceō, "to keep off/away/close"), which outside of the Bible never refers to any kind of ship, but always a relatively small object for keeping items. The same nouns are used for the Ark of the Covenant. The Hebrew noun H1613 גֹ֔פֶר gopher is a hapax legomenon.

=== Genesis 7 ===
Genesis 7:9

שְׁנַ֨יִם שְׁנַ֜יִם בָּ֧אוּ אֶל־נֹ֛חַ אֶל־הַתֵּבָ֖ה זָכָ֣ר וּנְקֵבָ֑ה כּֽ͏ַאֲשֶׁ֛ר צִוָּ֥ה אֱלֹהִ֖ים אֶת־נֹֽחַ׃, šənáyim šənáyim bā́ʔû ʔel-Nō(a)ḥ ʔel-hattēḇāh zāḵār ûnəqēḇāh kaʔăšer ṣiwwāh ʔĕlōhîm ʔeṯ-Nō(a)ḥ, 'two and two, male and female, went into the ark with Noah, as God had commanded Noah' — MT
שנים שנים באו אל נח אל התבה זכר ונקבה כאשר צוה יהוה את נח, šnym šnym bʔw ʔl nḥ ʔl htbh zkr wnqbh kʔšr ṣwh yhwh ʔt nḥ, 'two and two came to Na into the ark, male and female, as Shema commanded Na' — SP

=== Genesis 34 ===
Genesis 34 in Brenton's Septuagint translation (1879)

Genesis 34:2

חֲמ֛וֹר הַֽחִוִּ֖י, ḥămôr haḥiwwî, 'Hamor the Hivite' – WLC
Ἐμμὼρ ὁ Χορραῖος, 'Emmor the Hurrian' – A LXX^{Swete}
Εμμώρ ο Ευαίος, 'Emmor the Evite' – Brenton ABP
Hemor Hevaei, 'Hemor of the Hevea' – Vg^{Colunga&Turrado}

Genesis 34:3 (twice)

הַֽנַּעֲרָ֔, hannaʕărā, 'the youth' [H5288] – MT
הנערה, hnʕrh, 'the young woman' [H5291] – SP
παρθένον/παρθένου, 'young woman or virgin' – LXX^{Swete} Brenton ABP
omitted – Vg^{Colunga&Turrado}

Genesis 34:3

עַל־, ʕal-, 'to' [H5921] – MT
אל, ʔl, 'towards' [H413] – SP
κατὰ, 'against/down/according to' – LXX^{Swete} Brenton ABP
omitted – Vg^{Colunga&Turrado}

Genesis 34:7, see also Rape in the Hebrew Bible § Genesis 34 § Historical-ethical analysis

וְכֵ֖ן לֹ֥א יֵעָשֶֽׂה׃, wəḵēn lōʔ yēʕāśeh., 'and such [a thing] should not be done' – WLC
καὶ οὐχ οὕτως ἔσται., 'And [it] shall not be thus.' LXX^{Swete} Brenton ABP
rem illicitam perpetrasset., '[he] had perpetrated/committed [an] illicit/unlawful act.' – Vg^{Colunga&Turrado}

Genesis 34:9

תִּקְח֥וּ לָכֶֽם׃, tiqḥû lāḵem, 'take to/for yourselves' – WLC
λάβετε τοῖς υἱοῖς ὑμῶν, 'take for your sons.' – LXX^{Swete} Brenton ABP
accipite, 'accept' – Vg^{Colunga&Turrado}

Genesis 34:14

וַיֹּאמְר֣וּ אֲלֵיהֶ֗ם, wayyōʔmərû ʔălēhem, 'And they said to them' – WLC
καὶ εἶπαν αὐτοῖς Συμεὼν καὶ Λευὶ οἱ ἀδελφοὶ Δείνας υἱοὶ δὲ Λείας, 'And Simeon and Levi the brothers of Dinah sons of Leah said to them' – LXX^{Swete}
καὶ εἶπαν αὐτοῖς Συμεὼν καὶ Λευὶ οἱ ἀδελφοὶ Δείνας/Δίνας, 'And Simeon and Levi the brothers of Dinah said to them' – Brenton ABP
omitted – Vg^{Colunga&Turrado}

== See also ==
- List of Hebrew Bible manuscripts

== Bibliography ==
- Biblos.com & Helps Ministries (2011–2018). "Interlinear Bible (Westminster Leningrad Codex – English)". Biblehub.com.
- Brenton, Lancelot Charles Lee (1851). "Brenton's Septuagint Translation". Biblehub.com.
- Brenton, Lancelot Charles Lee (1879). The Septuagint version of the OT, with an English translation (PDF). London: Samuel Bagster. p. 1156.
- Florentin, Moshe; Tal, Abraham (2024). The Samaritan Pentateuch: An English Translation with a Parallel Annotated Hebrew Text.
- Hiebert, Robert (2009). A New English Translation of the Septuagint.
- Rahlfs, Alfred (1935). "Γένεσις (Genesis Rahlfs)". Alfred Rahlfs' edition of the Septuagint (in Greek). Greek Wikisource.
- Scholz, Susanne (2021). Sacred Witness. Rape in the Hebrew Bible. Fortress Press. ISBN 978-1-5064-8203-3. (E-book edition)
- Swete, Henry Barclay (1930). "Swete's Septuagint". Biblehub.com.
- Emanuel Tov, The Text-Critical Use of the Septuagint in Biblical Research (TCU), 1981 (1st edition), 1997 (2nd edition), 2015 (3rd edition).
- Emanuel Tov, Textual Criticism of the Hebrew Bible (TCHB), 1992 (1st edition), 2001 (2nd edition), 2012 (3rd edition).
- Emanuel Tov, Textual Criticism of the Hebrew Bible, Qumran, Septuagint: Collected Writings, Volume 3 (2015).
- Tov, Emanuel (1999). "38. The Septuagint Additions ('Miscellanies') in 1 Kings 2 (3 Reigns 2)". The Greek and Hebrew Bible: Collected Essays on the Septuagint. Vetus Testamentum Supplements. Vol. 72. Leiden: Brill. doi:10.1163/9789004275973_039. ISBN 978-90-04-27597-3.
- van de Giessen, J. P. (2003). "Index Bijbelverzen". bijbelaantekeningen.nl (in Dutch).
- Van der Pool, Charles (1996). "Apostolic Bible Polyglot (ABP)". Biblehub.com.
- Wells, Bruce (2020). "On the Beds of a Woman: The Leviticus Texts on Same-Sex Relations Reconsidered". Sexuality and Law in the Torah. Bloomsbury Publishing. pp. 123–158. ISBN 978-0-567-68160-7.
