= Genesis 1:4 =

Fourth verse of the first chapter of the Book of Genesis

- ← 1:3 1:5 →
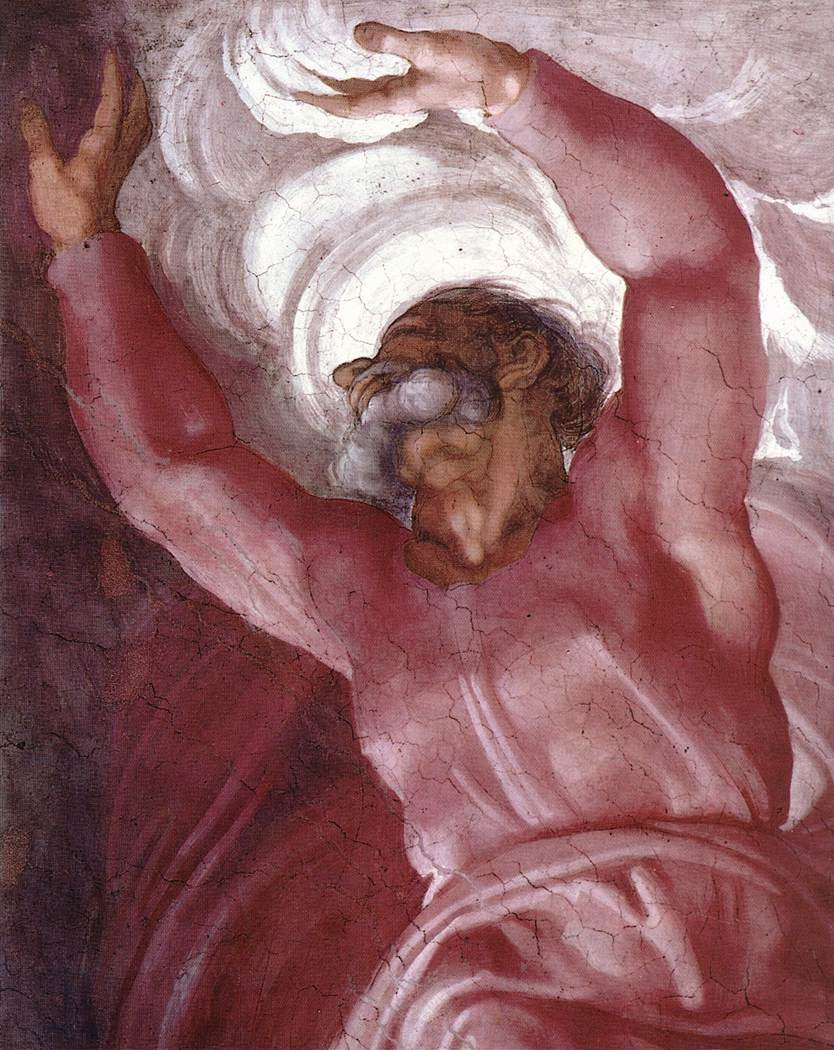
- Detail of Michelangelo's Separation of Light from Darkness, part of the Sistine Chapel ceiling.
- Book: Book of Genesis
- Hebrew Bible part: Torah
- Order in the Hebrew part: 1
- Christian Bible part: Old Testament
- Order in the Christian part: 1

Genesis 1:4 is the fourth verse of the first chapter of the Book of Genesis. It is the response to God's command in verse 3, "Let there be light." It is part of the Genesis creation narrative within the Torah portion Bereshit. (Genesis 1:1–6:8) The verse states that the light was good, and that God divided or separated the light from the darkness (see list of translations below). It has been interpreted in different ways, and illustrated by artists such as Michelangelo.

== Interpretations ==
The reference to goodness here reflects the fact that Hebrew thought had no place for believing the material universe to be evil in itself.

The division between light and darkness in this verse has been interpreted both literally and metaphorically.

=== Division of literal light ===
Gerald Schroeder, in his book The Science of God: The Convergence of Scientific and Biblical Wisdom, claims that this verse describes literal phenomena within physical cosmology, comparing it to inflation.

Commentator Paul Kissling writes that the first part of the verse indicates that "the material universe is good, not evil; impersonal, not personal" and that the second part reflects the orderly nature of the physical universe.

Franz Delitzsch and others have seen the verse as ushering in the alternation of light and darkness, or the creation of time itself.

=== Division of metaphorical light ===
Augustine of Hippo, in his City of God, interprets the verse as describing a division between the holy angels and the unclean angels, pointing out that existence of the sun, moon, and stars implied a division between physical light and dark, but "between that light, which is the holy company of the angels spiritually radiant with the illumination of the truth, and that opposing darkness, which is the noisome foulness of the spiritual condition of those angels who are turned away from the light of righteousness, only [God] Himself could divide." Augustine follows this by suggesting that "God saw the light that it was good" refers to the moral goodness of the angels.

The Zohar contains a number of interpretations of this verse, including the suggestion that "God saw the light that it was good" means that "the universe became lighted up and pervaded throughout with the divine life which preserves it for the common weal and happiness of created and animated beings."

Rashi gives an Aggadic interpretation of this verse, indicating that the light is set apart for the righteous in the World to Come.

=== Framework interpretation ===
The framework interpretation sees the division of light from darkness as part of a literary structure, parallel to the later separation of sea from sky and land from sea.

== Artwork ==
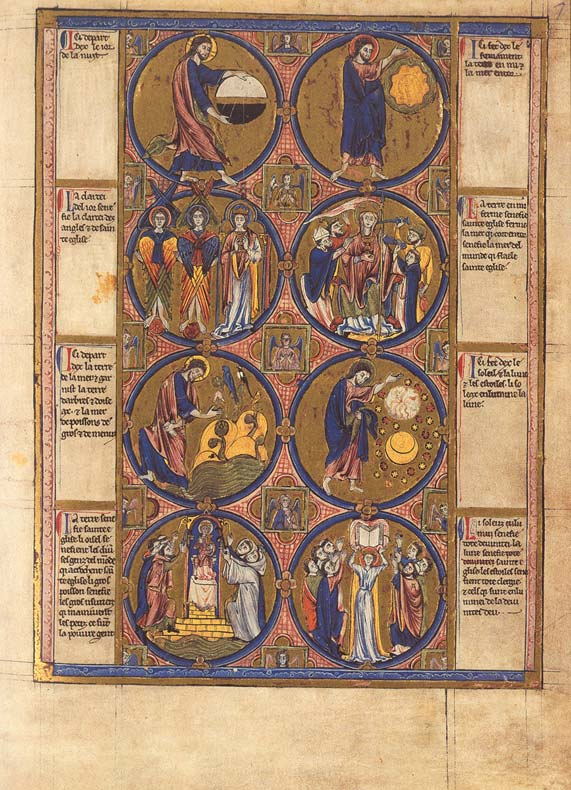
In the top left of this page from an illuminated manuscript (c. 1250), God divides the light from the darkness.

There are many illustrations of this verse, including the Separation of Light from Darkness (part of the Sistine Chapel ceiling) by Michelangelo.

== Text ==
Version	Text
Hebrew	וַיַּרְא אֱלֹהִים אֶת הָאוֹר כִּי טוֹב וַיַּבְדֵּל אֱלֹהִים בֵּין הָאוֹר וּבֵין הַחֹשֶׁךְ Wayyarə’ ’ĕlōhîm ’eṯ-hā’ôr, kî-ṭôḇ; wayyaḇədēl ’ĕlōhîm bên hā’ôr ûḇên haḥōšeḵ.
American Standard Version	"And God saw the light, that it was good: and God divided the light from the darkness."
Bible in Basic English	"And God, looking on the light, saw that it was good: and God made a division between the light and the dark,"
Darby Bible	"And God saw the light that it was good; and God divided between the light and the darkness."
Jewish Publication Society (3rd ed.)	"And God saw the light, that it was good; and God divided the light from the darkness."
King James Version	"And God saw the light, that it was good: and God divided the light from the darkness."
New King James Version	"And God saw the light, that it was good; and God divided the light from the darkness."
Young's Literal Translation	"And God seeth the light that 'it is' good, and God separateth between the light and the darkness,"

== See also ==
- Apollo 8 Genesis reading from lunar orbit, December 24, 1968

Preceded by Genesis 1:3	Book of Genesis	Succeeded by Genesis 1:5
