= Tohu wa-bohu =

Biblical Hebrew phrase

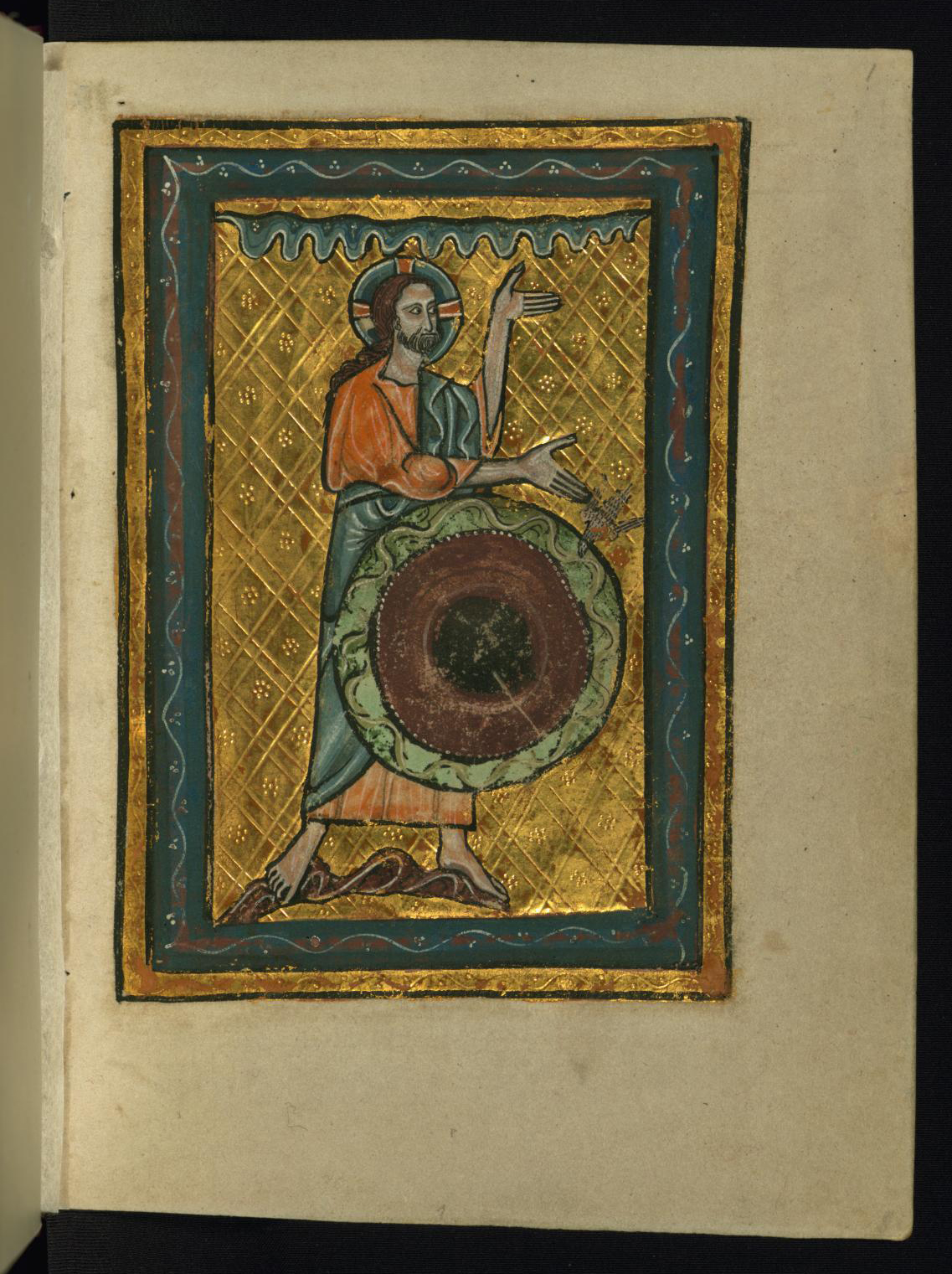
Miniature of the first two Days of Creation (separation of light and darkness; separation of the primordial waters by the firmament), William de Brailes Ms. W.106 (c. 1250)

Tohu wa-bohu or Tohu va-Vohu (Biblical Hebrew: תֹהוּ וָבֹהוּ, romanized: ṯōhū wāḇōhū) is a Biblical Hebrew phrase found in the Genesis creation narrative (Genesis 1:2), which describes the condition of the earth ('aretz) immediately before the creation of light in Genesis 1:3.

Numerous interpretations of this phrase are made by various theological sources. The King James Version translation of the phrase is "without form, and void", corresponding to the Septuagint's ἀόρατος καὶ ἀκατασκεύαστος (aoratos kai akataskeuastos) and, in the Vulgate, inanis et vacua, "unseen and unformed".

== Text ==
וְהָאָ֗רֶץ הָיְתָ֥ה תֹ֙הוּ֙ וָבֹ֔הוּ וְחֹ֖שֶׁךְ עַל־פְּנֵ֣י תְהֹ֑ום וְר֣וּחַ אֱלֹהִ֔ים מְרַחֶ֖פֶת עַל־פְּנֵ֥י הַמָּֽיִם

— Genesis 1:2, Westminster Leningrad Codex

Now the earth was formless and empty, darkness was over the surface of the deep, and the spirit of God was hovering over the waters.

— Genesis 1:2, New International Version

The words tohu and bohu also occur in parallel in Isaiah 34:11, which the King James Version translates with the words "confusion" and "emptiness".

The two Hebrew words are properly segolates, spelled tohuw and bohuw. Hebrew tohuw translates to "wasteness, that which is laid waste, desert; emptiness, vanity; nothing". Tohuw is frequently used in the Book of Isaiah in the sense of "vanity", but bohuw occurs nowhere else in the Hebrew Bible (outside of Genesis 1:2, the passage in Isaiah 34:11 mentioned above, and in Jeremiah 4:23, which is a reference to Genesis 1:2), its use alongside tohu being mere paronomasia, and is given the equivalent translation of "emptiness, voidness".

== Rabbinical interpretation ==
In the early rabbinical period, the verse was a point of contention regarding the question of creatio ex nihilo. In Genesis Rabbah 1:14, Rabbi Akiva "refutes both the existence of primordial matter and the view that God was not the sole creator". In Genesis Rabbah 2:2, the amoraim Abbahu and Shimon ben Pazi give analogies in which tohu wabohu means "bewildered and astonished" (mentally formless and void), referring to the Earth's confusion after, having been created simultaneously with the Heavens in Genesis 1:1, it now immediately plays an inferior role.

In the 12th century, Abraham bar Hiyya was the first to interpret the tohu and bohu of Gen. 1:2 as meaning "matter" and "form", and the same idea appears in the anonymous Bahir 2.9–10, which was probably edited by the Hachmei Provence.

Possibly related to the concept of "formless and void" is the Yesod hapashut (Hebrew: יְסוֹד הפשוט, lit. 'simple element') in the Kabbalah, in which "everything is united as one, without differentiation". ArtScroll's Stone Edition Chumash translates the phrase as "astonishingly empty". ArtScroll translates in accordance to Rashi, the most famous medieval Jewish biblical commentator on the Torah.

== Use in modern culture ==
The phrase is featured on the front of Godspeed You! Black Emperor's EP Slow Riot for New Zero Kanada, referring to the use of the phrase in Jeremiah 4:23. Jeremiah 4:23-27 is shown on the inner-sleeve of the album cover.

== See also ==
- Abzu
- Chaos (cosmogony)
- Cosmic ocean
- Hundun
- Tehom
- Tohu and Tikun
- The Void (philosophy)
