= Genesis 1:5 =

Fifth verse of the first chapter of the Book of Genesis

- ← 1:4 1:6 →
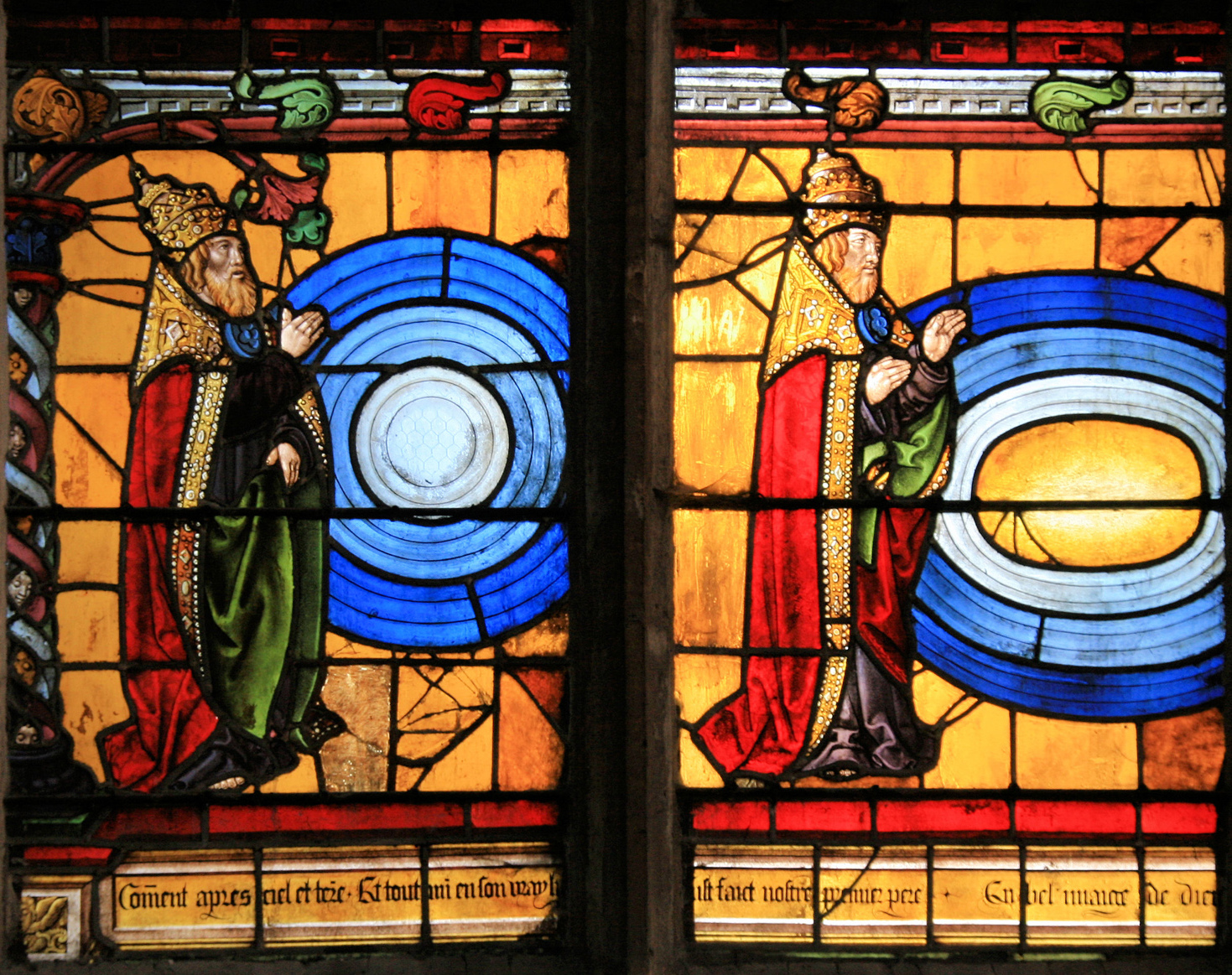
- Stained-glass depiction of the first day of Creation, Sainte-Madeleine Church, Troyes.
- Book: Book of Genesis
- Hebrew Bible part: Torah
- Order in the Hebrew part: 1
- Christian Bible part: Old Testament
- Order in the Christian part: 1

Genesis 1:5 is the fifth verse in the first chapter of the Book of Genesis, part of the Genesis creation narrative. In this verse, God names the newly created day and night. Interpretation of this passage hinges on the interpretation of Genesis 1:4. "Evening and morning" bring the narrative of the first day of Creation to a close, and there are also multiple interpretations of this phrase.

== Interpretations ==
=== Day and night ===
Commentator Paul Kissling writes that, by naming the day and the night, God reveals his sovereign power over them, seeing the light and darkness here as purely physical. In the Ancient Near East, "the act of giving a name meant, above all, the exercise of a sovereign right." Galia Patt-Shamir points out that the "power of names and naming" is displayed here, but that later in the narrative this power of naming is also granted to Adam, the first human.

According to John Calvin, God is here instituting "a regular vicissitude of days and nights."

The Zohar, on the other hand, interprets the verse as describing an emanation which would be "the foundation root of universal life."

=== Evening and morning ===
==== The definition of "evening" and morning" without the Sun ====
The verse ends with a reference to evening and morning, which bring the first day of Creation to a close. This raises the question of how evening and morning are possible in the absence of the yet-to-be-created Sun.

Augustine of Hippo, in his City of God, writes "our ordinary days have no evening but by the setting, and no morning but by the rising, of the sun; but the first three days of all were passed without sun, since it is reported to have been made on the fourth day." He explains the dilemma by interpreting the evening and morning in a metaphorical sense.

==== Length of day debate ====
Franz Delitzsch sees the evening and morning as marking the end of a "day" which is aeons in length, while others have seen it as marking a literal 24-hour day. Theistic evolution and day-age creationism follow the first interpretation, while young Earth creationism follows the second. Still others give a literary interpretation, in which the process of Creation is described in human terms, using the analogy of the working week.

==== Start of day interpretation ====
In Jewish tradition, the fact that evening is listed first here has led to the idea that the day begins at sunset.

== Text ==
Version	Text
Hebrew	וַיִּקְרָא אֱלֹהִים לָאוֹר יוֹם וְלַחֹשֶׁךְ קָרָא לָיְלָה וַיְהִי עֶרֶב וַיְהִי בֹקֶר יוֹם אֶחָד׃ Wayyiqərā’ ’ĕlōhîm lā’ôr "yômm" wəlaḥōšeḵ qārā’ "lāyəlāh". Wayəhî-‘ereḇ wayəhî-ḇōqer, yôm ’eḥāḏ.
Greek	Καὶ εἶπεν ὁ Θεός· γενηθήτω στερέωμα ἐν μέσῳ τοῦ ὕδατος καὶ ἔστω διαχωρίζον ἀνὰ μέσον ὕδατος καὶ ὕδατος. καὶ ἐγένετο οὕτως. Kaí eípen o Theós: genithíto steréoma en méso toú ýdatos kaí ésto diachorízon aná méson ýdatos kaí ýdatos. kaí egéneto oútos.
Latin	Appellavitque Deus lucem Diem et tenebras Noctem. Factumque est vespere et mane, dies unus.
World English Bible	"God called the light "day," and the darkness he called "night." There was evening and there was morning, one day."
American Standard Version	"And God called the light Day, and the darkness he called Night. And there was evening and there was morning, one day."
Bible in Basic English	"Naming the light, Day, and the dark, Night. And there was evening and there was morning, the first day."
Darby Bible	"And God called the light Day, and the darkness he called Night. And there was evening, and there was morning the first day. "
King James Version	"And God called the light Day, and the darkness he called Night. And the evening and the morning were the first day."
Webster's Bible Translation	"And God called the light Day, and the darkness he called Night: and the evening and the morning were the first day."
Jewish Publication Society (3rd ed.)	"And God called the light Day, and the darkness He called Night. And there was evening and there was morning, one day."
Young's Literal Translation	"and God calleth to the light 'Day,' and to the darkness He hath called 'Night;' and there is an evening, and there is a morning -- day one."

== See also ==
- Apollo 8 Genesis reading from lunar orbit, December 24, 1968

Preceded by Genesis 1:4	Book of Genesis	Succeeded by Genesis 1:6
