= Tehom =

Primordial waters of creation in the Bible

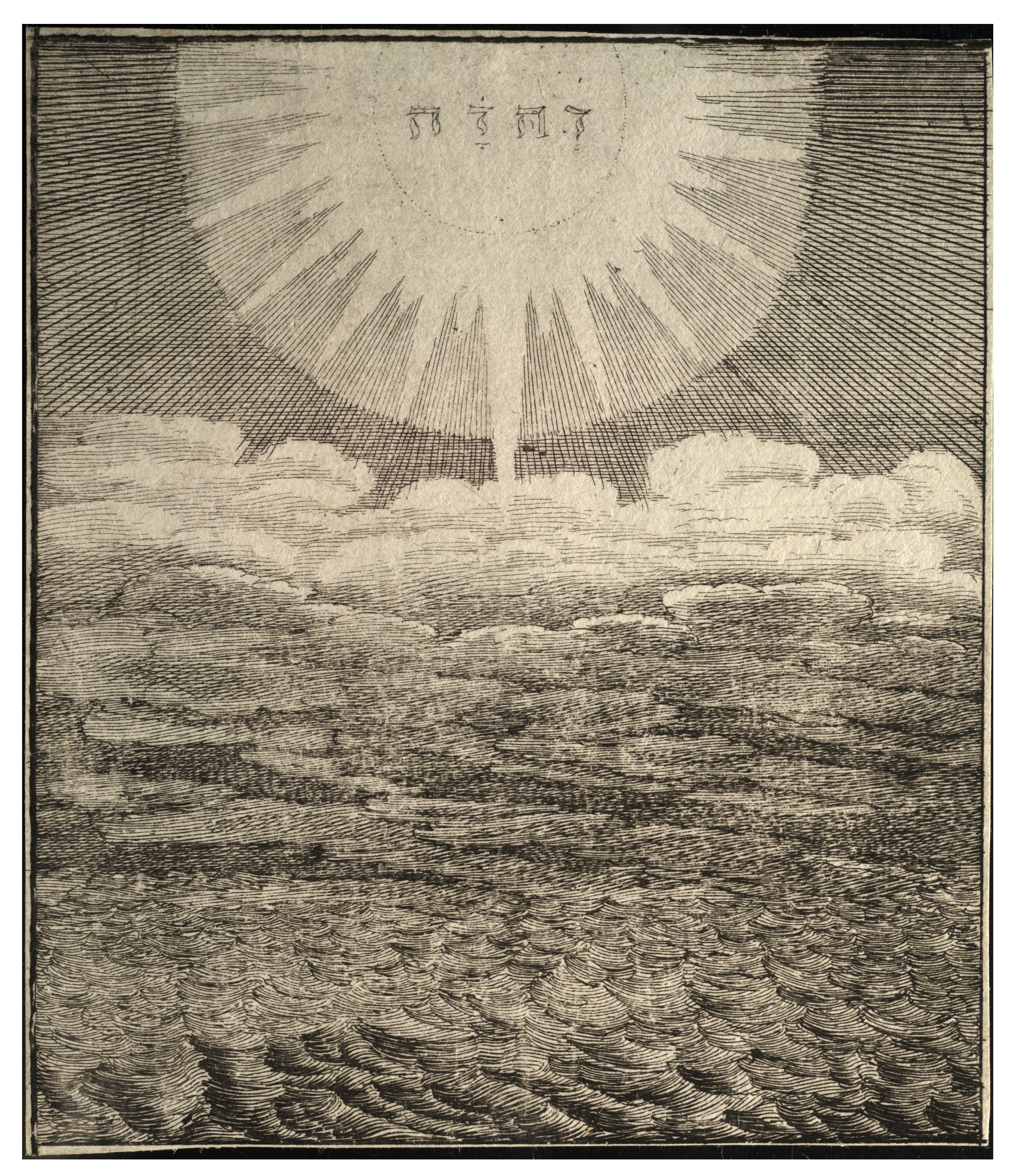
Illustration by Wenceslas Hollar: the Spirit of God (with Tetragrammaton) moves over the face of the deep.

Tehom (Hebrew: תְּהוֹם təhôm) is a Northwest Semitic and Biblical Hebrew word meaning "the deep" or "abyss" (literally "the deeps"). It is used to describe the primeval ocean and the post-creation waters of the earth. It is a cognate of the Akkadian words tiāmtum and tâmtum as well as Ugaritic t-h-m which have similar meanings. According to a theological dictionary, tehom derives from a Semitic root which denoted the sea as a non-personified entity with mythological import.

In the Hebrew, tehom doesn't use a definitive article, indicating its original conception may have been for a deity, which was common in Canaanite, Egyptian and Mesopotamian conceptions. This ancient pattern of a creative act involves the separation of the primeval waters, bringing about creation and order to the world.

== Genesis ==
Tehom is mentioned in Genesis 1:2, where it is translated as "deep":

And the earth was without form, and void; and darkness was upon the face of the deep. And the Spirit of God moved upon the face of the waters.

— King James Version

The same word is used for the origin of Noah's flood in Genesis 7:11:

In the six hundredth year of Noah's life, in the second month, the seventeenth day of the month, the same day were all the fountains of the great deep broken up, and the windows of heaven were opened.

== Gnosticism ==
Gnostics used Genesis 1:2 to propose that the original creator deity, called the Pléroma "Totality" or Bythós "Deep," preexisted Elohim and gave rise to such later divinities and spirits by way of emanations, progressively more distant and removed from the original form.

In Mandaean cosmology, the Sea of Suf is a primordial sea in the World of Darkness.

== Kabbalah ==
Tehom is also mentioned as the first of seven "Infernal Habitations" that correspond to the ten qlippoth (literally "peels") of Jewish Kabbalistic tradition, often in place of Sheol.

== Sanchuniathon ==
Robert R. Stieglitz stated that Eblaitic texts demonstrate the equation of the goddess Berouth in the mythology of Sanchuniathon with Ugaritic thmt and Akkadian Tiâmat, as the sea was called tihamatum, and also buʾrâtum = Canaanite beʾerôt ("fountains").

== See also ==
- Abyss (religion)
- Abzu
- Atum
- Cosmic Ocean
- Nu (mythology)
- Tohu wa-bohu
- Tiamat
