= Francisco de Holanda =

Portuguese artist and architect

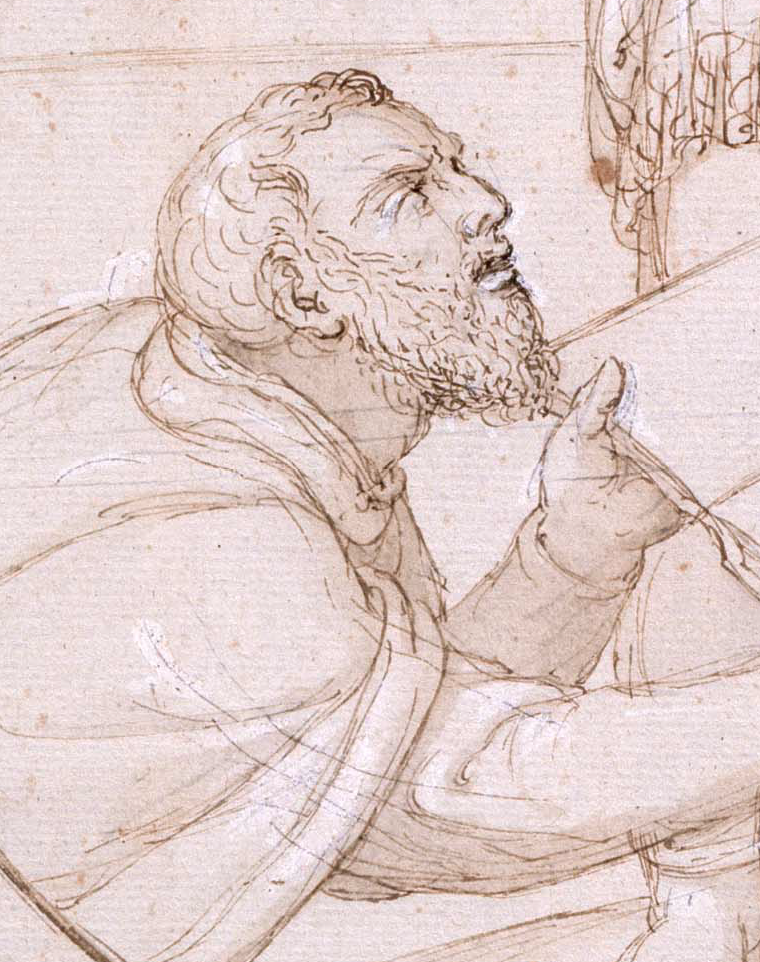
- Self-portrait (c. 1573), the artist presenting his book
- Born: c. 1517; Lisbon, Kingdom of Portugal
- Died: 19 June 1585 (aged 67); Lisbon, Kingdom of Portugal
- Occupations: Architect, sculptor, painter, essayist, historian

Francisco de Holanda (Note: 16th century spelling of surname was d'Olanda.) (c. 1517 – 19 June 1585) was a Portuguese artist, architect, and art essayist. He served as a court painter for the kings João III of Portugal and Sebastião of Portugal. He was an influential figure in the Portuguese Renaissance. After a stay in Italy, he returned to Portugal and contributed to the propagation of the Italianate style mainly through his writings. In 1548 he completed a manuscript entitled Da pintura antigua (Of Ancient Painting) which was the first treatise on painting written in the Iberian peninsula.

== Biography ==
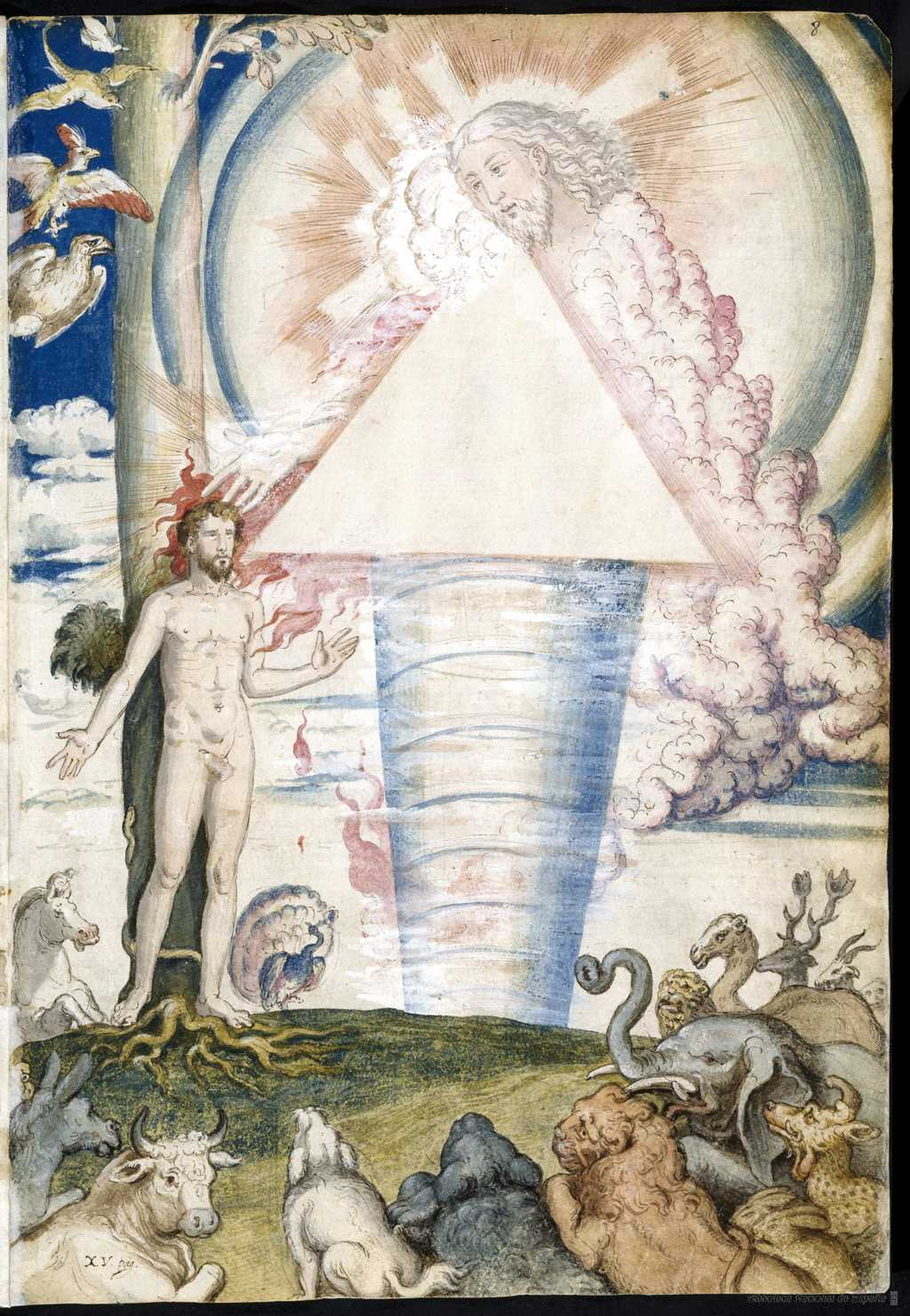
de Holanda, Francisco, "The Creation of Man", De aetatibus mundi imagines (detail)

Francisco de Holanda was born in Lisbon, Portugal in 1517, and began his career as an illuminator at the age of 20. His father, António de Holanda, was also a royal illuminator. Francisco studied in Italy between 1538 and 1547, where he frequented the circle of Vittoria Colonna, one of the notables of the Italian Renaissance. Colonna provided him with access to some of the greatest artists of the period such as Parmigianino, Giambologna, and most importantly, Michelangelo, who introduced him to Classicism.

At the age of 30, he returned to Portugal and obtained various commissions from the reigning King of Portugal, the Cardinal-Archbishop of Évora, and later from King John III (1521–57) and King Sebastian (1568–78). Francisco died in Lisbon, Portugal on June 19, 1585, at the age of 68.

== Aesthetic values ==
A copy of Francisco's portrait of King John III of Portugal

Francisco de Holanda embraced the aesthetic values of the Renaissance. His paintings strongly expressed the desire to stimulate personal originality and provide a link between nature (the pure mirror of the Creator) and the ancients – immortal masters of greatness, symmetry, perfection and decorum. Most of these objectives can be seen in his three-part treatise on the nature of art, "On Ancient Painting" (Da Pintura Antiga), 1548. The second part of this treatise contains four dialogues, supposedly with Michelangelo. Here, his passion for Classicism was brought to the fore, as he communicated the essence of the work of Michelangelo and of the contemporary artistic movement in Rome.

Francisco distinguished himself through his series of drawings at the command of the Portuguese king, João III. These drawings were devoted to the antiquities of Italy and were sketched between 1540 and 1547, through his studies on the revival of the archaeological heritage of Rome and on Italian art in the first half of the 16th century.

Francisco was the creator of the façade of the Church of Our Lady of Grace (Igreja de Nossa Senhora da Graça) in Évora. He also painted some portraits, not all of which survived.

Francisco wrote the first essay on urbanism in the Iberian Peninsula, "On the construction lacking to the city of Lisbon" (Da fábrica que falece à cidade de Lisboa ) and also created the structures of De aetatibus mundi imagines and Antigualhas.

He represented the intelligible reality of the Holy Trinity through a "hypothetical" syntax of geometrical figures. He insisted on the contrast between the ideal plane, the incorporeal form and the "imperfect copy in the terrestrial zone". His visual language demonstrated a mixture of Neoplatonism, Christian Kabbalah and finally Lullism. In education, Francisco de Holanda emphasized mathematics and geometry, subsequently anticipating Clavius's reforms of the late 16th century. Sylvie Deswarte said that "Francisco de Holanda gives a privileged place to cosmography and astrology in the education of the painter. On par with geometry, mathematics and perspective, he recommended them… in order to reach the heavens in the hope of one day arriving to the Empyrean and realising celestial works."

== Francisco's works ==
Francisco de Holanda was the author of

- De aetatibus mundi imagines (1543–73)
- Da pintura antiga (Lisbon, 1548; in which he attributes the Saint Vincent Panels)
  - Part II: Diálogos de Roma
- Do tirar polo natural (1549)
- Da fábrica que falece à cidade de Lisboa (Lisbon, 1571)
- De quanto serve a ciência do desenho e entendimento da arte da pintura, na república christâ assim na paz como na guerra (Lisbon, 1571)
- Antigualhas de Roma
