= De Aetatibus Mundi Imagines =

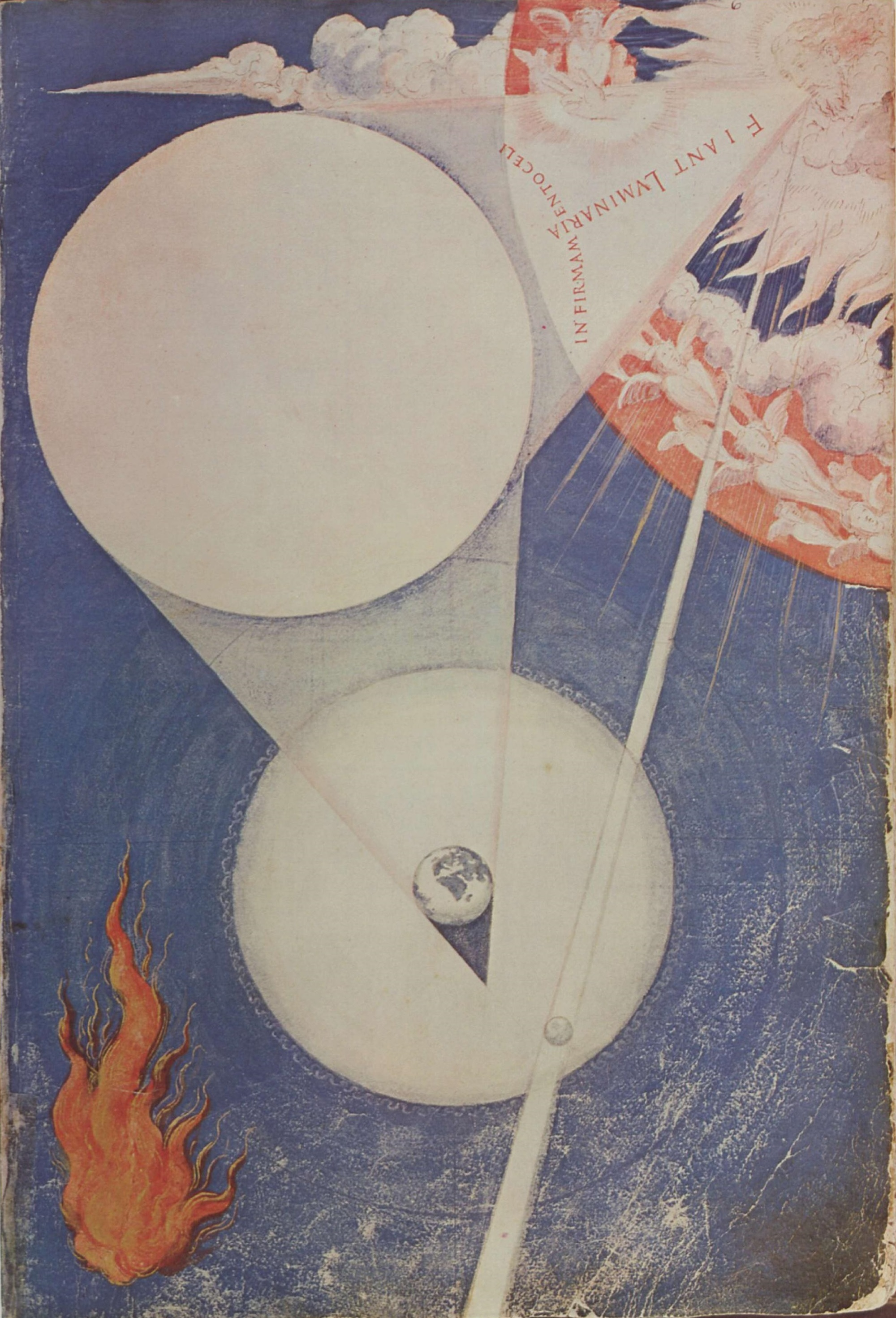
- "The Creation of the Sun and the Moon"
- Author: Francisco de Holanda
- Illustrator: Francisco de Holanda
- Language: Latin
- Published: 1545
- Publication place: Portugal
- Media type: laid paper
- Pages: 189

De Aetatibus Mundi Imagines is a literary and pictorial sketchbook. The author and illustrator of the manuscript was Francisco de Holanda (1517–84).

It is a manuscript of 189 pages. There are brush, pen, pencil black, brown and brown ink, gouache and gold colors, on beige laid paper. The theme is the ages of the world, illustrated with scenes from the Christian Bible.

Francisco de Holanda stayed in Rome, with the Portuguese ambassador, from 1538 until 1540. He was a friend of Michelangelo. There were 3 codices, and the third survives.
