= Genesis 1:3 =

Third verse of the first chapter in the Book of Genesis

- ← 1:2 1:4 →
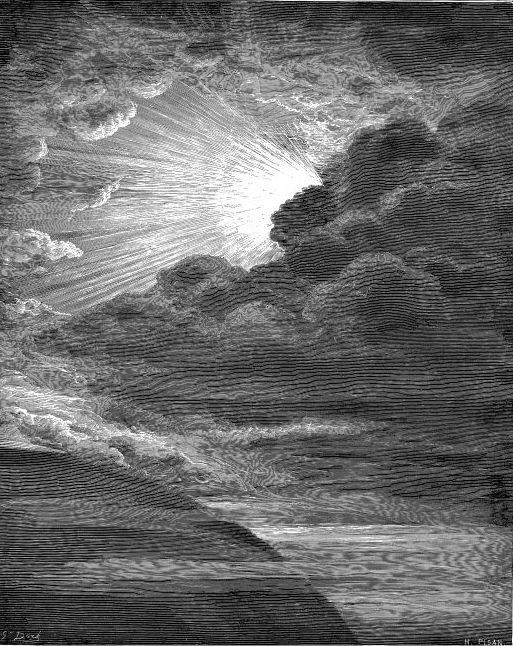
- Creation of Light, by Gustave Doré.
- Book: Book of Genesis
- Hebrew Bible part: Torah
- Order in the Hebrew part: 1
- Christian Bible part: Old Testament
- Order in the Christian part: 1

Genesis 1:3 is the third verse of the first chapter in the Book of Genesis. In it God made light by declaration: God said, 'Let there be light,' and there was light. It is a part of the Torah portion known as Bereshit (Genesis 1:1-6:8).

"Let there be light" has entered into common usage as a phrase, as has "in the beginning", which appears in Genesis 1:1.

== Interpretations ==
=== By a word ===
The words "let there be light" are the first divine words in the Bible. The Latin for "let there be light" is "fiat lux," and this description of creation by command has led to the theological phrase "creation by fiat." In the words of Peter Kreeft, God "simply spoke... and it came to be".

Augustine of Hippo, in his City of God, sees this verse as indicating "not only that God had made the world, but also that He had made it by the word", adding that this verse shows that there is "no skill more efficacious than the word of God".

Gerhard von Rad considers the implication to be "the most radical distinction between Creator and creature. Creation cannot be even remotely considered an emanation from God; it is not somehow an overflow or reflection of his being, i.e., of his divine nature, but is rather a product of his personal will."

The divine "fiat lux" in this passage has "exerted a powerful influence on the English poetic tradition". The many examples include John Dryden's lines "Thus Britain's Basis on a Word is laid, / As by a word the World itself was made."

=== Light ===
St Basil emphasises the role of light in making the universe beautiful, as does St Ambrose, who writes: "But the good Author uttered the word 'light' so that He might reveal the world by infusing brightness therein and thus make its aspect beautiful."

The light is described as being created here before the sun, moon, and stars, which appear on the fourth day (Genesis 1:14–19). In some Jewish interpretations, the light created here is a primordial light, different in nature from (and brighter than) that associated with the sun. The light has also been interpreted metaphorically, and has been connected to Psalm 104 (a "poem of creation"), where God is described as wrapping himself in light.

St Paul's reference to God's command that "the light ... shine out of darkness" in 2 Corinthians 4:6 has been linked with this verse in Genesis.

=== Cosmology ===
Some writers have seen a connection between this verse and the Big Bang in physical cosmology.

== Text ==
Various translations into English of the Hebrew text וַיֹּאמֶר אֱלֹהִים יְהִי אוֹר וַיְהִי אוֹר (Wayyōmer Ělōhîm "yǝhî ôr," wayǝhî ôr) include:

Translation	Text
American Standard Version	"And God said, Let there be light: and there was light."
Bible in Basic English	"And God said, Let there be light: and there was light."
Darby Bible	"And God said, Let there be light: and there was light."
Douay-Rheims Bible	"And God said: Be light made. And light was made."
God's Word Translation	"Then God said, "Let there be light!" So there was light."
Holman Christian Standard Bible	"Then God said, "Let there be light," and there was light."
Jewish Publication Society (3rd ed.)	"God said, 'Let there be light'; and there was light.
King James Version	"And God said, Let there be light: and there was light."
Knox Bible	"Then God said, Let there be light; and the light began."
New International Version	"And God said, "Let there be light," and there was light."
New King James Version	"Then God said, "Let there be light"; and there was light."
Webster's Revision	"And God said, Let there be light: and there was light."
World English Bible	"God said, 'Let there be light,' and there was light."
Young's Literal Translation	"and God saith, 'Let light be;' and light is."

Biblical paraphrases of the verse include "God spoke: "Light!" And light appeared", in Eugene Peterson's The Message, and "Then there was the voice of God. God: Let there be light. And light flashed into being" in The Voice published by Thomas Nelson, Inc. in 2012.

== See also ==
- Apollo 8 Genesis reading while in lunar orbit, December 24, 1968

Preceded by Genesis 1:2	Book of Genesis	Succeeded by Genesis 1:4
