= Genesis 1:2 =

Second verse of the first chapter of Genesis

- ← 1:1 1:3 →
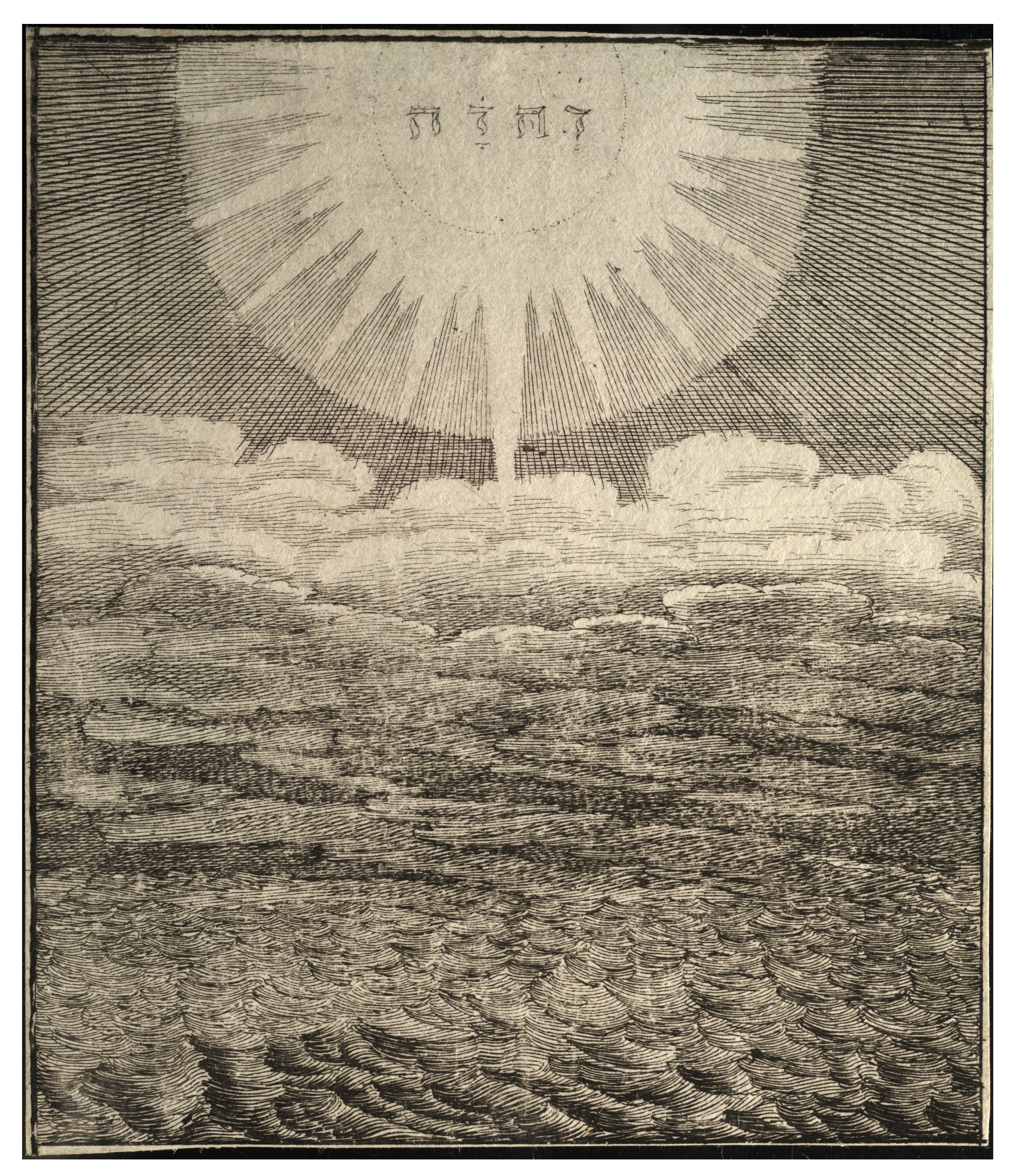
- Depiction of Genesis 1:2 by Wenceslaus Hollar: the Spirit of God (with Tetragrammaton) moves over the face of the deep.
- Book: Book of Genesis
- Hebrew Bible part: Torah
- Order in the Hebrew part: 1
- Christian Bible part: Old Testament
- Order in the Christian part: 1

Genesis 1:2 is the second verse of Book of Genesis and of the Genesis creation narrative. It is a part of the Torah portion Bereshit (Genesis 1:1–6:8).

== Text ==
=== Masoretic Text ===
וְהָאָרֶץ הָיְתָה תֹהוּ וָבֹהוּ וְחֹשֶׁךְ עַל פְּנֵי תְהוֹם וְרוּחַ אֱלֹהִים מְרַחֶפֶת עַל פְּנֵי הַמָּיִם

==== Transliteration of Masoretic Text ====
Veha’aretz hayeta tohu vaḇohu vechoshekh ‘al-pene tehom veruach Elohim merachephet ‘al-pene hammayim.

1. Ve: "and"
2. ha’aretz: "the earth"
3. hayeta: "was", pa'al construction past tense third person feminine singular
4. tohu vaḇohu: difficult to translate, but often rendered as "formless and void"
5. vechoshekh: "and darkness"
6. ‘al-pene: "[was] over [the] face", pənê being a plural construct state of the Hebrew word for face
7. tehom: a mythological or cosmological concept often translated as "the Deep"
8. veruach: "and [the] ruach", a difficult term translated as "spirit" or "wind"
9. Elohim: the generic Hebrew term for God or gods
10. merachephet: often translated as "hovered/was hovering". The word is ריחף (richeph) in pi'el participle form prefixed with one letter prefix "m-".
11. ‘al-pene hammayim: "over [the] face of the waters".

=== Septuagint Text ===
ἡ δὲ γῆ ἦν ἀόρατος καὶ ἀκατασκεύαστος, καὶ σκότος ἐπάνω τῆς ἀβύσσου, καὶ πνεῦμα Θεοῦ ἐπεφέρετο ἐπάνω τοῦ ὕδατος

==== Transliteration of Septuagint Text ====
i dé gí ín aóratos kaí akataskévastos, kaí skótos epáno tís avýssou, kaí pnevma Theoú epeféreto epáno toú ýdatos.

=== Vulgate Text ===
Terra autem erat inanis et vacua, et tenebrae super faciem abyssi, et spiritus Dei ferebatur super aquas.

==== Translation ====
The earth was without form, and void; and darkness was on the face of the deep. And the Spirit of God was hovering over the face of the waters.

== Analysis ==
Genesis 1:2 presents an initial condition of creation - namely, that it is tohu wa-bohu, formless and void. This serves to introduce the rest of the chapter, which describes a process of forming and filling. That is, on the first three days the heavens, the sky and the land is formed, and they are filled on days four to six by luminaries, birds and fish, and animals and man respectively.

Before God begins to create, the world is tohu wa-bohu (Hebrew: תֹהוּ וָבֹהוּ; Biblical Greek: ἀόρατος καὶ ἀκατασκεύαστος; Latin: inanis et vacua): the word tohu by itself means "emptiness, futility"; it is used to describe the desert wilderness. Bohu has no known meaning and was apparently coined to rhyme with and reinforce tohu. It appears again in Jeremiah 4:23, where Jeremiah warns Israel that rebellion against God will lead to the return of darkness and chaos, "as if the earth had been 'uncreated'." Tohu wa-bohu, chaos, is the condition that bara, ordering, remedies.

Darkness and "Deep" (Hebrew: תְהוֹם t^{e}hôm) are two of the three elements of the chaos represented in tohu wa-bohu (the third is the formless earth). In the Enûma Eliš, the Deep is personified as the goddess Tiamat, the enemy of Marduk; here it is the formless body of primeval water surrounding the habitable world, later to be released during the Deluge, when "all the fountains of the great deep burst forth" from the waters beneath the earth and from the "windows" of the sky. William Dumbrell argues that the reference to the "deep" in this verse "alludes to the detail of the ancient Near Eastern cosmologies" in which "a general threat to order comes from the unruly and chaotic sea, which is finally tamed by a warrior god". Dumbrell goes on to suggest that this verse "reflects something of the chaos/order struggle characteristic of ancient cosmologies". However, David Toshio Tsumura argues that the term t^{e}hôm is simply a common noun referring to underground water, and disputes any connection between the term and chaos.

The "Spirit of God" hovering over the waters in some translations comes from the Hebrew phrase ruach elohim, which has alternately been interpreted as a "great wind". Victor P. Hamilton decides, somewhat tentatively, for "spirit of God" but notes that this does not necessarily refer to the "Holy Spirit" of Christian theology. Rûach (רוּחַ) has the meanings "wind, spirit, breath," and elohim can mean "great" as well as "god". The ruach elohim which moves over the Deep may therefore mean the "wind/breath of God" (the storm-wind is God's breath in Psalms 18:15 and elsewhere, and the wind of God returns in the Flood story as the means by which God restores the earth), or God's "spirit", a concept which is somewhat vague in the Hebrew bible, or simply a great storm-wind.

== See also ==
- Book of Genesis
- Genesis 1:1
- Tohu wa-bohu
- Genesis 1:3
- Apollo 8 Genesis reading while in lunar orbit, December 24, 1968

Preceded by Genesis 1:1	Book of Genesis	Succeeded by Genesis 1:3
