= Quranic cosmology =

Nature of the cosmos according to the Qur'an

Quranic cosmology is how the Quran views the nature of the cosmos, especially its origins, development, and structure. In the Quran, the cosmos originates in an act of creation by God of the heavens and the earth over the course of six days, with the earth being created first, and the heavens second. The layout of the cosmos includes a solid firmament (called the heaven), below it being the Earth, compared to a spread-out bed. A cosmic ocean is found both above the heaven and below the earth. The number of heavens is seven, with possibly seven earths as well, arranged like a stack of plates. Above the highest heaven is the throne of God.

In the Quran, cosmology is related to themes of purpose, divine will, and an emphasis on the ordering of the world to allow human beings to live on it.

== Cosmography ==
=== Heaven and earth ===
The most important and frequently referred to constitutive features of the Quranic cosmos are the heavens and the earth:

The most substantial elements of the qurʾānic universe/cosmos are the (seven) heavens and the earth. The juxtaposition of the heavens (al-samāʾ; pl. al-samāwāt) and the earth (al-arḍ; not in the plural form in the Qurʾān) is seen in 222 qurʾānic verses. The heavens and the earth are the most vital elements on the scene—in terms of occurrence and emphasis—compared to which all other elements lose importance, and around which all others revolve. The same motif is used in the Bible as well.

References to heavens and earth constitute a literary device known as a merism, where two opposites or contrasting terms are used to refer to the totality of something. In Arabic texts generally and in the Quran, the merism of "the heavens and the earth" is used to refer to the totality of creation. A similar merism in the Quran to describe the entire terrestrial space is "the dry land and the sea," al-barr wa-l-baḥr (Q 6:59, 63, 97; 10:22; 17:70; 27:63; 29:65; 30:41; 31:31–32).

Contemporary and traditional interpretations have generally held in line with general biblical cosmology, with a flat Earth with skies stacked on top of each other, with some believing them to be domes and others flat circles.

=== Seven heavens ===
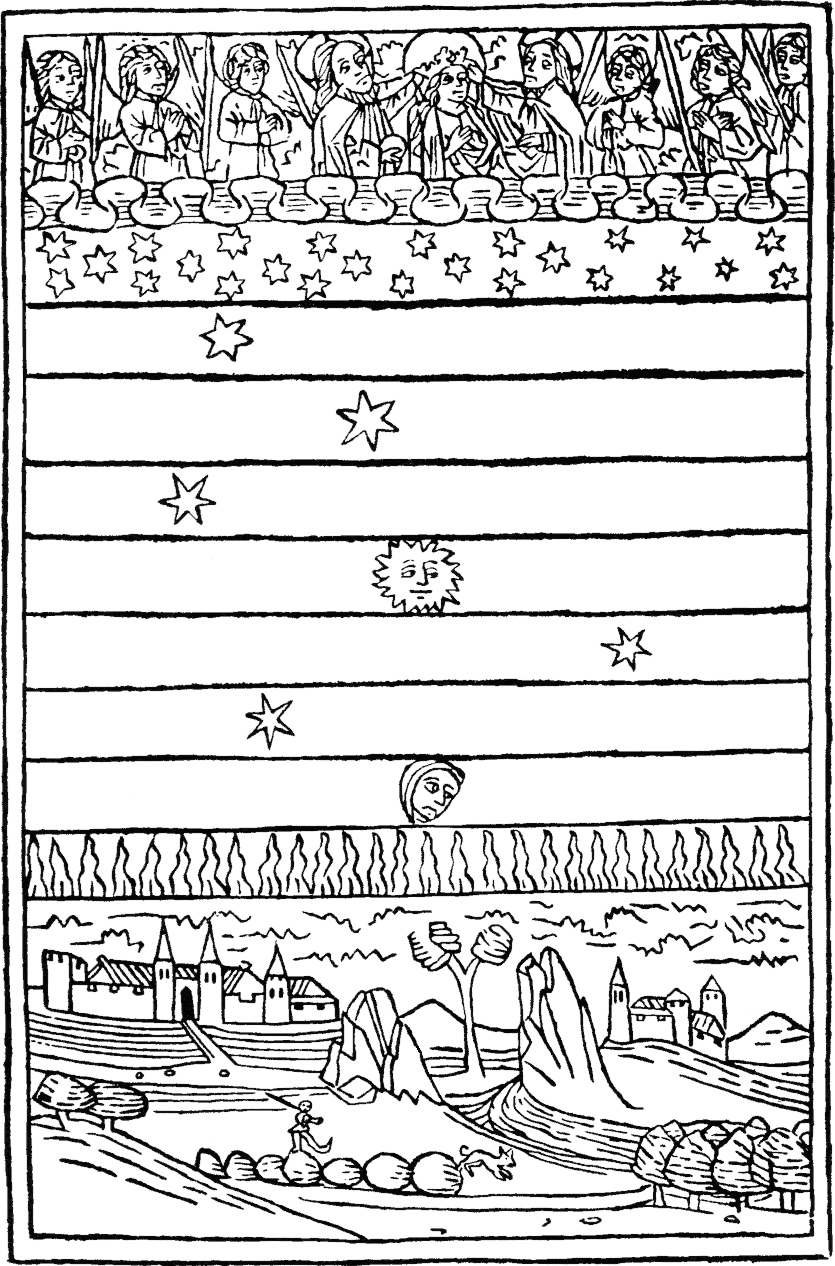
A wood carving from 1475, showing 7 celestial bodies. The 5 planets that can be seen with the naked eye, and the Sun and the Moon, each floating in a heavenly layer, the Arabic Felaq in ancient cosmology

In eight different verses, the Quran exclaims that there are seven heavens (Q 2:29, 17:44, 23:86, 41:12, 65:12, 67:3, 71:15, 78:12). These heavens as arranged ṭibāqan (Q 67:3, 71:15), or "superimposed" over each other, apparently in a flat way, with one heaven layered above another. The Quran closely shares in its use of imagery, motif, and personification, in describing the heavens, as is particularly found in the Book of Psalms and the Book of Isaiah: God orders the heavens to assemble and they assent (Q 41:11/Ps 50:1–6/Is 48:13–14), the heavens are a witness to the glory of God (Q 17:44/Ps 148), and the injunction to cast one's sight upon the heavens as a testimony of God's creation (Q 67:3–4/Is 40:25–26).

Multi-layered heavens had been in vogue in Middle Eastern cosmologies since the 3rd millennium BC. Absent from the Hebrew Bible, they first entered Jewish cosmology in the 3rd century BC and Christian cosmology in a later period. Rabbinic authors most commonly asserted the existence of seven (as opposed to a different number of) heavens, whereas East Syrian Christian authors rejected this figure.

=== Seven earths ===
One passage in the Quran has produced some controversy as to whether, mirroring the heavens, there are also seven earths: "It (is) God who created seven heavens, and of the earth a similar (number) to them" [allāhu lladhī khalaqa sabʿa samāwātin wa-mina l-’arḍi mithla-hunna] (Q 65:12). The competing interpretations are either that God created seven earths to counterbalance the number (seven) of heavens, or, that God's creation of the earth was performed to counterbalance the creation of the heavens (irrespective of their number). The expression of seven earths is much less common than that of seven heavens in the ancient world, with only seemingly implicit references to it in much earlier Sumerian texts. However, the Talmud describes a presence of seven underworlds (to mirror the seven heavens), and other texts either describe multiple names for earth (without implying multiple earths) or that Gehenna is compartmentalized into seven areas. Towards the end of late antiquity, rabbinic (but not other) texts begin to outwardly describe there being seven earths, including Pesikta de-Rav Kahana, Leviticus Rabbah 29:11, Sefer Rabbah di-Bereshit, and others.

=== Shape of the earth ===
The Quran has been interpreted as depicting a flat earth, as the text frequently emphasizes the extensiveness or flatness of the earth and how it has been spread out. The earth is also frequently described as a site for human flourishing, and compared to comfortable pieces of flat furniture such as a carpet, bed, or couch. Scott Noegel and Brennan Wheeler write that the Quran shares the Biblical and Near Eastern cosmological conceptions of the world, including a male creator who fights Chaos (represented as water), divisions into upper and lower worldly realms, and a flat, spread out earth. Medieval Muslim theologians did not fully agree about the shape of the Earth; some maintained the traditionalist flat-earth cosmography and others acceptes the spherical earth of Ptolemaic astronomy and rejected a literal reading of the relevant Quranic passages.

=== Firmament ===
The Quranic heaven(s), reflecting their near eastern and biblical cosmological contexts, are firmaments, referring to a solid structure (or barrier) in the sky whose function it is to separate the earth from the heavenly ocean above (visible as the blue sky), and more broadly, given its expanse, to separate the upper from the lower waters (which may correspond to the two sweet and salty seas, the baḥrān, referred to throughout the Quran like in Q 25:53, 27:61, 35:12, 55:19). There is some controversy over the shape of the Quranic firmament, namely, whether it is domed or flat, although most have understood the firmaments to be flat.

The heavens are analogized to a roof, structure, and edifice without crack or fissure. It is extremely broad and stretched, but it is also constantly broadening. Mohammad Ali Tabatabaʾi and Saida Mirsadri have summarized the Quranic discussion of the firmament as follows:

As for the nature of the heaven/sky in the Qurʾān, it is a concrete object (Kor 79, 27; 91, 5) built by God (Kor 50, 6) by hands (= power?) (Kor 51, 47) and it is lifted up (Kor 88, 18). So it is not surprising to expect its fall, or at least the fall of some of its fragments (Kor 34, 9; 17, 92), upon the earth; yet, God himself holds the firmament lest it may fall upon the earth (Kor 22, 65). In some other verses they are assumed to be held up by invisible pillars (Kor 13, 2; 31, 10). The Qurʾān describes the heavens as a protected/preserved and uplifted roof (saqfan maḥfūẓan: Kor 21, 32; al-saqf al-marfūʿ: Kor 52, 5) and a structure/edifice (bināʾ: Kor 2, 22; 40, 64), in which there is no fissures (Kor 50, 6; 67, 3). As for the measure of the firmament, it seems that it (alongside with the earth) is the most extended thing which the Qurʾān knows of. So massive, seems to the Qurʾān, the scale of the sky, that describing the grandeur of paradise, it likens it, in its broadness, to the sky (Kor 3, 133; 57, 21). As large as it already is, its width is still constantly broadening (Kor 51, 47).

==== Pillars upholding the firmament ====
Another controversy has concerned the Quranic view on the relationship between the firmament and the pillars holding it up. A few notable passages (e.g. 31:10) have been interpreted as either stating that the firmament is held up by invisible pillars, or that the firmament is not held up by visible pillars at all, meaning, it is unsupported by any physical artifice (and is instead held up by God's power). Decharneux has recently argued that the latter interpretation is correct, and has related it to a similar cluster of ideas in the homilies of Jacob of Serugh, a Syriac poet of the 6th century, particularly in his Hexaemeron. Another commonality between the two in their respective discussions of the firmament is in describing it as being decorated by stars. Likewise, a commonality shared between the Quran and the Hexaemeron of the fourth-century bishop Basil of Caesarea is in describing the firmament as having been created out of smoke in the creation week.

==== Demons and shooting stars ====
Several passages in the Quran describe demons or jinn as ascending to the firmament, nearing the well-protected and fortified heavens, in order to eavesdrop and listen in on heavenly secrets. Upon getting near, however, they are cast away by shooting stars launched at them as projectiles.

Indeed we have made in the heavens constellations/towers; and we adorned them for the watchers. And we protected them from every accursed demon, except those who eavesdrop after whom follows a strong fame. (Q 15:16–18, cf. Q 37:6–10; 55:33; 67:5; 72:1–9)

Patricia Crone notes that, like jinn, the demons of the Testament of Solomon ascend to the firmament and eavesdrop on heavenly secrets; as did demons of Zoroastrian cosmology, who in addition encounter a heavenly defense systems (as did Islamic jinn). Similar statements are also found in the Talmud (Berakhot 18b) and the 8th-century Scolion of Theodore bar Konai.

=== Hell ===
The topography of hell has been summarized by Walid Saleh:

Hell in the Qur’an is [...] a topography that has trees (Q. 56:51–56 and Q. 17:60),108 and levels (Q. 4:145); it also has long chains (Q. 69:32 describes a seventy cubits length chain), and those who dwell within it have food and water (Q. 88:5–7 and Q. 69:36). It also has seven gates (Q. 15:44, Q. 16:29, Q. 39:72, and Q. 40:76), and hot springs (Q. 88:5), and the food is a horrible plant that even camels refuse to eat (Q. 85:6). Finally, it has pillars extended (Q. 104:9), a detail that implies spaciousness. Hell in the Qur’an was also made of layers that encompass levels of severity of torment, as Q. 4:145 makes clear. In Hell, the damned seem to be able to see and hear the glorious lives of those who dwell Paradise, and they are able to talk to each other (Q. 7:50).

== Cosmogony ==
=== Creation in six days ===
The Quran states that the universe was created in six days using a consistent, quasi-creedal formula (Q 7:54, 10:3, 11:7, 25:59, 32:4, 50:38, 57:4). Quran 41:9–12 represents one of the most developed creation accounts in the Quran:

Say: "Do you indeed disbelieve in the One who created the earth in two days [bi-lladhī khalaqa l-'arḍa fī yawmayni], and do you set up rivals to Him? That is the Lord of the worlds. He placed on it firm mountains (towering) above it, and blessed it, and decreed for it its (various) foods in four days, equal to the ones who ask. Then, He mounted (upward) to the sky [thumma stawā 'ilā l-samā'i], while it was (still) smoke [wa-hiya dukhānun], and said to it and to the earth, 'Come, both of you, willingly or unwillingly!' They both said, 'We come willingly'." He finished them (as) seven heavens in two days [qaḍā-hunna sabʿa samāwātin fī yawmayni], and inspired each heaven (with) its affair.

This passage contains a number of peculiarities compared with the Genesis creation account, including the formation of the earth before heaven and the idea that heaven existed in a formless state of smoke before being formed by God into its current form.

=== Order of creation events ===
The sequence of creation events is laid out in Q 41:9–12. This passage allocates two days for the creation of the earth, four days for the event in which the "Lord placed the mountains above it [the earth]" and "decreed for it its foods", and then another two days for the creation of the heavens. Literally, this passage suggests an eight day creation, in tension with both biblical models of creation and the six-day formula that appears in other places in the Quran. Furthermore, the earth is created before the heavens are (unlike in the Genesis creation narrative), potentially recalling the debate within Christianity and Judaism about if earth was created first, heaven was created first, or the two were formed simultaneously. The exact Quranic sequence of creation, however, is not known to occur in another text.

=== Separation of heaven and earth ===
The separation of heaven and earth is described in the Surah 21, verse 30:

Do those who disbelieve not see that the heavens and the earth were (once) a solid mass [ratq], and We split the two of them apart [fa-fataqnā-humā], and We made every living thing from water?

In the Quran, ratq is a hapax legomenon, a word that only appears one time. In Arabic dictionaries, it means something that is patched up or sewn together, meaning that heaven and earth were once connected to one another. The separation is described using the verb fataqa, meaning "splitting, cleaving, unstitching, unsewing".

== See also ==
- Ancient Near Eastern cosmology
- Biblical cosmology
- Creatio ex materia
- Creation of life from clay
- Early Greek cosmology
- Hexaemeron (Basil of Caesarea)
- Jewish cosmology
- Mandaean cosmology
- Pre-Islamic Arabian inscriptions
- Separation of heaven and earth
- Seven earths
