= Creation of life from clay =

Miraculous birth theme in multiple mythologies

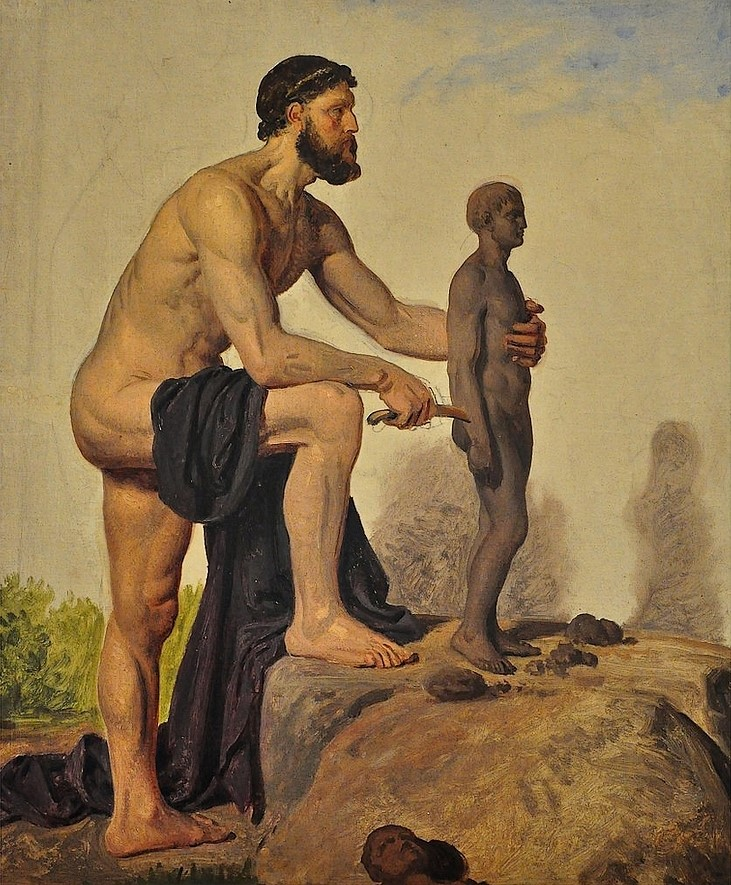
Prometheus Creating Man in Clay by Constantin Hansen

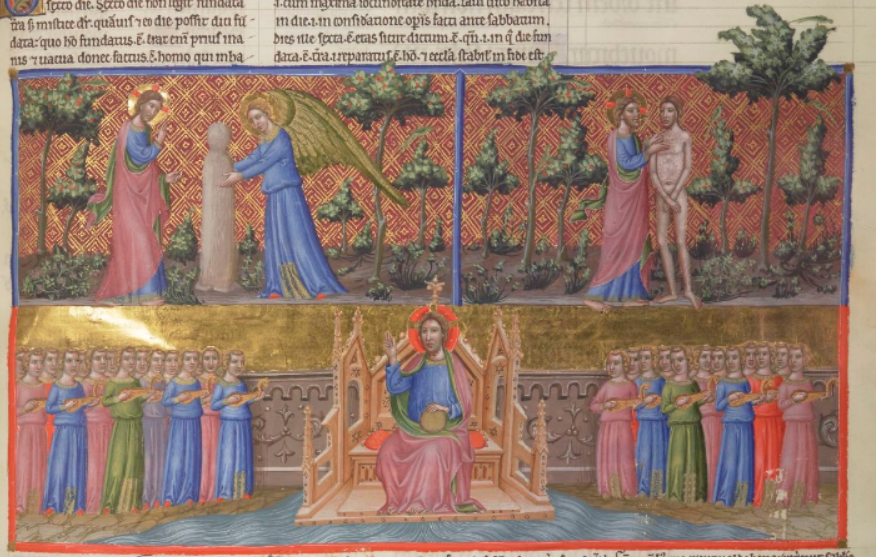
Creation of Adam from a block of clay in the Great Canterbury Psalter

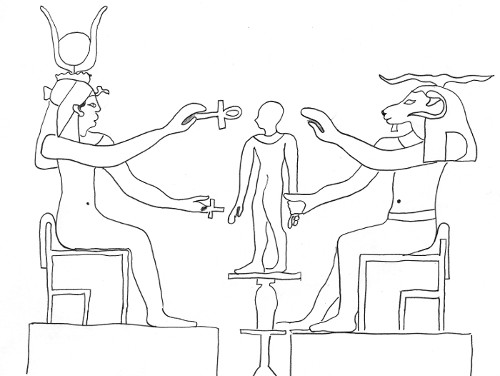
Khnum (right) is a creator god who forms humans and gods out of clay. Here Isis (left) gives life.

The creation of life from clay (or soil, earth, dust, or mud) appears throughout world religions and mythologies, some of the earliest occurring in the creation myths about the origin of man in the cosmology of the ancient Near East. The idea occurs in both biblical cosmology and Quranic cosmology. The clay represents an unformed, chaotic material which is shaped and given form by the gods in a creative process. A related motif is the use of clay to seed or create the world. In southwest Asia, the clay-shaping was cast as a magical act. In the same way that humans would use clay to make terracotta images of their gods, so the gods moulded humans out of clay in their godlike form. They were described as obtaining this material by pinching off pieces of wet mud.

An example of this appears in the biblical Book of Genesis (2:7), where Adam is made out of dust, an idea that recurs throughout the Bible (Job 10:9; Psalm 90:3; 104:29; Isaiah 29:16, etc.). Other examples are found in the Epic of Gilgamesh, where the goddess Aruru creates Enkidu from clay, in Egyptian mythology, where Khnum makes man out of clay, and in various Greek texts crediting Prometheus (one of the Titans) with doing the same. Later, the concept would influence art history, including the works of Giorgio Vasari.

== List of examples by religion ==
=== Judaism ===
- The Book of Genesis 2:7 states that man was made out of dust. The name Adam derives from the Hebrew word adāmāh, which literally means "red clay".
- In Jewish folklore, a golem (Hebrew: גולם) is an animated anthropomorphic being that is created entirely from inanimate matter, usually clay or mud.

=== Christianity ===
- Many of the Church Fathers, including John Chrysostom and Basil of Caesarea, wrote about the creation of Adam from clay. John, Basil, and others interpreted this as God creating man from a low material, which should lead to humility on the part of man.
- The creation of Adam from clay was a popular idea in Syriac Christianity, appearing in the hymns of Ephrem the Syrian and Narsai, and in the Cave of Treasures.

=== Islam ===
- In the cosmology of the Quran, man is said to have been created from clay (Quran 23:12), referred to by the Arabic ṭīn. Adam is also said to have been made from dust (turāb). Like other traditions, the concept has negative connotations in the Quran, and the use of this matter to make Adam is cited as justification by Iblis (Satan) to reject God's command to prostrate to him.

== List of examples by region and culture ==
=== Ancient Near Eastern ===
- The Epic of Gilgamesh states that the goddess Aruru created humans and animals out of clay. The epic goes on to narrate how Aruru also creates Enkidu out of a pinch of clay.
- The Sumerian myth of the Ninhursag states that humans were fashioned from clay to serve the gods (see Enki and the Making of Man) as part of a competition. In the Akkadian version, the Epic of Atrahasis, Enki advises that a god is killed and that Nintur (the birth goddess) mix his flesh and blood with clay to create humans. A similar idea is seen in the Enuma Elish, where Enki creates man out of the blood of a slain revel god.
- The Babylonian Epic of Atrahasis states that humans were created by Nintu (Ninhursag) from mixing clay with the blood of a sacrificed god. In context, the elder gods forced the younger gods to do all the hard labor so the younger gods devised a plan to create humans to do their bidding instead. The sacrificed god Ilawela (also written as Geshtu-(E), Geshtu, Gestu, or We-ila) is a minor god of intelligence (the text states this quite clearly: "Ilawela ...had intelligence").
- Contrary to common misconception, the Babylonian creation epic Enuma Elish says that humans were created from a combination of blood and bone, and not clay. Marduk instructed Enki (Ea) to do this, which he did using the blood of Tiamat's fallen consort, Kingu.

=== Egyptian ===
- In Ancient Egypt, it was the Egyptian god Khnum that was most commonly associated with the creation of humans. Khnum is said to create human children from clay before placing them into their mother's womb. Khnum was the crafter of all living things, including some gods, on the potter's wheel: "You are the master of the wheel, who is pleased to model on the wheel . . . you have made humans on the wheel, you have created the gods; you have modelled the small and large cattle; you have formed everything on your wheel each day, in your name Khnum the potter".

=== Greek ===
- In Greek mythology, according to Pseudo-Apollodorus, Prometheus molded men out of water and earth. Near the town of Panopeus, the remaining used clay was allegedly still present in historical times as two cart-sized rocks that smelled like a human body. Myths about Prometheus were inspired by Near Eastern Myths about Enki.
- Also in Greek mythology, Prometheus moulds a clay statue of Athena, the goddess of wisdom to whom he is devoted, and gives it life from a stolen sunbeam.
- Pandora, from Greek mythology, was fashioned from clay and given the quality of "naïve grace combined with feeling".

=== East Asian ===
- According to Chinese mythology, (see Chu Ci and Imperial Readings of the Taiping Era), Nüwa molded figures from the yellow earth, giving them life and the ability to bear children.
- The Ainu historically believed that Kamui built the Ainu on the back of a giant fish using clay, sticks, and water.
- Although there is not a single creation myth that is common among the Korean people, in a shamanic hymn for a shamanic ritual called "Seng-gut(셍굿)" that originated from Hamgyong Province, there is a section that men and women were created from loess(which is called Hwangto in korea), though the hymn does not specify who the creator is.

=== South Asian ===
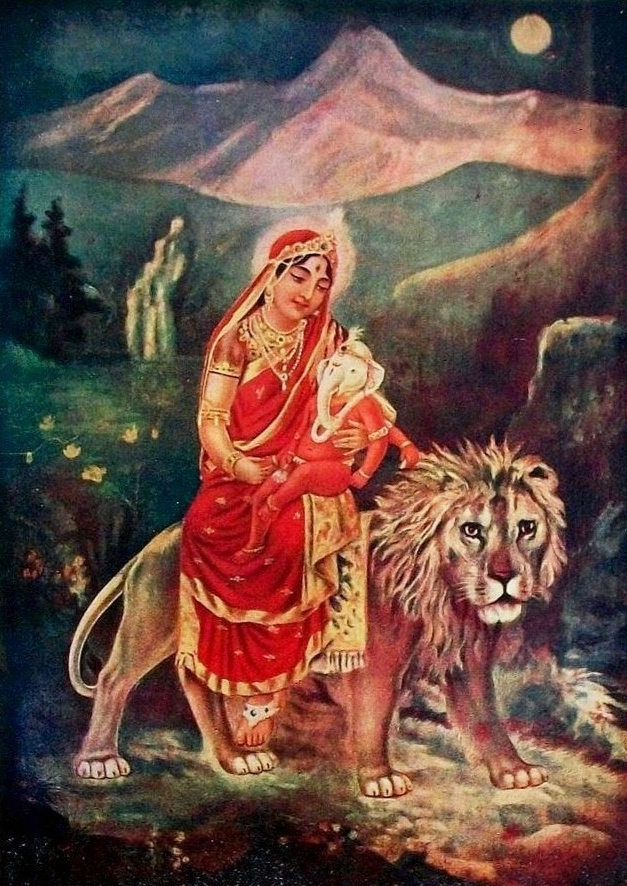
Ganesha seated on the lap of his mother Parvati. Parvati is said to have created Ganesha from clay.

- The Birhor of India believe that a leech was responsible for bringing the creator god mud which would later be made into humans.
- The Gondi people believe that Nantu (the moon) was made of mud that Kumpara spat onto his son.
- The Garo people in India believe that a beetle gave clay to the creator god Tatara-Rabuga, who made humanity from it.
- Andamanese Mythology women were fashioned from clay (while the men emerged from split bamboo).

=== Central Asian ===
- Central Asian mythology, including Altaic and Mongolian, have stories about how the god Ulgen created the first man, Erlik, from clay floating on the surface of water.
- Buryatian mythology has the god Sombov create humans from clay and wool.

=== African ===
- The Yoruba culture holds that the god Obatala, likewise, created the human race from clay.
- The Efé people have a creation story in which the first man was made of clay and skin.
- According to Malagasy mythology, the sky deity Zanahary and the earth deity Ratovantany created the Malagasy people by breathing life into clay dolls.
- The Songye people have a creation myth involving two gods, Mwile and Kolombo, creating humans out of clay as part of a rivalry.
- Some of the Dinka of Sudan believe Nhialac, the creator, formed the humans Abuk and Garang from clay. The clay was put into pots to grow, and eventually came out as fully-grown adults. Other narratives attribute the creation of humanity to Nhialac blowing his nose or believe that humans came from the sky and were placed upon a river as full-grown adults.
- The Dogon people believe the Earth goddess was made when Amma flung earth into the primordial void.
- In a Madagascar myth, two gods create human beings: the earth god forms them from wood and clay, the god of heaven gives them life. Human beings die so that they may return to the origins of their being.

=== Polynesian ===
- In Hawaiian tradition, the first man was composed of muddy water and his female counterpart was taken from his side parts (story may be partially or entirely Christianized).
- Tane, in Polynesian mythology, created the original woman from red clay.

=== Norse ===
- In Skaldskaparmal, the god Thor encounters a giant named Mokkurkalfe, who was made from clay.

=== Americas ===
- According to the beliefs of some Indigenous Americans, the Earth-maker formed the figure of many men and women, which he dried in the sun and into which he breathed life.
- Iñupiat mythology has Raven create a human out of clay, who would later become Tornaq, the first demon.
- According to Inca mythology, the creator god, Viracocha, formed humans from clay on his second attempt at creating living creatures.
- The Aymaran creation myth involves the making of humans from clay.

== In fiction ==
- The superhero Wonder Woman was sculpted from clay by her mother Hippolyta and given life by the Greek gods.

== In science ==
- The role of clay minerals in the process of abiogenesis was examined in a 2013 paper titled Clay Minerals and the Origin of Life.

== See also ==
- Jewish cosmology
- Separation of heaven and earth
