= Heaven in Judaism =

Dwelling place of God and other heavenly beings

In Jewish cosmology, Shamayim (Hebrew: שָׁמַיִם šāmayīm, "heavens") is the dwelling place of God and other heavenly beings according to the Hebrew Bible. It is one of three components of the biblical cosmology. In Judaism specifically, there are two other realms, being Eretz (Earth), home of the living, and Sheol, the realm of the dead—including, according to post-Hebrew Bible literature, the abode of the righteous dead.

== Etymology ==
The Hebrew word שָׁמַיִם šāmayīm, "heavens", is pluralized from Proto-Semitic *šamāy-. This renders שָׁמַיִם šāmayīm a plurale tantum, simultaneously singular and plural. Therefore, "heaven" and "heavens" may both be legitimate translations as determined by context. J. Edward Wright proposes that shamayim may share relatedness with the Akkadian shamu (sky), shamu(m) (rain) and sha-me (place of water).

== Description ==
Exodus 24, Ezekiel 1, Isaiah 6, 2 Chronicles 18 and 1 Kings 22 describe God seated on a throne, with angels surrounding him. Exodus 24:10 describes a pavement made of sapphire or lapis lazuli. Ezekiel 1 describes a throne room made of angels and God's throne being seated on a flying angel. Isaiah 6 describes an altar standing before God's throne. 2 Chronicles 18 and 1 Kings 22 describe angels to the right and the left of God, like prosecutors and defendants to the right and left of a judge in a bet din. Judaism interprets the visions symbolically, rather than as literal descriptions of heaven.

The Biblical author pictured the earth as a globe of earth and water, with the heavens above and the underworld below. The raqiya (firmament), a solid inverted bowl above the earth, coloured blue by the cosmic ocean, kept the waters above the earth from flooding the world. From about 300 BCE a newer Greek model largely replaced the idea of a three-tiered cosmos; the newer view saw the earth as a sphere at the centre of a set of seven concentric heavens, one for each visible planet plus the sun and moon, with the realm of God in an eighth and highest heaven, but although several Jewish works from this period have multiple heavens, as do some New Testament works, none has exactly the formal Greek system.

=== Seven heavens ===
In the course of the 1st millennium CE, Jewish scholars developed an elaborate system of seven heavens, named:

1. Vilon (Hebrew: וִילוֹן, Tiberian: Wīlōn, Curtain) or Araphel (Hebrew: עֲרָפֶל, Tiberian: ʿĂrāp̄el, Thick Cloud): The first heaven, governed by Archangel Gabriel, is the closest of heavenly realms to the Earth; it is also considered the abode of Adam and Eve.
2. Raqia (Hebrew: רָקִיעַ, Tiberian: Rāqīaʿ, Expanse): The second heaven is controlled by the Archangel Raphael, with the Archangel Zachariel also being said to govern it alongside him. It was in this heaven that Moses, during his visit to Paradise, encountered the angel Nuriel who stood "300 parasangs high, with a retinue of 50 myriads of angels all fashioned out of water and fire". Also, Raqia is considered the realm where the fallen angels are imprisoned and the planets fastened.
3. Shehaqim (Hebrew: שְׁחָקִים, Tiberian: Shā̆ḥāqīm, Skies/Clouds): The third heaven, under the leadership of the Archangel Hanniel, it serves as the home of the Garden of Eden and the Tree of Life; it is also the realm where manna, the holy food of angels, is produced. The Second Book of Enoch, meanwhile, states that both Paradise and hell are accommodated in Shehaqim with hell being located simply "on the northern side".
4. Maon (Hebrew: מָעוֹן, Tiberian: Māʿōn, Dwelling/Habitation): The fourth heaven is ruled by the Archangel Michael, and according to the Talmud, Hagigah 12, it contains the heavenly Jerusalem, the Temple, and the Altar.
5. Makhon (Hebrew: מָכוֹן, Tiberian: Māḵōn, Fixed Place): The fifth heaven is said to be under the administration of Samael, although others would say the Archangel Hammuel. It is also said to be where the Ishim and the Song-Uttering Choirs reside.
6. Zebul (Hebrew: זְבוּל, Tiberian: Zăḇūl, Lofty Abode): The sixth heaven falls under the jurisdiction of the Archangel Zadkiel.
7. Araboth (Hebrew: עֲרָבוֹת, Tiberian: ʿĂrāḇōṯ, Deserts/Plains): The seventh heaven, under the leadership of the Archangel Cassiel, is the holiest of the seven heavens because it houses the Throne of God attended by the Seven Archangels and serves as the realm in which God dwells; underneath the throne itself lies the abode of all unborn human souls. It is also considered the home of the Seraphim, the Cherubim, and the Hayyoth.

Medieval Jewish Merkavah and Heikhaloth literature focused on discussing the details of these heavens, sometimes in connection with traditions relating to Enoch, such as the Third Book of Enoch.

== Legends ==
In the 19th century book Legends of the Jews, rabbi Louis Ginzberg compiled Jewish legends found in rabbinic literature. Among the legends are ones about the world to come and the two Gardens of Eden. The world to come is called Paradise, and it is said to have a double gate made of carbuncle that is guarded by 600,000 shining angels.

Seven clouds of glory overshadow Paradise, and under them, in the center of Paradise, stands the tree of life. The tree of life overshadows Paradise too, and it has fifteen thousand different tastes and aromas that winds blow all across Paradise. Under the tree of life are many pairs of canopies, one of stars and the other of sun and moon, while a cloud of glory separates the two. In each pair of canopies sits a rabbinic scholar who explains the Torah to one.

When one enters Paradise, then one is proffered by the archangel Michael to God on the altar of the temple of the heavenly Jerusalem, whereupon one is transfigured into an angel (the ugliest person becomes as beautiful and shining as "the grains of a silver pomegranate upon which fall the rays of the sun"). The angels that guard Paradise's gate adorn one in seven clouds of glory, crown one with gems and pearls and gold, place eight myrtles in one's hand, and praise one for being righteous while leading one to a garden of eight hundred roses and myrtles that is watered by many rivers.

In the garden is one's canopy, its beauty according to one's merit, but each canopy has four rivers – milk, honey, wine, and balsam – flowing out from it, and has a golden vine and thirty shining pearls hanging from it. Under each canopy is a table of gems and pearls attended to by sixty angels.

The light of Paradise is the light of the righteous people therein. Each day in Paradise, one wakes up a child and goes to bed an elder to enjoy the pleasures of childhood, youth, adulthood, and old age. In each corner of Paradise is a forest of 800,000 trees, the least among the trees greater than the best herbs and spices, attended to by 800,000 sweetly singing angels.

Paradise is divided into seven paradises, each one 120,000 miles long and wide. Depending on one's merit, one joins one of the paradises:

1. The first is made of glass and cedar and is for converts to Judaism
2. The second is of silver and cedar and is for penitents
3. The third is of silver and gold, gems and pearls, and is for the patriarchs, Moses and Aaron, the Israelites that left Egypt and lived in the wilderness, and the kings of Israel
4. The fourth is of rubies and olive wood and is for the holy and steadfast in faith
5. The fifth is like the third, except a river flows through it and its bed was woven by Eve and angels, and it is for the Messiah and Elijah
6. The sixth division is not described, except that it is for those who died doing a pious act
7. The seventh division is also not described, except that it is for those who died from an illness in expiation for Israel's sins

Beyond Paradise, according to Legends of the Jews, is the higher Gan Eden, where God is enthroned and explains the Torah to its inhabitants. The higher Gan Eden contains three hundred and ten worlds and is divided into seven compartments. The compartments are not described, though it is implied that each compartment is greater than the previous one and is joined based on one's merit.

1. The first compartment is for Jewish martyrs
2. The second for those who drowned
3. The third for "Rabbi Johanan ben Zakkai and his disciples"
4. The fourth for those whom the cloud of glory carried off
5. The fifth for penitents
6. The sixth for youths who have never sinned
7. The seventh for the poor who lived decently and studied the Torah

== See also ==
- Celestial spheres
- Garden of Eden
- Gehenna
- Paradisus Judaeorum
- Resurrection of the dead
- Religious cosmology

== Bibliography ==
- Aune, David E. (2003). "Cosmology". Westminster Dictionary of the New Testament and Early Christian Literature. Westminster John Knox Press. ISBN 9780664219178.
- Fretheim, Terence E. (2003). "Heaven(s)". In Gowan, Donald E (ed.). The Westminster theological wordbook of the Bible. Westminster University Press. ISBN 9780664223946.
- Pennington, Jonathan T. (2007). Heaven and earth in the Gospel of Matthew. Brill. ISBN 978-9004162051.
