= Seder Rabbah di-Bereshit =

Jewish cosmological text from late antiquity

Seder Rabbah di-Bereshit (Hebrew: סדר רבה דבראשית, "The Greater Order of Creation"), also transmitted under the title Maʿaseh Bereshit ("The Work of Creation"), is a work of late antique literature. It represents the most extensive surviving treatment of Jewish cosmology in late antiquity, dating to the post-Talmudic or early geonic period. It is also closely associated with Hekhalot and Merkavah literature.

Seder Rabbah di-Bereshit occupies a unique position in Jewish intellectual history as the first known Jewish text to articulate a fully symmetrical cosmology in which heaven and earth (specifically, the seven heavens and the seven earths), mirror one another structurally and theologically. Its synthesis of apocalyptic, rabbinic, and mystical traditions makes it a key source for the study of early Jewish cosmology and the development of medieval Jewish mysticism.

== Manuscript tradition and titles ==
The work survives in a highly fluid manuscript tradition, with substantial variation in structure, content, and even title. Although modern scholarship commonly refers to it as Seder Rabbah di-Bereshit, this title is attested in only a single manuscript; the majority of manuscripts instead transmit the text under the name Maʿaseh Bereshit, echoing the mishnaic category of restricted cosmological speculation in Mishnah Ḥagigah. 2:1. The alternative and dominant name in the manuscript, the Ma'aseh Bereshit, is inspired by the esoteric doctrine that the text circulated as the revelation of the maʿaseh bereshit of the Mishnah, previously restricted from public teaching.

No critical edition of the text has been produced, and the text is preserved in divergent versions across manuscripts from Oxford, Munich, Vatican, and elsewhere.

== Literary context ==
Seder Rabbah di-Bereshit belongs to a broader late antique Jewish discourse on the "Work of Creation" (maʿaseh bereshit) and stands in deliberate contrast to classical rabbinic midrash. Whereas earlier rabbinic treatments of Genesis 1 are predominantly exegetical, such as Genesis Rabbah, Seder Rabbah di-Bereshit is largely non-exegetical, presenting cosmological structures and descriptions with minimal reliance on scriptural exegesis or interpretation. For this reason, medieval scribes frequently transmitted it alongside Hekhalot texts concerned with the complementary discipline of the "Work of the Chariot" (maʿaseh merkavah).

== Cosmological structure ==
The central feature of Seder Rabbah di-Bereshit is a highly developed cosmological system consisting of seven heavens and seven earths, arranged in a symmetrical, concentric structure. Each heaven corresponds to a specific earth, forming a mirrored cosmic architecture in which the upper and lower realms reflect one another. This model departs sharply from earlier Jewish cosmologies, which tended to multiply heavens but rarely extended such speculation to the earth or netherworld. These are possibly visibly represented as a series of 7 concentric circles (or spheres) divided by a horizontal axis (this axis is sometimes given the name "Welon"). The highest heaven, Aravot, is sometimes said to be "hung on the right arm of God". Above it are sometimes seven additional heavens. The text also states that there are 18,000 worlds that border this set of spheres, seemingly as additional layers around the Eretz Ha-taḥtonah (or possibly as adjacent worlds as they are divided into 4 quadrants, with their being worlds east, west, north and south of the Eretz ha-taḥtonah). The last set of described worlds that sir like shells around the Eretz ha-taḥtonah are thick mud, abyss, tohu and bohu, and an unfathomable, innumerable, immeasurable and infinite darkness. There are implied to be worlds beyond this, but the text views them as forbidden topics and warns the reader not to speculate further.

In the text the heavens are called ma'yanot (fountains) and the earths are called tehomot (depths, particularly of primordial water).

The earths and their corresponding heavens are:

Level	Heaven	Heaven's contents	Earth	Earth's Contents
1	Shamayim	Nothing listed	Ḥeled	Humans, Torah
2	Raqia'	Sun, moon, stars, and constellations	Tevel	Mountains, hills, fantastic creatures (those which are half human and half animal, or who have unusual numbers of body parts)
3	Sheḥaqim	Manna for the righteous, the heavenly Jerusalem, the Heavenly Temple	Arqa	The seven sections of Gehinnom (the exact list of departments varies a little in different manuscripts)
4	Zevul (sometimes listed as Makhon)	Michael, the heavenly high priest, and the offerings of sacrifice he makes	Yabashah	Sea and rivers, dry land
5	Ma'on (sometimes stated to be Zevul instead)	Ministering angels who sing during the day	Ḥaravah	Channels and lakes
6	Makhon	snow, hail, lightening, thunder, etc, as well as rivers of fire, storm, and vapor	Adamah	Greatness and strength of Qadosh Barukh Hu, power and beauty of Yotzer Bareshit
7	Eretz (sometimes listed as Eretz ha-taḥtonah "the lowest earth")	Justice, life, blessing, Ofannim, Keruvim, Hayyot, other angels, Throne of glory, and God	'Aravot	Hayyot, Ofannim, Throne of glory, feet of the Shekinah

The contents of the 6th heaven and earth may have been paired, as that earth evokes the idea of God as a creator and the corresponding heaven contains natural phenomena. The third heaven and earth are connected, as Sheol (one of the departments of Gehinnom) is where those who destroyed the Jerusalem Temple are initially punished before being chased through the other departments. They are never to be released. Apostate Jews are also listed as bound for eternal punishment. Jewish descriptions of Hell/Gehinnom often see punishment is seen as temporary, lasting 12 months, but may include specific classes of sinners that face eternal punishment. Ordinary sinners are not put through the seven departments in this text. The corresponding heaven makes manna as a reward for the righteous, and the heavenly counterpart of the destroyed Jerusalem Temple.

At the highest heaven (ʿAravot) and the lowest earth (Ḥeled), the distinction between heaven and earth collapses entirely. Both realms contain the Throne of Glory, the angelic hosts (including the Ḥayyot and Ofannim), and manifestations of the divine presence. The text explicitly states that just as the Shekhinah (the dwelling of the divine presence of God) is present above, so too it is present below, articulating a radical vision of divine immanence throughout the cosmos. These two realms (though only these two) are perfect pairs.

"And in the lowermost earth are the Hayôt Ha-Qodeš and the Throne of glory. The latter is the footstool of the Lord (Adôn) of the whole earth, as it is said: ‘The heaven is my throne, and the earth is my footstool’; and further it is said: ‘Now as I beheld the living creatures (Hayot), behold one wheel (Ofan) upon the earth...’ (Ezekiel, 1:15). And as His Shekinah is found on high, so she is likewise found below, as it is said: and the name of the city from that day shall be, YHWH is there."

Another statement in the text is that God's throne is in the seventh heaven, but "his glory he gave downwards".

== Gehinnom and the netherworld ==
A particularly elaborate section of the work is devoted to the description of Gehinnom, which is located within the third earth (Arqa). Gehinnom is subdivided into seven compartments, each associated with biblical names such as Sheʾol, Avaddon, and Beʾer Shaḥat. These compartments are reserved for the eternal punishment of the gravest sinners, especially apostates and the foreign nations responsible for the destruction of the Jerusalem Temples.

In deliberate symmetry, the corresponding heaven (Sheḥaqim) houses the reward of the righteous, including the heavenly Jerusalem, the heavenly Temple, and the manna prepared for the just in the world to come. Through this pairing, Seder Rabbah di-Bereshit distributes punishment and reward across matched heavenly and earthly realms.

== Beyond the seven heavens ==
In its most expansive passages, the text extends the cosmos beyond the traditional seven heavens, describing additional realms above the heads of the Ḥayyot, culminating in the Throne of Glory and God enthroned in overwhelming light. This extension explicitly contradicts earlier rabbinic cautions against speculation beyond the permitted limits and signals the bold cosmological ambition of the work.
