= Seven earths =

Division of earth in premodern cosmology

Seven earths is a cosmological doctrine attested in ancient Near Eastern, Jewish, and Islamic traditions, according to which the cosmos is structured into multiple, specifically seven, terrestrial realms, often arranged in parallel with or in symmetry to a corresponding scheme of seven heavens. In some cases, the seven earths may refer to seven layers of the Underworld or Hell.

The seven earths belief first appears in Sumerian literature, likely as a magical or symbolic way to speak about the totality of the cosmos. The doctrine of a real, cosmologically structured seven heavens and seven earths, evolves out of Jewish and Late Antique literature where a growing interest in the depiction of Hell can be found. The earliest traces of the idea are found in texts like the Babylonian Talmud, where the underworld is given seven names. A second layer of texts interprets these seven names, as seven distinct regions of the underworld. Finally, texts such as Leviticus Rabbah, Seder Rabbah di-Bereshit, and more, begin to speak of the idea of seven real and distinct earths. Around this time, the seven earths also appear in the Quran (65:12).

== By genre of literature ==
=== Ancient Near Eastern literature ===
The idea of the seven earths as a counterpart to the seven heavens appears first in Sumerian literature, especially in incantation texts, which had a propensity to speak about the structure of the cosmos. However, within the Mesopotamian context, the seven heavens and earths are likely to refer to a totality of the cosmos with some sort of magical or numerological significance, as opposed to a description of the structural number of heavens and Earth.

Israelite texts do not mention the notion of seven heavens or earths.

=== Seder Rabbah di-Bereshit ===
The Seder Rabbah di-Bereshit, among other Late Antique Jewish cosmological tracts, is unique in its presentation of a doctrine of the seven earths, which mirrors its better-known scheme of seven heavens and extends cosmological multiplicity downward as well as upward. The text presents these earths as distinct, vertically ordered realms, each with specific functions and inhabitants, rather than as poetic synonyms for the terrestrial world. One of the intermediate earths houses Gehinnom, itself subdivided into multiple compartments for the punishment of sinners, while its corresponding heaven contains the reward of the righteous, including the heavenly Jerusalem and Temple. Most strikingly, the lowest earth is not the most degraded but one of the most exalted: it contains the Throne of Glory, the angelic chariot beings, and the Shekhinah (divine presence), thereby collapsing the distinction between heaven and earth at the lowest level of the cosmos. Within the work as a whole, the seven-earths cosmology serves to articulate a radically symmetrical universe in which divine presence frames creation from both above and below, reflecting the text's self-presentation as revealed maʿaseh bereshit rather than exegetical midrash.

=== The Quran and Islamic literature ===
The seven heavens are a mainstay of Quranic cosmology, mentioned throughout the Quran (2:29; 17:44; 23:86; 65:12; 67:3; 71:15), the holy scripture of Islam. In one of these verses, the Quran lays out a vision of cosmological symmetry, by providing a correspondence between the seven heavens and the seven earths. Quran 65:12:

Allah is the One Who created seven heavens in layers, and likewise for the earth. The divine command descends between them so you may know that Allah is Most Capable of everything and that Allah certainly encompasses all things in His knowledge.

According to Julien Decharneux, while acceptance of the seven earths is the common way to read this passage, it is also possible to read the verse as stating that the earth individually, and not in seven, is used as a counterpart to the seven heavens. In any case, the doctrine of the seven earths was widely transmitted in Islamic literature, including in hadith literature like Sahih al-Bukhari.

== See also ==
- Cosmic ocean
- Firmament
- Separation of heaven and earth
