= Early Greek cosmology =

Atlas supporting the heavens beside Prometheus, on a Laconian cup attributed to the Arkesilas Painter, c. 560–550 BC.

Early Greek cosmology refers to beliefs about the origins, development, and structure of the universe in Ancient Greece that existed before the development of Ancient Greek astronomy. The basic elements of this early cosmology included a flat earth, heaven, a cosmic ocean, the afterworld (Hades), and the netherworld (Tartarus). The first three were represented by the gods Gaia, Uranus, and Oceanus (or sometimes Pontus). Ancient Greek cosmology was related to ancient Near Eastern cosmology, and was ultimately replaced by a more systematic and demythologized approach found in ancient Greek astronomy. Its main sources are the poetry of Homer (the Iliad and the Odyssey), Hesiod (the Theogony and the Works and Days), and surviving fragments from Mimnermus.

Beginning in the 5th century BC, elements of the traditional Greek cosmos began to be modified and challenged. One of the earliest of these challenges came from the emergence of the view that the cosmos as a whole was spherical (advocated by Xenophanes, Parmenides, Empedocles, and others). The rotation of the spherical cosmos was said to explain the visible rotation of the stars (an idea called "vortex"). Soon, a spherical model of the earth itself was proposed, which gradually gained acceptance, although the flat earth view never entirely disappeared during either classical antiquity or late antiquity, continuing to receive support from geographers and others like Ctesias, Ephorus, Strabo, Tacitus, and the Epicureans. The last Greek advocate of the traditional cosmology was Cosmas Indicopleustes.

== Overview ==
All models of early Greek cosmology shared the following five elements:

- A solid sky (firmament)
- High ridges at the rim of the (flat) earth
- The sun being close to the earth when it sets and rises
- The sun feeds on vapors from the earth
- The sun and moon are both small compared to the earth

Another important element of early Greek cosmology that would distinguish it from the ancient Greek astronomy that would come to dominate in later centuries was the emphasis on the role of the gods in the past and ongoing history of man and the mythological nature of the surrounding world.

== Background ==
Early Greek cosmology is similar and related to cosmology in the ancient Near East. The famous trio of gods Zeus (king of the gods), Poseidon (god of the sea), and Hades (god of the netherworld) have been described as a "perfect" equivalent to trios of gods in ancient Near Eastern cosmologies, such as Baal, Yam, and Mot in the cosmology of Ugarit, a city that once existed in modern-day West Syria. Hesiod's Theogony is potentially directly textually related to an earlier Hittite cosmology called the Song of Kumarbi.

More broadly, early Greek cosmogonies could derive from an even earlier, Indo-European cosmogony.

== The earth, the cosmic ocean, and Hades ==
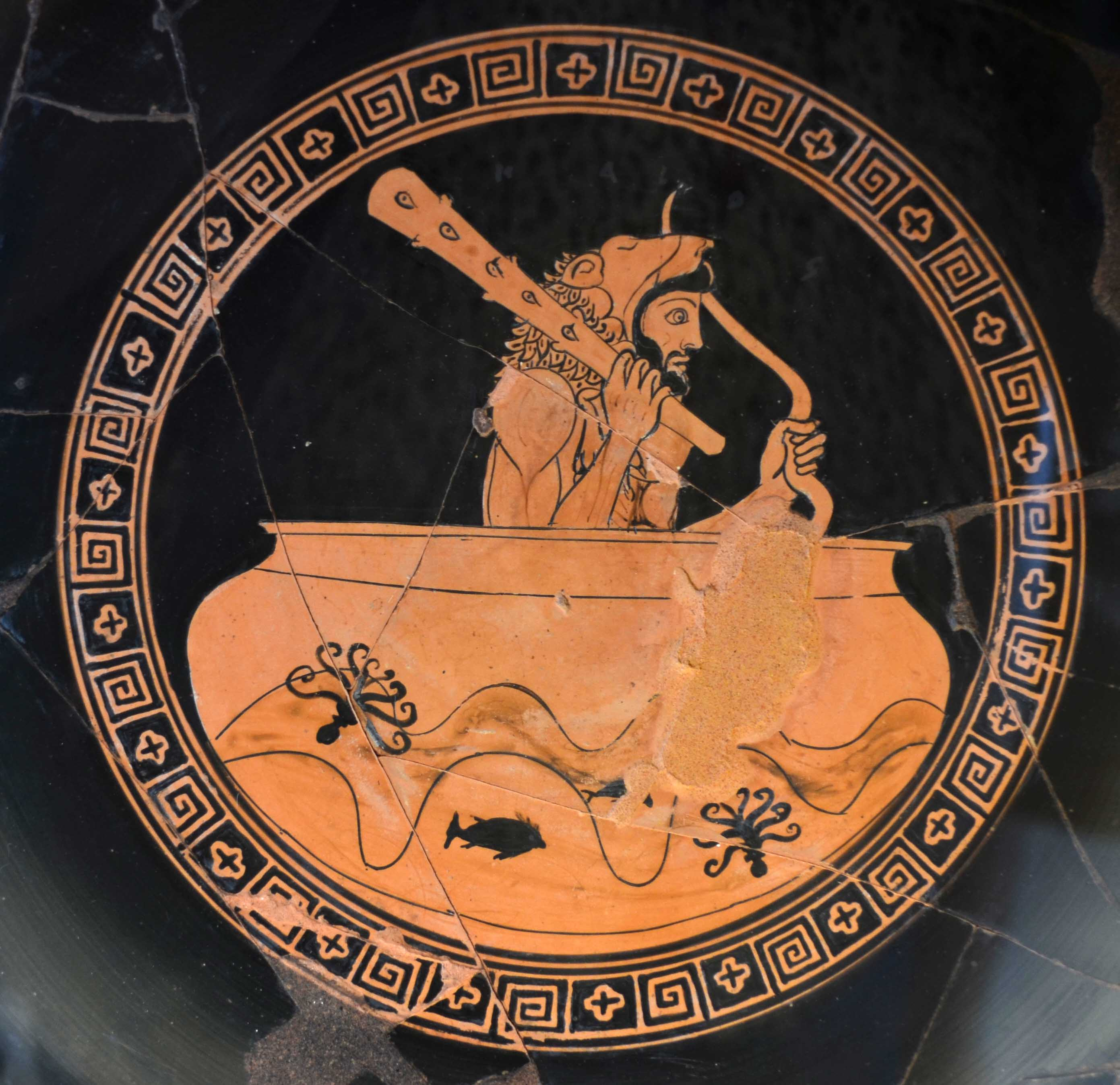
Heracles sailing in the cup of the sun-god Helios, depicted on an Attic red-figure drinking cup, c. 480 BC.

In early Greek cosmology, the earth is a flat, central region surrounded by fantastical creatures, monsters, and quasi-humans at the edges of the earth. The edge was believed to be surrounded by a cosmic ocean, personifying the god Oceanus. The outer edge of the cosmic ocean, Oceanus, is said to be overlaid by the rim of a shield created by Hephaistos, fashioned originally for Achilles.

The cosmic ocean beyond the edges of the earth is also found in other Near Eastern cosmologies, as shown by the Babylonian Map of the World. However, in the Babylonian cosmos, the ocean surrounding the earth extends indefinitely and does not have an end. In the early Greek cosmos, Oceanus is a river and has an outer bank. Beyond the outer bank is a second terrestrial area which can be walked on. In the writings of Hesiod, several beings are located in this outer terrestrial area, such as the Hesperides and Gorgons. The only human said to have reached this area is Heracles, during his journey to find the cattle of Eurytion. This outer region, known as Hades, is also not illuminated by the sun, which only circles above the main terrestrial region inhabited by humans. Hades is spatially described using the Greek words erebos and zophos, which designate a region of darkness unreached by the sun. According to Mimnermus, during the night, the sun lies in a golden chamber located at the banks of the ocean, or perhaps, ends up resting in a barque made by Hephaistos. According to the Homeric literature, the sun rises from Oceanos in the morning and plunges into it at night. An Athenian wine-bowl from c. 430 BC depicts the sun-god Helios being pulled out of the ocean in a chariot driven by winged horses, with stars in the background of the scene setting into the water.

The world terrain that lies past the cosmic ocean Oceanus is known as Hades (the afterworld, not to be confused with Tartarus or the netherworld), which is where all humans go to after death. In other words, Oceanus was the body of water that separated the domains of the living and the dead. In addition, this also implies that in the Greek cosmology, the domains of the living and the dead are on the same horizontal plain, as opposed to a vertical one (meaning that the dead are 'besides' the living, and not in a domain below them). This is reflected by the journey of Odysseus to the afterworld. Odysseus crosses the river ocean, takes a long walk across the banks of the ocean, and then arrives at the place where the rivers Cocytus and Phlegethon join to form the Acheron.

The center of the Earth (axis mundi) is often said to have a cosmic mountain (similar to Mount Mashu in Mesopotamian cosmology) or cosmic tree. In Homer's Iliad, Mount Olympus is the cosmic mountain, and it reaches all the way up to heaven.

The island of Circe functions as a gate that anyone must go through in order to enter Hades from the living world, or to go through if they wish to leave Hades and return to the living world. This island, also called "the dwelling of early Dawn and her dancing-lawns, and the risings of the sun" (Odyssey, Book 12), is near the rising and setting place of the sun. This leads to a paradoxical or counter-intuitive topography where both east and west ultimately collapse into a single point, which disorients Odysseus when he reaches the island, and he says, "we do not know where East is, nor where the bright sun goes down under the earth" (that is, Odysseus cannot tell apart east from west). Like in Egyptian literature, the exit and entry point of the sun into the inhabited world, circumscribed by Oceanus, lie side by side with each other as a double-gate. Likewise in Hesiod's Theogony (lines 750–756), the paths of the sun and moon are contiguous.

== Heaven ==
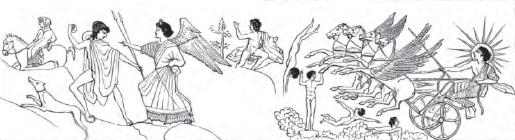
Drawing of the decoration on the Blacas krater, showing Helios, Eos, Selene and other mythological figures, including boys representing setting stars.

The heaven is a flat and solid firmament supported by pillars. Embedded into the firmament was the sun, moon, and the stars. These astral bodies were personified as, themselves, being gods that could be worshiped or prayed to. According to the Theogony of Hesiod, 116–133:

First of all Chaos came into being, and then broad-bosomed Earth (Gaia), a firm seat of all things for ever, and misty Tartaros, deep down in broadpathed earth, and Eros, the most beautiful among the immortal gods, he who loosens our limbs, and subdues the mind and thoughtful counsel of all gods and men. From Chaos, Erebos and black Night came into being, and from Night, again, came Aither and Day, whom she conceived and bore after having mingled in love with Erebos. Now Earth first of all brought forth starry Ouranos, equal to herself, so that it would cover her on all sides, to be a firm seat for the blessed gods forever. She also brought forth large mountains, the beautiful abode of the divine Nymphs who dwell in the woody mountains. She also bore the unharvested sea, seething with its swell, Pontos, without an act of delightful love. Then she slept with Ouranos and bore Okeanos with his deep eddies [...]

Heaven is described once as bronze and twice as iron. One passage in the Iliad, where Zeus makes a cosmic threat against any god who dares to intervene in the Trojan War, provides more information on how heaven relates to the rest of the universe:

I will seize him and hurl him down to Tartaros wrapped in mist,

far away, a place where there is a pit deeper than any other,

where there are iron gates and a bronze threshold,

as far from Hades as heaven is from earth.

Zeus makes a cosmic threat that any such actor will be hurled downwards at an immense distance, whose distance downwards is similar to the distance upwards to the heavens. Later, lines 721–725 reiterate that the region is as far below earth as earth is from heaven: just as it takes ten days for an anvil to fall from heaven to earth, so it takes ten to fall from earth to the underworld. This suggests that the Greeks in this period conceived of the cosmos on a vertical axis, where planes of the cosmos from Tartarus, the earth, and heaven are successively located above each other. Furthermore, the equivalence between the immensity of the directions up and down may also indicate that humans lie on the central plane of this vertical axis.

== Underworld (Tartarus) ==
The underworld in the writings of Hesiod is an immense, dark, and enclosed region called "Tartarus". Tartarus is not a part of the underworld but rather its whole. Three different images of Tartarus can also be painted, depending on the observer. The Titans, sealed into Tartarus by Zeus during the Titanomachy, view it as an inescapable walled enclosure. The entities of Night, Day, Sleep, and Death effectively experience it as a house: it can be entered into and left at will. (These entities all reside in Tartarus, and so Tartarus can be said to house the cyclical phenomena of night, day, sleep, and death.) Finally, from the viewpoint of human topography, it can be understood as a great gorge. These images are also not mutually exclusive: the Titans have an increased difficulty of escaping from Tartarus, such as to the earth, due to the depth of the gorge. Hesiod offers multiple descriptions of features of the underworld, and sometimes they come into tension with each other. According to Johnson, the proper way to read Hesiod so as to avoid encountering such tensions, according to Hesiod's own intentions, is to understand that "Hesiod is not attempting to provide a map of the various structures within the underworld but is giving separate descriptions of the underworld as a whole".

Hesiod refers to a fence enclosing Tartarus, as well as Poseidon's doors and an associated wall; Johnson believes that these terms are referring to the same barrier. Tartarus is a great windy chasm. Some passages locate Atlas in Tartarus but others place it in the far west with the Hesperides, past Oceanus. Other evidence also indicates that Tartarus is both located below the earth but is also to be found at its edges. Thus, Tartarus extends such that some regions of it can be found vertically below the earth whereas others can be found horizontally surrounding it. Hesiod also places in Tartarus a house of Sleep and Death. Finally, the river and goddess Styx, who is the offspring of Oceanus and Tethys, flows into the underworld. The direct source for the water of the Styx river is Oceanus: once Styx parts from Oceanus, Styx flows into much of the underworld in both horizontal and vertical directions. Styx may be visualized as a singular stream starting at the horizon and then parting into multiple individual streams downwards.

== Cosmogony and theogony ==
Whereas the structure of the cosmos is the domain of cosmography, the origins of the cosmos is the domain of cosmogony. Cosmogony and theogony (the origins of the gods) are also deeply interrelated, as many gods were identified with major features of the cosmos, and explaining the origin of the god is tantamount to explaining the origin of that part of the world.

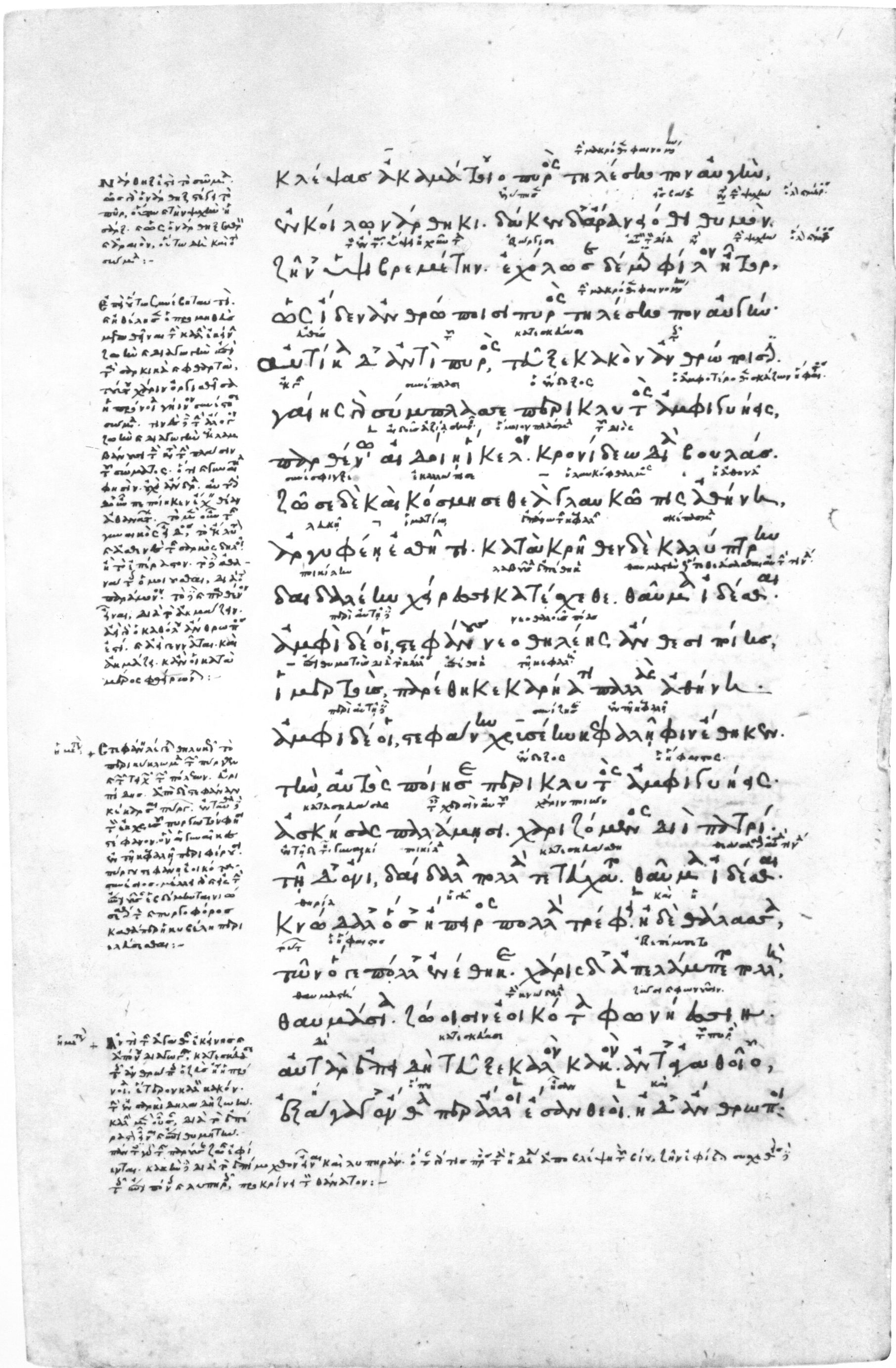
Hesiod's Theogony with accompanying scholia in a manuscript dated 1319, now in the Biblioteca Marciana in Venice.

In early Greek cosmology, Chaos has always existed and is the primordial matter, and out of it creation arises. Cosmic guardians ensure that the creation does not slip back into a status of unordered chaos, for example: "Sun will not overstep his measures; otherwise the Erinyes, guardians of Dike, will find him out." Chaos gave rise to Uranus, Gaia, and Pontus (heaven, earth, sea) who, by association or sexual union, bring forth the rest of the gods. The generation of the gods quickly gave rise to cosmic struggles that threatened the order of the universe, such as the Titanomachy, or the primordial war between Zeus and the Titans. Eventually, Zeus and the Hundred-Armed drove the Titans from the earth into the netherworld, Tartarus, where they were locked away with a wall and fence with giant bronze doors.

A major event during the creation of the cosmos is the separation of heaven and earth. This event is described by Euripides, according to a lost fragment of his work quoted by Diodorus:

And the tale is not mine but from my mother, how sky and earth were one form; and when they had been separated apart from each other they bring forth all things, and give them up into light; trees, birds, beasts, the creatures nourished by the salt sea, and the race of mortals

Some have interpreted Hesiod's Theogony to also possess indications of the idea of a separation between heaven and earth. Explicitly, the idea is also found in the Bibliotheca historica (1.7.1) of Diodorus Siculus and in the Argonautica (1.496) of Apollonius of Rhodes. In the latter, Orpheus sings of "how earth and heaven and sea were once joined in one form, and by deadly strife were separated each from the other".

The god Oceanus, representing the earth-encircling ocean, had a sister and wife named Tethys, the god of freshwater, rivers, and springs. These salt- and fresh-water gods mated to generate the next generation of gods, mimicing earlier Mesopotamian cosmologies (like the pair Tiamat and Abzu) as well as later Greek cosmologies, including one reported by Plato (Timaeus 40e). The idea of salt and freshwater blending, personified by deities, may have been originally inspired by hydrological observations. The name of the island-country Bahrain means "Two Seas", in reference to the meeting and mingling of fresh and salt water seas.

== See also ==
- Jewish cosmology
- Quranic cosmology
- Zoroastrian cosmology
- Planetae
