= Creation of life =

The creation of life may refer to:

- Origin of life, current scientific beliefs about the beginning of living things on Earth
- Creation myths, cultural and/or religious beliefs
- Creation of life from clay, a recurring myth about miraculous births
- Synthetic life
