= Sarim (disambiguation) =

The Sarim were a faction of scholars prominent in Korean politics between the 15th and the 18th centuries.

Sarim may also refer to:

- Sarim (angel), a class of angels in the Bible
- Sarim (dessert), a dessert in Thai cuisine

== People with the name ==
- Sarim Momin (born 1978), Indian screenplay writer, film director, and lyricist
- Shir Sarim, 16th-century Kurdish leader

== See also ==
- Beth Sarim, a mansion in San Diego, California
