= Q65 =

Q65 can refer to:

- Q65 (band), a Dutch rock band
- Q65 (New York City bus)
- At-Talaq, the 65th surah of the Quran
- French submarine Fresnel (Q65)
