= Zoroastrian cosmology =

Zoroastrian or Iranian cosmology refers to the origins (cosmogony) and structure (cosmography) of the cosmos in Zoroastrianism. Zoroastrian literature describing cosmographical beliefs include the Avesta (especially in its description of Avestan geography) and, in later Middle Persian literature, texts including the Bundahishn, Denkard, and the Wizidagiha-i Zadspram.

== Cosmogony ==
=== Overview ===
According to the Zoroastrian creation myth, there is one universal, transcendent, all-good, and uncreated supreme creator deity Ahura Mazda, or the "Wise Lord" (ahura meaning "lord" and mazda meaning "wisdom" in Avestan), omniscient although not omnipotent.

Ahura Mazda existed in light and goodness above, while Angra Mainyu (or "Ahriman") existed in darkness and ignorance below. They have existed independently of each other for all time, and manifest contrary substances. In the Gathas, Ahura Mazda works through emanations known as the Amesha Spenta and with the help of "other ahuras". These emanations support him and held to represent and guard different aspects of creation and the ideal personality. Ahura Mazda is immanent in humankind and interacts with creation through these bounteous/holy divinities. He is also assisted by a league of divinities called Yazatas, meaning "worthy of worship." Each is a hypostasis of a moral or physical aspect of creation. Asha is the main spiritual force which comes from Ahura Mazda. It is the cosmic order and is the antithesis of chaos, which is evident as druj, falsehood and disorder, that comes from Angra Mainyu. The resulting cosmic conflict involves all of creation, mental/spiritual and material, including humanity at its core, which has an active role to play in the conflict. The main representative of Asha in this conflict is Spenta Mainyu, the creative spirit/mentality. Ahura Mazda created the material and visible world itself in order to ensnare evil. He created the floating, egg-shaped universe in two parts: first the spiritual (menog) and 3,000 years later, the physical (getig). Ahura Mazda then created Gayomard, the archetypical perfect man, and Gavaevodata, the primordial bovine.

=== Creation myth and eschatology ===
While Ahura Mazda created the universe and humankind, Angra Mainyu, whose very nature is to destroy, miscreated demons, evil daevas, and noxious creatures (khrafstar) such as snakes, ants, and flies. Angra Mainyu created an opposite, evil being for each good being, except for humans, which he found he could not match. Angra Mainyu invaded the universe through the base of the sky, inflicting Gayomard and the bull with suffering and death. However, the evil forces were trapped in the universe and could not retreat. The dying primordial man and bovine emitted seeds, which were protect by Mah, the Moon. From the bull's seed grew all beneficial plants and animals of the world and from the man's seed grew a plant whose leaves became the first human couple. Humans thus struggle in a two-fold universe of the material and spiritual trapped and in long combat with evil. The evils of this physical world are not products of an inherent weakness but are the fault of Angra Mainyu's assault on creation. This assault turned the perfectly flat, peaceful, and daily illuminated world into a mountainous, violent place that is half night. According to Zoroastrian cosmology, in articulating the Ahuna Vairya formula, Ahura Mazda made the ultimate triumph of good against Angra Mainyu evident. Ahura Mazda will ultimately prevail over the evil Angra Mainyu, at which point reality will undergo a cosmic renovation called Frashokereti and limited time will end. In the final renovation, all of creation—even the souls of the dead that were initially banished to or chose to descend into "darkness"—will be reunited with Ahura Mazda in the Kshatra Vairya (meaning "best dominion"), being resurrected to immortality.

== Cosmography ==
=== Cosmos as a whole ===
Avestan sources regularly describe the cosmos as being constituted by the heaven and earth, for example, some phrases that appear include "we worship the earth and the heaven" and "between heaven and earth". The original separation of the heavens and the earth is attributed to Ahura Mazda. One text enumerates the elements of the cosmos as follows:

Seven referring to different kinds of stars;

Two referring to the Luminaries (Moon and Sun);

Three referring to the highest paradisiacal abode.

The total sum of all the mentioned loci, starting with the seven continents of the earth and stopping with the Paradise, is of twenty-nine

Other descriptions of the cosmos reflect the creations of Ohrmazd. In one text, during his creation of the heaven, he creates the stars, the twelve signs of the Zodiac (constellations; just called the "twelve ones") corresponding to the twelve months of the year, the twenty-seven or twenty-eight lunar mansions, as well as 6,488,000 supporting small stars for the constellations.

=== Heaven ===
The Zoroastrian conception of heaven initially divided it into three levels. The lowest is the heaven of the stars, followed by the heaven of the moon, and the highest is the heaven of the sun, closest to the abode of Ahura Mazda and where Paradise lies, unreachable by Ahriman. Above the heavens themselves are the "Endless Lights". Pahlavi sources suggest that the distance between each of these stations is the equivalent of 34,000 parasangs. In later literature, numerous models emerged and elaborated on this basic framework. In one, the lowest heaven of the stars is itself split into four levels, encompassing the heaven of the stars with (1) the seed or nature of the waters (2) having the seed or nature of the earth (3) having the seed or nature of the plants (4) of the Holy Spirit. Another representation is that the sky/heaven itself is spherical. The innermost sphere is the zodiacal sphere insofar as it contains the twelve constellations as well as other zodiacal stars. Above the sphere of the sun is the Throne (gāh) of the Amahraspandān. This Throne is in contact with the Throne of Ohrmazd and Endless Light. Another model describes seven heavenly stations: the clouds, the sphere of the stars, the sphere of the unmixable stars, moon, sun, Throne of Amahraspandan, and the Endless Light where Ohrmazd's Throne is located. Some additions, such as the lowermost station of the clouds, reflects astronomical additions to what was originally a mythical conception of the heavens. One text to elaborate the original threefold sky into a sevenfold one was the Bundahishn.

The source for tripartite sky (heaven) has been discussed extensively, especially in relation to ancient near eastern cosmology, early Greek cosmology (especially in Anaximander), and Hindu cosmology. All three had tripartite skies, although the order of astral bodies was different in the Vedic texts. Recent evidence indicates the Zoroastrian tripartite sky and the Zoroastrian tradition of uranography was not independent, but is thought to instead have been influenced by cosmological traditions originating in Mesopotamia. In turn, the Zoroastrian tradition may have been passed on to Greek sources. The placement of the moon further up than the stars was maintained despite evidence that Sasanian astronomers knew that this was observationally impossible. Furthermore, other influences from Greek and Indian sources on Zoroastrian cosmography are likely, such as the introduction of the notion of sphericity from Greek influences (with respect to both the heaven and earth) and the concept of planetary motion (especially retrogradation) being determined by celestial cords or ropes. The exact source for the rope concept is unclear: it could ultimately come from Plato's Timaeus 38a–39a which describes "living bonds" that control the movements of the heavenly bodies. At some point in late antiquity, these ropes took on an antidemonic role insofar as they were a mechanism by which shooting stars could be directed at and striking demons, a notion shared in Zoroastrian, Manichaean, and Mandaean thought.

Avestan liturgy worshiped the sky or heavens as a divinity, created without support or pillars over forty days as the first of seven acts of creation (in the order of: heavens, earth, water, plants, cattle, man, fire). The sky can be referred to as nabah or "mist, cloud, vapor".

=== Earth ===
The Earth is said to have a cosmic mountain known as the Harā Bərəz. This mountain's peak, called Taēra, lies at the world center of the (flat) Earth, similar to the role played by Mount Meru in Hindu, Jain, and Buddhist cosmologies. The Earth also has three "Aquatic Features," three "Terrestrial Features," and three "Mountainous Features". The latter correspond to mount Harā, mount Hukairiia, and the Peak of Haraitī. The peak of the mountains reach the atmosphere, and at least two of them are astronomical, insofar as the star Sadwēs rotates around the peak of Mount Hukairiia and, according to a text known as Rašn Yašt, the stars, sun, and moon revolve around the peak of Mount Haraitī. Furthermore, Mount Harā is sometimes expressed to be the first mountain in a chain of 2,244 mountains that circle the outer edge of the Earth. Harā also represents the most prominent peak, as the suns nearness to it ensures that it never experiences night.

The mountains were placed into the earth while it was being created in order to help anchor it. When it first rained, the earth was divided into seven primary landmasses or continents. The first human couple were the progeny of Gayōmard. Life and movement was made possible by the protection of fire.

=== Planets ===
Familiarity of the planets, such as Mercury and Venus, is absent from early Iranian and Zoroastrian sources like the Avesta, likely reflecting the disinterest in them or classifying them into astronomical or astrological systems. A term like "constellation" denoting a general group of stars also was not used in this early period, although a plural for the word for star existed as well as some terms for some specific star clusters, like the Pleiades. Overall, however, knowledge of the main stars and star groups remained archaic. On the other hand, an interest was taken up with astral bodies of irregular movement, particularly falling stars (or meteors) and bolides (meteors which explode in the atmosphere), as opposed to 'fixed' stars (i.e. stars which did not have any visible movement and were thought to be fixed in the firmament). These irregularly moving stars were considered to be demons/witches (pairikās). By the time of Middle Persian literature, the names of all five (known) planets were documented as a product of Babylonian influence: Anāhīd (Pahlavi for Venus), Tīr (Mercury), Wahrām (Mars), Ohrmazd (Jupiter), and Kēwān (Saturn). Of all the planet names, only Kēwān is derived from Mesopotamian (in particular, Akkadian) influences.

The planets were also demonized as they took on the role of the astral mythology of the falling stars, being called demons, robbers, bandits, etc. This can be contextualized into the arena of other cosmological traditions, such as Mandaean cosmology, where all planets including the two luminaries (sun and moon) were demonized, Manichaean cosmology, where all planets excluding the two luminaries were demonized, and Mazdakite cosmology, where all astral bodies were viewed positively.

== See also ==
- Early Greek cosmology
- Hexaemeron
- Jewish cosmology
- Quranic cosmology
