= Wizidagiha-i Zadspram =

9th-century Zoroastrian text

The Wizīdagīhā-ī Zādspram (or Vizīdagīhā-ī Zādspram), also known as the Anthology or Selections of Zadspram, is a Pahlavi language composition of Zoroastrian literature from the 9th-century scholar and high priest Zadspram, who was primarily active ca. 880 AD. His works were composed closely in time to the Denkard and the Bundahishn and treats similar subjects, but is independent of them. The primary subject matters of the book include a description of Zoroastrian cosmology, the life of the prophet Zoroaster, and then the eschatological end. The work also delves into matters of medicine, astrology, and zoology. Some sections of the work derive from the Zend, an earlier Zoroastrian commentary.

Alongside the Bundahisn, the Selections of Zadspram is one of the two primary systematic treatments of Zoroastrian cosmology known from Zoroastrian literature.

== Zoology ==
The third chapter of the Anthologies fixates on enumerating the different types of living species. This section is likely reliant on the lost Dāmdād nask (Division on Creation) from the Avesta. Zadspram also refers to a zoological book of his which is now lost.

The Haoma, a sacred Zoroastrian plant, also figures in the text.

== Astrology ==
The thirtieth chapter discusses what is part of what has been called the microcosm and macrocosm theory, namely, the idea that there is a structural semblance between the human being (microcosm) and the cosmos (macrocosm). Zād 30.5–12 posits that the human body has seven innermost to outermost layers, and that each one of these is governed by one or two heavenly bodies, of the seven total heavenly bodies (the sun, moon, and the five known planets besides the Earth at the time). For the bone marrow, this is the descending lunar node and the moon. Mercury governs the moon, Venus governs the flesh, the sun governs the nerves, Mars governs the veins, Jupiter covers the skin, and Saturn governs the hair. This type of description reflects what is known as melothesia or medical astrology, a subbranch of astrology that seeks to explain the influences of the seven signs of the zodiac onto the different parts of the human body, and has its roots in earlier forms of Greek astrology. The seven parts of the human body here are also listed in other examples of Pahlavi literature, like the Bundahishn.

== Structure ==
The text contains 35 chapters. According to Tavadia, the book involves a three-fold division covering the cosmological/creation phase, a phase covering the life of Zoroaster, and finally the eschatological end. Gignoux-Tafazzoli propose a four-fold division to the work:

- Chapters 1–3: Mazdean cosmogony and the phases of creation.
- Chapters 4–26: Legendary events of the life of Zoroaster.
- Chapters 27–28: The five characters of priests, the ten counsels for pious men, and the threefold division of religion.
- Chapters 29–30: A separate third section. The composition of a human person according to a fourfold scheme.
- Chapters 34–35: General eschatology and the events of the end of times.

== Editions ==
- Anklesaria, B.T. Vichitakiha-i Zatsparam with Text and Introduction. Part I. Bombay. 1964.
- Rāšed-Moḥaṣṣel, M. T. Gozidehā-ye Zādsparam [Selections of Zādsparam]. Teheran. 1987.
- Gignoux and Tafazzoli, Anthologie de Zādspram, Studia Iranica, Cahier 13, Paris, 1993.
- Sohn, P. 1996. Die Medizin des Zādsparam. Anatomie, Physiologie und Psychologie in den Wizīdagīhā ī Zādsparam, einer zoroastrischmittelpersischen Anthologie aus dem frühislamischen Iran des neunten Jahrhunderts. Wiesbaden (Iranica 3).

An earlier edition was published by M.B. Davar in 1908, but all known copies were lost in a 1945 fire. The edition by Anklesaria was based on the manuscripts K35 (16th c.), BK, and TD. These manuscripts are all incomplete. The more recent edition by Gignoux and Tafazzoli is based on K35 and Anklesaria's earlier edition.

In addition, a glossary has been published of the text:

- Bahār, M. Vāže-nāme-ye Gozīdehā-ye Zādesparam [Glossary of the Selections of Zādspram]. Teheran. 1972.

== Translations ==
Several sections of the Anthologies have been translated in different volumes of the 50-volume Sacred Books of the East collection as well as other volumes:

- Chapters 1–3 in Volume 5 of Sacred Books of the East
- Chapters 4–27 in Volume 47 of Sacred Books of the East
- Chapter 28 in Volume 37 of Sacred Books of the East
- Chapters 1 and 24 by Zaehner
- Chapters 29 and 30 by Bailey

== See also ==
- Ancient near eastern cosmology
- Hexaemeron
