= Song-Uttering Choirs =

Apocryphal class of angels

In 3 Enoch, the Song-Uttering Choirs are a collective class of angels who frequently sing the Trisagion and reside in Makon, the 5th Heaven, alongside the Ishim. If any of these angels fail to perform the Trisagion at the right time, they are consumed by fire. They are all under the direction of Tagas (תגעץ), the angel of music.

The twelve orders of angels, which are said to belong to this class, are listed as follows:

- The Shalishim (שָֽׁלִישִׁים) - the "Captains", the "Adjutants".
- The Parashim (פָּרָשִׁים) - the "Horsemen".
- The Gibborim (גִּבּוֺרִים) - the "Mighty Ones", the "Champions", the "Warriors".
- The Tseba'im (Tzeva'im, צְבָאִים) or Tseba'oth (Tzeva'ot, צְבָאוֺת) - the "Hosts", the "Multitudes".
- The Gedudim (גְּדוּדִים) - the "Troops", the "Raiders".
- The Memunim (מְמֻנִּים) - the "Appointed Ones", the "Deputies".
- The Sarim (שָׂרִים) - the "Princes", the "Commanders", the "Chieftains".
- The Chayalim (חֲיָלִים) - the "Armies", the "Soldiers".
- The Mesharethim (Mesharetim, מְשָׁרְתִים) - the "Servants", the "Ministers".
- The Malakhim (מַלְאָכִים) - the "Messengers", the "Kings".
- The Degalim (דְגָלִים) - the "Divisions", the "Battalions", the "Standards".
- The Sabalim (Sabbalim, סַבָּלִים) - the "Transporters", the "Bearers of Burdens".

== See also ==
- List of angels in theology

== Sources ==
- Davidson, Gustav. A Dictionary of Angels: Including the Fallen Angels. Free Press. 1971.
- Odeberg, Hugo. 3 Enoch, or The Hebrew Book of Enoch. Cambridge University Press. 1928.
