= Hwangto =

Korean Loess - Hwangto, the soil of life (Fertile Earth) 무안 황토

Hwangto (황토), a Korean loess soil, is a yellow-coloured soil, which contains high levels of potassium chloride and calcium. Hwangto is sometimes called a 'living soil' for its medical effects. Korean loess called “Hwangto”or “the red yellow soil or earth” has been a basic element or nourishment which has cultivated Korean nature and cultural heritages. Hwangto reveals its unique natural character as a lenient and honest soil which can tolerate and accommodate various materials including even toxic character. Hwangto a special yellow soil from Korea used in purifying and cleansing treatments; it has special properties to filter out toxins and boost circulation and metabolism.

== Scientific aspects ==
A particle size analysis of the soils indicates that the residual soil consists of mainly silt and clay (approximately 95%) and that soil textures are silty clay or silt clay loam. The soil colors of the residual soil are dark brown (7.5YR 3/4) through yellowish red (5YR 4/6). The pH of the residual soil ranges from 4.3 to 5.1. The major minerals of the parent rocks were quartz, biotite, chlorite, and plagioclase. The mineralogy of the sand fraction of the residual soil was quartz, biotite, muscovite and sanidine.

=== Five Coloured Noble Soil ===
Osec Hwangto; as listed in International Cosmetic Ingredient Dictionary and commonly known as Five Coloured Noble Soil; Osec in Korean means five different colours and Hwangto is the special loess in Korea. Osechwangto contains significant amount of minerals and live enzyme and is a patented mixture of Terracotta, Loess, Bauxite, Black Soil and White Soil, and is predominately used in production of cosmetics. Ingredients for Osec Hwangto naturally matured over the period of 5,000 years with mountain rafts, pines and other plant extracts and occurs in Gyeongsangnam-do and is harvested from 400 meter highland.

== In Korean history and culture ==
Hwangto has a close connection with Korean culture and history. Records of Hwangto can be found in Shan Hai Jing and China's classic geography book; The Annals of the Joseon Dynasty, which is listed on UNESCO's Memory of the World Programme. Dongui Bogan (1590~1610), the classical compilation of traditional Korean medicine, narrates the usefulness associated with Hwangto to cure common diseases. Koreans believe that "Osechwangto" has the power to heal and cure our mind and body.

In preparation for the Wind God deity’s start in the human world (Grandma Yeongdeung) arrival, households scattered yellow soil (loess soil) outside the gate to mark the area as sacred.
