= Nūḥ =

71st chapter of the Qur'an

Surah 71 of the Quran
نوح Nūḥ Noah
- Qira'ah; English text
- Classification: Meccan
- Position: Juzʼ 29
- No. of verses: 28
- No. of Rukus: 2
- No. of words: 227
- No. of letters: 965

Nūḥ (Arabic: نوح, “Noah”) is the seventy-first chapter (surah) of the Quran and is composed of 28 verses (ayat). It is centered around the Islamic prophet Nūḥ and his complaint about his people rejecting all warnings Allah gave them through Nuh. The chapter's themes include tawhid (belief in Allah), signs of Allah (the Earth, Sun, Moon), and punishment for denying Allah's message.

== Summary ==
In Nuh, the seventy-first surah, the Quran refers to Nuh’s prophethood in snippets. Nuh is a messenger of God. When Nuh realizes the messages are not accepted by the community, he supplicated to God, who planned to flood the community of Nuh at a specified time. God commanded Nuh to warn the people.

== Ayat (verses) ==
1-4 Noah sent as a warner; his message to his people
5-20 Noah’s people refuse to believe him, notwithstanding every effort
21-26 The people of Noah plot against him and are destroyed
27-28 Noah prays for the destruction of the infidels, and for the pardon of his parents and the true believers

== Exegesis ==
=== 1-4 Noah receives message from God ===
Verses 1–4 discuss the message Nuh received from God (Allah) to share with his community, to serve God.

=== 5-20 the Earth, the sun, the moon are signs of God's existence ===
In Verses 5–20, Nuh informs Allah that his people are not accepting his message. Nuh tries to make clear to the people that all of the Earth, the Sun, the Moon are signs of God's existence.

=== 21-25 rid the world of the evildoers ===
In Verses 21–24, Nuh asks Allah to rid the world of the evildoers because they refused to abandon their idols and encourage others to do the same.

=== 26-28 disbelievers all drowned ===
In Verses 26–28, the disbelievers were all drowned and sent to hell (as a result of the flood). Nuh asks Allah to forgive the believers and to destroy the disbelievers because their faith will lead many astray.

== Surah chronology ==
The surah is entirely Meccan, meaning it was revealed while Muhammad was trying to create a Muslim community in Mecca and before he migrated to Madina. According to the Tanzil version, it was the seventy-first surah revealed. It was revealed after the sixteenth surah, An-Nahl ("The Bee"), and before the fourteenth surah, Ibrahim ("Abraham"). According to Theodor Nöldeke, Nūḥ was the fifty-third surah to be revealed. It was revealed after the thirty-seventh surah, As-Saaffaat ("Those Who Set The Ranks"), and before the seventy-sixth surah, Al-Insaan or Ad-Dahr ("Man" or "Time").
