= Separation of heaven and earth =

Creation myth event

The separation of heaven and earth is a cross-cultural creation myth event. The separation serves the role of differentiating the chaotic, undifferentiated cosmos (sometimes interpreted as a universal cosmic ocean) into coherent and organized parts.

The mechanics and cause differ from one story to another, but is usually either a spontaneous process, or a result of the agency of a deity. In ancient Near Eastern texts, the original mass that is separated is a solid in older Sumerian literature, but becomes a water in younger Akkadian literature (such as the Enuma Elish). Sumerian literature mentions the separation event most frequently than any other.

== By region ==
=== Ancient Near East ===
Heaven and earth are described as being in a cosmic and physical, symbolized as a marriage, in the earliest literature from the ancient Near East (like the Sumerian Song of the hoe), and as a common and recurring mythological motif later (like in the Danaids of Aeschylus). In the 2nd millennium BC, some texts shift emphasis from the union, to the separation, between heaven and earth, an idea that begins to be seen not only in Sumerian but also in Akkadian, Phoenician, Egyptian, and Greek mythologies.

One source says that the separation happens over the course of "long days and nights" by Anu, the King of Heaven, and Enlil, the King of Earth. According to one cuneiform tablet (KAR 4): "After heaven was made distant and separated from earth, (its) trusty companion". The event is also mentioned in many other Sumerian sources (including Lugalbanda in the Mountain Cave, the Debate between silver and copper, Enki and Ninmah, OIP 99 113 ii and 136 iii, etc). One version, in Gilgamesh, Enkidu, and the Netherworld, says that heaven was carried off from the earth by the sky god Anu to become the possession of the wind god Enlil.

Akkadian sources also have this idea, prominently including the Enuma Elish, where Marduk divides the corpse of the slain primordial goddess Tiamat into two, one stretched out to create heaven, the other to create the earth:

135 The Lord [Marduk] rested, examining her [Tiamat's] dead body, 136. To divide the abortion (and) to create ingenious things (therewith). 137. He split her open like a mussel (?) into two (parts); 138. Half of her he set in place and formed the sky (therewith) as a roof....

The separation event is also found in Hittite texts. In the Song of Kumarbi, it is implicit. It is explicit in the Song of Ullikummi, where the giant Upelluri, a counterpart of Atlas, say: "When heaven and earth were built upon me I knew nothing of it, and when they came and cut heaven and earth asunder with a cleaver I knew nothing of it."

=== Arabian Peninsula ===
In the Quran, the canonical scripture of Islam that comes from the Arabian Peninsula, the separation myth is mentioned as a belief that is held in common between itself and in its existing religious environment. Recently found pre-Islamic inscriptions suggest this belief was inherited from older Arabian religions that are more closely related to ancient Near Eastern creation myths. The Quran says:

(21:30) Do those who disbelieve not see that the heavens and the earth were (once) a solid mass [ratq], and We split the two of them apart [fa-fataqnā-humā], and We made every living thing from water?

In the Quran, ratq (translated as "solid mass") is a hapax legomenon, a word that only appears one time in the text. In subsequent Arabic dictionaries, it means something that is patched up or sewn together, meaning that heaven and earth were once connected to one another. The separation is described using the verb fataqa, meaning "splitting, cleaving, unstitching, unsewing".

=== China ===
In Chinese mythology and in Taoism, heaven and earth are separated. In earlier sources, this is a process that happens spontaneously. Later sources, after a primordial being named Pangu (P'an Ku) had been transformed into a great deity and the creator of heaven and earth, relate the separation of the two to Pangu. In earlier sources, Pangu is originally inside of heaven and earth. The three of them grow over the course of 18,000 years, eventually separating. In the Wuyan Linianji, the growth and separation of heaven and earth occurs naturally, and only later does Pangu begin to grow. In later texts, once Pangu had become transformed into the creator of heaven and earth, the growing body of Pangu is the cause of the separation of heaven and earth. Other late sources have heaven and earth being created out of distinct parts of the corpse of Pangu.

One instance of the Pangu myth involving the separation myth is the Record of Cycles in Threes and Fives (3rd century AD):

Heaven and Earth were once inextricably commingled like a chicken's egg, within which was engendered Pan-ku. After 18,000 years, this mass split apart, what was bright and light forming Heaven, and what was dark and heavy forming Earth.

The Pangu tale is not the only Chinese tradition with the separation myth. It also occurs in a few texts predating the common era, one being the Classic of History.

=== Egypt ===
The god Shu (the air) separating to the goddess Nut (the Sky) and the god Geb (the Earth).

The separation myth is a familiar motif in the religious literature of Egypt, exemplified by its classic formulation, that "Shu separates the sky (Nut) from earth (Geb)" appearing in many texts.

One of the Pyramid Texts (1208c) refers to "when the sky was separated from the earth". In the Coffin Texts:

For I [Shu] am weary at the Uplifting of Shu / Since I lifted my daughter Nut atop me / That I might give her to my father Atum in his utmost extent / I have put Geb under my feet.

=== Greece ===
Some have seen hints of the myth of the separation of heaven and earth in Hesiod's Theogony. The separation myth is explicitly described by Euripides, a playwright of the 5th century BC, preserved in a fragment from his lost play Melanippe the Wise, reported by Diodorus

And the tale is not mine but from my mother, how sky and earth were one form; and when they had been separated apart from each other they bring forth all things, and give them up into light; trees, birds, beasts, the creatures nourished by the salt sea, and the race of mortals

The idea is also found in the Bibliotheca historica (1.7.1) of Diodorus Siculus and in the Argonautica (1.496) of Apollonius of Rhodes. In the latter, Orpheus sings of "how earth and heaven and sea were once joined together in one form, and by deadly strife were separated each from the other".

=== India ===
The separation myth appears in Hindu cosmology, including in the Rigveda, one of the four canonical texts of the Hindu scripture of the Vedas:

The Father of the Eye, who is wise in his heart, created as butter these two worlds that bent low. As soon as their ends had been made fast in the east, at that moment sky and earth moved far apart. (10.82.1)

The generations have become wise by the power of him who has propped apart the two world-halves even though they are so vast. He has pushed away the dome of the sky to make it high and wide; he has set the sun on its double journey and spread out the earth (7.86.1)

=== New World ===
The separation myth occurs among the natives of both the North and South Americas.

=== Oceania and Indonesia ===
In Oceania (especially Polynesia), as well as in Indonesia, a myth appears that begins with a primordial sexual union between Heaven (Rangi) and Earth (Papa), and then describes their separation.

In the creation according to the Māori:

Rangi and Papa, or Heaven and Earth, were the source from which in the beginning all things originated. Darkness then rested upon the heaven and upon the earth, and they still both clave together, for they had not yet been rent apart.. . . Now are rent apart Rangi and Papa, and with cries and groans of woe they shriek aloud: 'Wherefore slay you thus your parents ? Why commit you so dreadful a crime as to slay us, as to rend your parents apart?

And in the creation story from the Gilbert Islands:

in the beginning there was nothing in the Darkness and the Cleaving-together save one person. . . . Heaven was like hard rock that stuck to the earth. And heaven and earth were called the Darkness and Cleaving together Then Na Arean called to him Riiki that great Eel and said, "Sir, thou art long and taut: thou shalt lift the heavens on thy snout." .. . Na Arean called aloud, saying, "Lift, lift." But Riiki answered, " I can no more, for heaven clings to the underworld." . . . He said again, "Slide sideways and cut. Heaven clings to the underworld." They answered, "We cut, we cut." .. . So Riiki the Eel raised the heavens aloft, and the earth sank under the sea.

== See also ==
- Seven earths
- Seven heavens
