= Seven heavens =

Divisions of heaven in esoteric cosmology

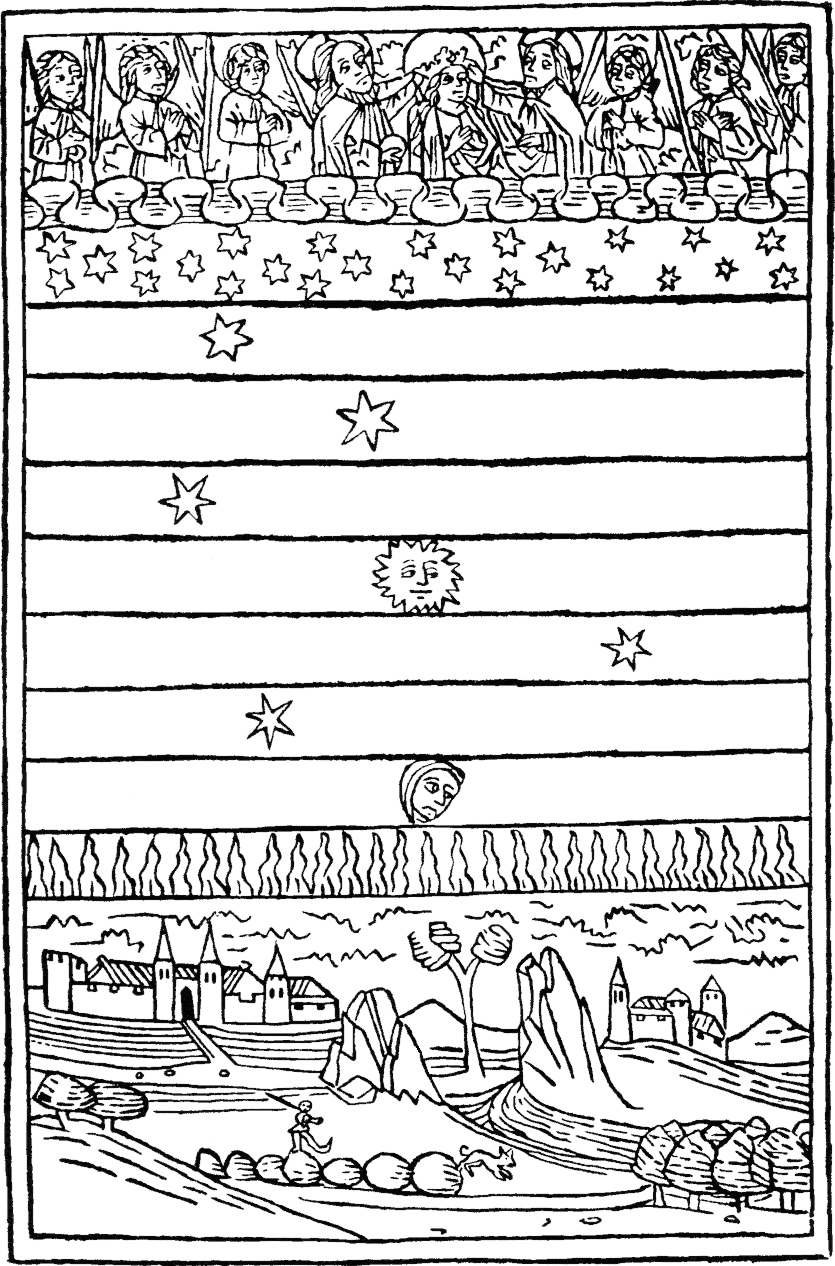
A wood carving from 1475, showing seven celestial bodies. The five planets that can be seen with the naked eye, and the Sun and the Moon, each floating in a heavenly layer, the Arabic Felaq in ancient cosmology.

In ancient Near Eastern cosmology, the seven heavens refer to seven firmaments or physical layers located above the open sky. The concept can be found in ancient Mesopotamian religion, Judaism, Christianity, and Islam. Some traditions complement the seven heavens with an idea of the seven earths or seven underworlds. These heavens or underworlds have been conceived of as realms with deities or celestial bodies (such as the classical planets and fixed stars).

Variants of the seven heavens tradition existed. Ancient Near Eastern cosmology more often described the number of heavens and earths as three, instead of seven. Seven as the number of heavens was the most popular value for Jewish cosmology, but depending on the text, the number ranged from 3 to 365.

== Origins ==
The notion or belief in a cosmos structured or tiered into seven heavens likely originates or derives from the seven visible heavenly bodies (Mercury, Venus, Mars, Jupiter, Saturn, the Moon, and the Sun).

== Ancient Near Eastern cosmology ==
The concept of seven heavens as developed in ancient Mesopotamia where it took on a symbolic or magical meaning as opposed to a literal one. In the Sumerian language, the words for heavens (or sky) and Earth are An and Ki. The ancient Mesopotamians regarded the sky as a series of domes, usually three, but sometimes seven, covering the flat Earth.

Each dome was made of a different kind of precious stone. The lowest dome of the heavens was made of jasper and was the home of the stars. The middle dome of heaven was made of saggilmut stone and was the abode of the Igigi. The highest and outermost dome of the heavens was made of luludānītu stone and was personified as An, the god of the sky.

The celestial bodies were equated with specific deities. The planet Venus was believed to be Inanna, the goddess of love, sex, and war. The Sun was her brother Utu, the god of justice, and the Moon was their father Nanna.

Ordinary mortals could not go to the heavens because it was the abode of the gods alone. Instead, after a person died, his or her soul went to Kur (later known as Irkalla), a dark shadowy underworld, located deep below the surface of the Earth. Sumerian incantations of the late second millennium BCE make references to seven heavens and seven earths. One such incantation is: "an-imin-bi ki-imin-bi" (the heavens are seven, the earths are seven.)

The understanding that the heavens can influence things on Earth lent heavenly, magical properties to the number seven itself, as in stories of seven demons, seven churches, seven spirits, or seven thrones. The number seven appears frequently in Babylonian magical rituals. The seven Jewish and the seven Islamic heavens may have had their origin in Babylonian astronomy.

In general, the heavens is not a place for humans in Mesopotamian religion. As Gilgamesh says to his friend Enkidu, in the Epic of Gilgamesh: "Who can go up to the heavens, my friend? Only the gods dwell with Shamash forever". Along with the idea of seven heavens, the idea of three heavens was also common in ancient Mesopotamia.

== Religious cosmologies ==
=== Judaism ===
==== Second Temple Judaism ====
The Second Book of Enoch, also written in the first century CE, describes the mystical ascent of the patriarch Enoch through a hierarchy of Ten Heavens. Enoch passes through the Garden of Eden in the Third Heaven on his way to meet the Lord face-to-face in the Tenth (chapter 22). Along the way, he encounters vividly described populations of angels who torment wrongdoers; he sees homes, olive oil, and flowers.

Sefer HaRazim, written in the fourth century CE, describes the seven heavens and the angels residing there.

==== Talmud ====
In the Talmud, it is suggested that the upper part of the universe is made up of seven heavens (Hebrew: shamayim):

1. Vilon (וילון), see (Isa 40:22)
2. Raki'a (רקיע), see (Gen 1:17)
3. Shehaqim (שחקים), see (Ps 78:23, Midr. Teh. to Ps. xix. 7)
4. Zebul (זבול), see (Isa 63:15, 1 Kings 8:13)
5. Ma'on (מעון), see (Deut 26:15, Ps 42:9)
6. Machon (מכון), see (1 Kings 8:39, Deut 28:12)
7. Araboth (ערבות), The seventh Heaven where ophanim, the seraphim, and the hayyoth and the Throne of God are located.

=== Christianity ===
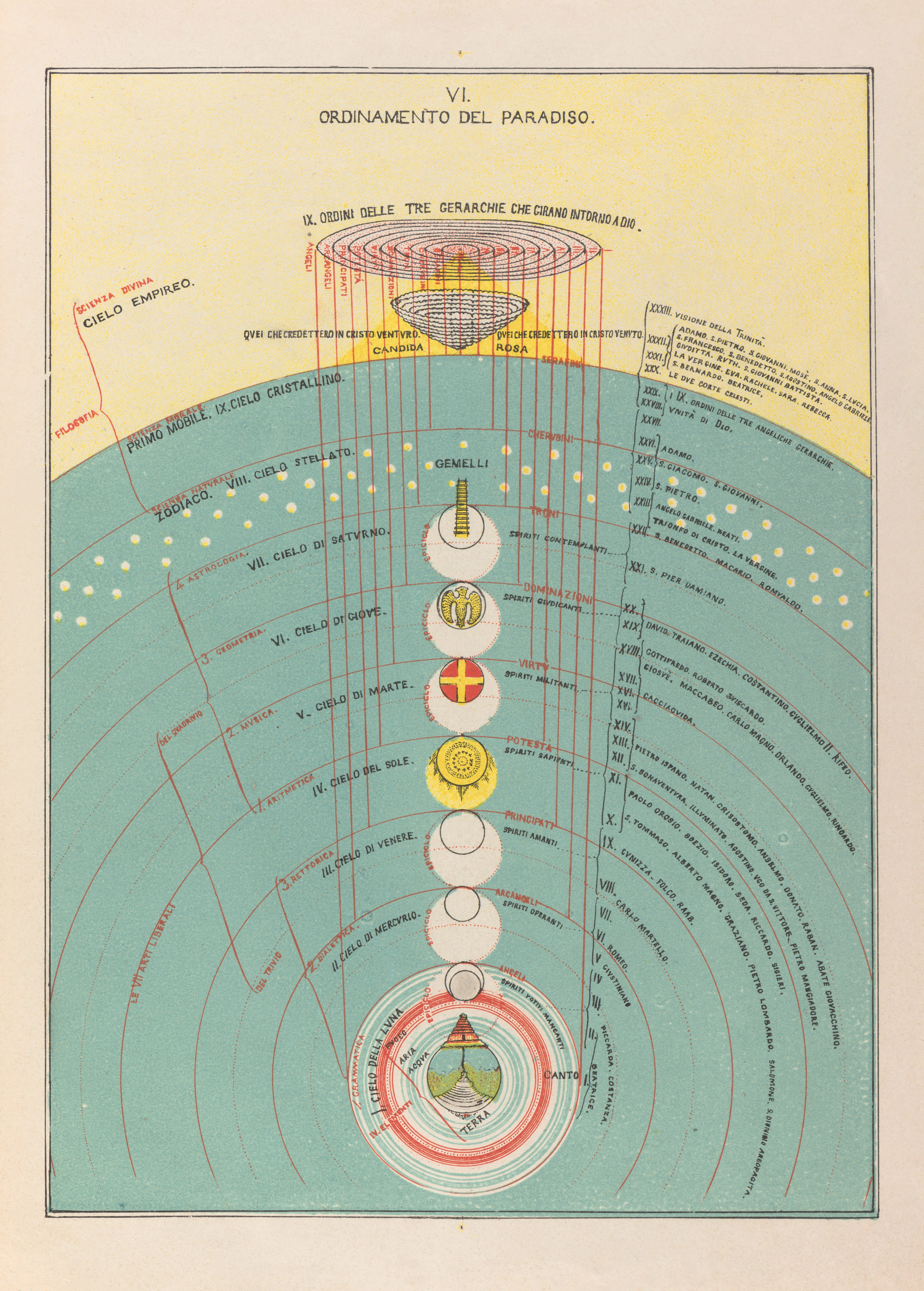
La materia della Divina commedia di Dante Alighieri, Plate VI: "The Ordering of Paradise" by Michelangelo Caetani (1804–1882)

The New Testament does not refer to the seven heavens. A person being taken up in a vision to a "third heaven" is mentioned in Paul the Apostle's Second Epistle to the Corinthians (2 Corinthians 12:2–4). The description is usually taken as an oblique reference by the author to himself.

Some Christian authors would go on to mention the seven heavens, such as the second century bishop Irenaeus (Demonstration of Apostolic Preaching 9; cf. Against Heresies 1.5.2). A variant ten-tier heaven obtained some popularity among the Scholastics during the Middle Ages, reaching its most well-known expression in The Divine Comedy by Dante Alighieri. The idea of seven heavens is carried over into the esoteric Christian cabala.

==== Gnosticism ====
The Gnostic text On the Origin of the World states that seven heavens were created in Chaos by Yaldabaoth below the higher realms, and each of them are ruled over by an Archon. During the end times, these heavens will collapse on each and the heaven of Yaldabaoth will split in two, causing its stars to fall upon the Earth, therefore causing it to sink into the Abyss.

In the Coptic Apocalypse of Paul, the apostle Paul ascends through the lower Seven Heavens. At the seventh heaven, he meets an old man who opens the gate to the realm beyond the material universe, and Paul then ascends to the eighth, ninth, and tenth heavens.

=== Islam ===
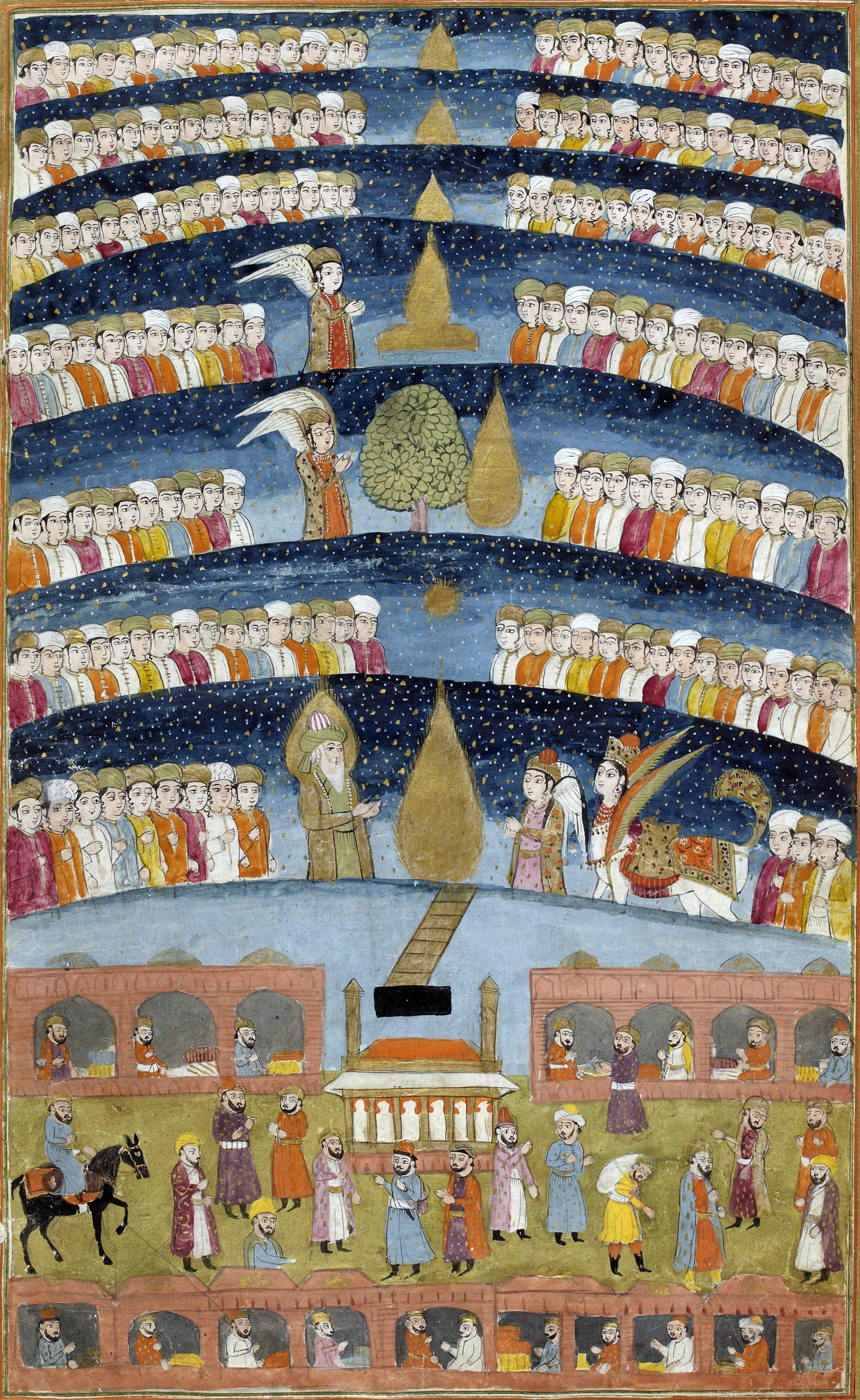
An Islamic miniature depicting Muhammad's visit to one of the Seven Heavens

The Quran and Hadith frequently mention the existence of seven samāwāt (سماوات), the plural of samāʾ (سماء), meaning 'heaven, sky, celestial sphere', and cognate with Hebrew shamāyim (שמים). Some of the verses in the Quran mentioning the samāwāt are Q41:12, Q65:12 and Q71:15. The seven heavens are not final destinations for the dead after the Day of Judgment, but regions distinct from the earth, guarded by angels and inhabited by souls whose abode depends on their good deeds (fasting, jihad, Hajj, charity), with the highest layer, the closest to God. According to Quran and Hadiths, each of the skies has its own Qibla or a structure which became direction of prayer, similar to Kaaba of the mortal world, where the Qibla of highest heaven is called Bayt al-Ma'mur, while the Qibla building for the lowest sky is called Bayt al-Izza.

In other sources, the concept is presented in metaphorical terms. Each of the seven heavens is depicted as being composed of a different material, and Islamic prophets are resident in each. The names are taken from Suyuti's Al-Hay’a as-samya fi l-hay’a as-sunmya:

1. Raqi'a (رقيعاء): The first heaven is described as being made of water and is the home of Adam and Eve, as well as the angels of each star. According to some narratives, Muhammad encountered the angel Habib here.
2. Araqlun (أرفلون): The second heaven is described as being made of white pearls and is the home of Yahya (John the Baptist) and Isa (Jesus).
3. Qaydum (قيدوم): The third heaven is described as being made of iron (alternatively pearls or other dazzling stones); Joseph and the Angel of Death (named Azrael) are resident there.
4. Maʿuna (ماعونا): The fourth heaven is described as being made of brass (alternatively white gold); Idris (conventionally identified with Enoch) and the "Angel of Tears" reside there.
5. Di'a (ريقا): The fifth heaven is described as being made of silver; Aaron holds court over this heaven. Sometimes, the guardian of hellfire is assigned to this place.
6. Daqua (دقناء): The sixth heaven is described as being composed of gold (alternatively garnets and rubies); Moses can be found here.
7. ʿAriba (عريبا): The seventh heaven, which borrows some concepts from its Jewish counterpart, is depicted as being composed of divine light incomprehensible to the mortal man (alternatively emerald). Abraham is a resident there and Sidrat al-Muntaha, a large enigmatic Lote tree, marks the end of the seventh heaven and the utmost extremity for all of God's creatures and heavenly knowledge.

There are two interpretations of using the number "seven". One viewpoint is that the number "seven" here simply means "many" and is not to be taken literally (the number is often used to imply that in the Arabic language).

One modern interpretation of "heavens" is that all the stars and galaxies (including the Milky Way) are all part of the "first heaven", and "beyond that six still bigger worlds are there," which have yet to be discovered by scientists.

=== Hinduism ===
According to all Puranas, the Brahmanda is divided into fourteen worlds known as lokas. Seven are upper worlds: Bhuloka (the Earth and sky), Bhuvarloka, Svargaloka, Maharloka, Janarloka, Tapaloka and Satyaloka; and seven are lower worlds: Atala, Vitala, Sutala, Talatala, Mahatala, Rasatala and Patala.

=== Mandaeism ===
In Mandaeism, a series of maṭartas, or "toll houses", are located between the World of Light (alma ḏ-nhūra) from Tibil (Earth). The term maṭarta has variously been translated as "watch-station", "toll-station", "way-station", or "purgatory". Maṭartas are guarded by various uthras (celestial beings from the World of Light) and demons. In the Ginza Rabba, seven maṭartas are listed and described in Chapter 3 in Book 5 of the Right Ginza.

However, the number of maṭartas is not always seven. Book 6 of the Right Ginza (also known as the "Book of Dinanukht") lists six. Chapter 4 in Book 1 of the Left Ginza lists eight. Alternatively, the Seven Heavens can also be seen as corresponding to the Seven Planets, who form part of the entourage of Ruha in the World of Darkness.

== See also ==
- As above, so below – Popular Neo-Hermetic maxim
- Astral religion – Worship of stars and other heavenly bodies as deities
- Empyrean – Highest heaven in ancient cosmologies
- Hierarchy of angels – Belief that angels are ordered according to rank
- Isra and Mi'raj – Journey by Muhammad in Islamic tradition
- Katabasis – Journey into the underworld in literature
- Naraka – Hell in Indian religions
- Ogdoad – Gnostic cosmology of eight heavens
