= At-Talaq =

65th chapter of the Qur'an

Surah 65 of the Quran
الطلاق Aṭ-Ṭalāq The Divorce
- Qira'ah; English text
- Classification: Medinan
- Position: Juzʼ 28
- No. of verses: 12
- No. of Rukus: 2

At-Talaq
Recitation of At-Talaq in mujawwad.

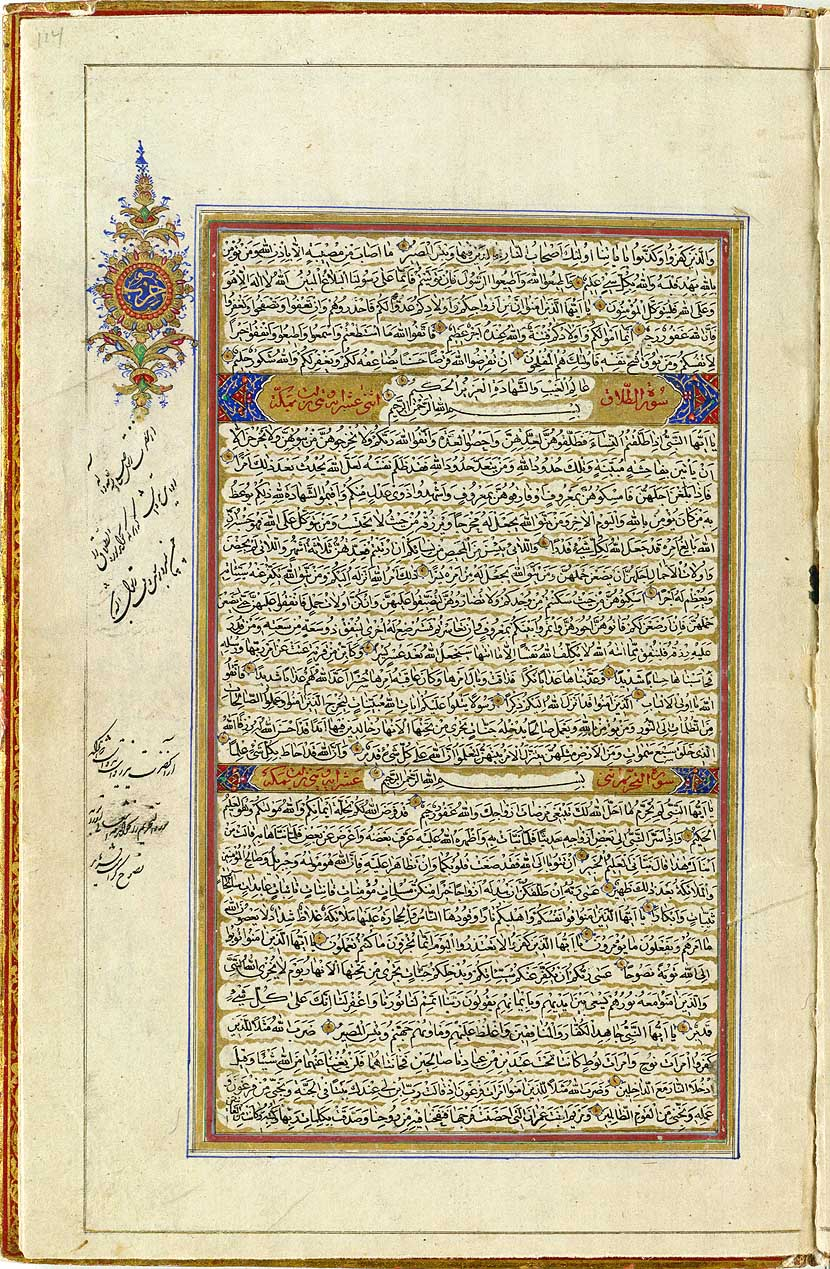
Page from an 1874 Qur'an; sura At-Talaq is in the middle of the page

"Divorce" (Arabic: الطلاق, aṭ-talāq) is the 65th chapter of the Qur'an with 12 verses (ayat). The main subject is about divorce. Abdullah ibn Masud reportedly described it as the shorter version of the surah An-Nisa.

After addressing the topic of divorce and a number of other resulting family issues in first 7 verses, the surah then strongly urges people to observe God’s regulations and guidance, and reminded the fate of earlier disobedient people that the apostate and disobedient were chastised for their sin. The 11th verse describes the required attitude of the true believers that they exhort to faith in messenger and the regarding bounties. Finally God’s power and knowledge are emphasized at the end.

== Summary ==
1-7 Certain limitations to the law of divorce
8-10 The apostate and disobedient chastised for their sin
11 True believers exhorted to faith in Muhammad
12 God hath created the seven heavens

== Hadith ==
It is narrated from Imam Jafar Sadiq that: “Whoever recites Surah Talaq and Surah Tahrim in the obligatory prayer, God will protect him from the fear of the Day of Judgment and save him from Hell and through reciting and continuing to read these two Surahs, Allah will admit him to Paradise; because these two Surahs are related to the Prophet”

== See also ==
- Divorce in Islam
- Iddah
