= Throne of God =

Reigning center of God in the Abrahamic religions

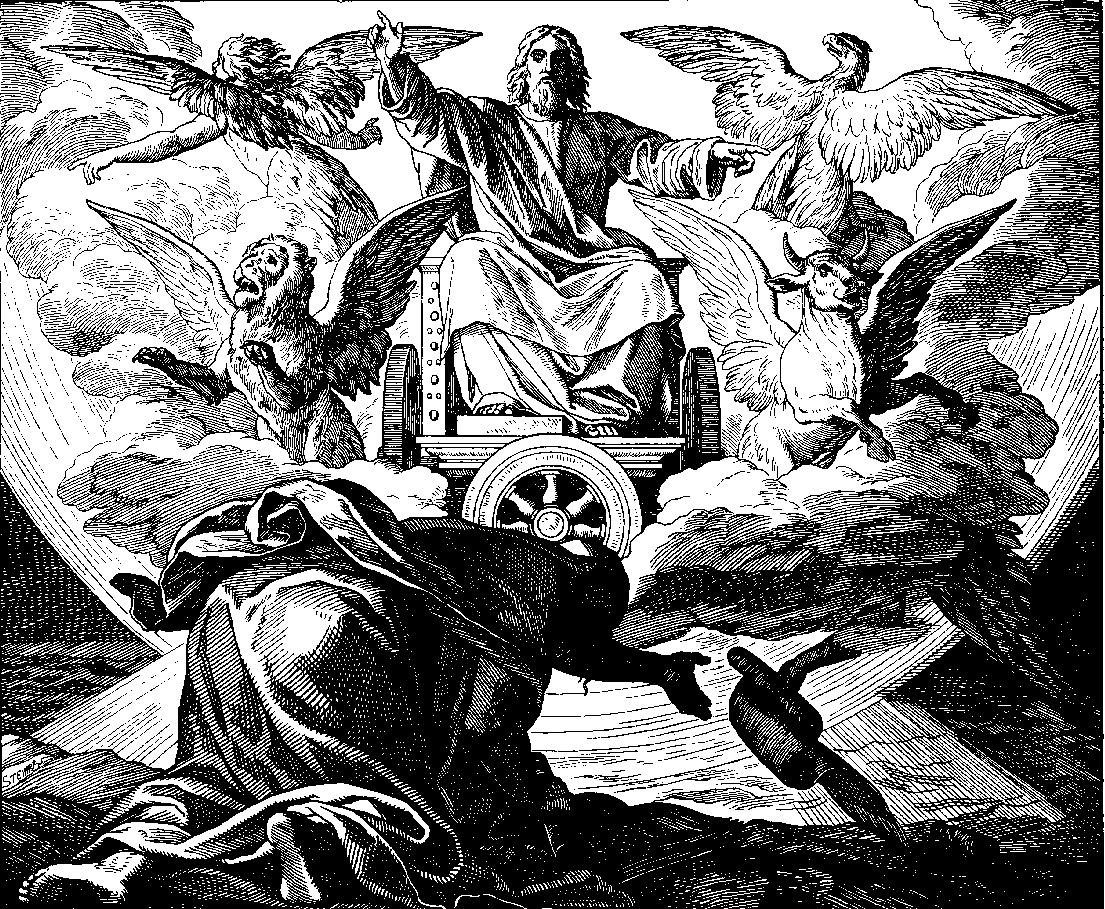
Ezekiel's vision is depicted in this 1860 woodcut by Julius Schnorr von Karolsfeld.

The throne of God is the reigning centre of God in the Abrahamic religions: primarily Judaism, Christianity, and Islam. The throne is said by various holy books to reside beyond the Seventh Heaven which is called Araboth (Hebrew: עֲרָבוֹת ‘ărāḇōṯ) in Judaism.

== Judaism ==
Micaiah (1 Kings 22:19), Isaiah (Isaiah 6), Ezekiel (Ezekiel 1) and Daniel (Daniel 7:9) all speak of God's throne, although some philosophers, such as Saʿadiah Gaon and Maimonides, interpreted such mention of a "throne" as allegory.

The heavenly throne room or throne room of God is a more detailed presentation of the throne, into the representation of throne room or divine court.

=== Micaiah's throne room vision ===
Micaiah's extended prophecy (1 Kings 22:19) is the first detailed depiction of a heavenly throne room in Judaism.

=== Zechariah's throne room vision ===
Zechariah 3 depicts a vision of the heavenly throne room where Satan and the Angel of the Lord contend over Joshua the High Priest in the time of his grandson Eliashib the High Priest. Many Christians consider this a literal event, others such as Goulder (1998) view the vision as symbolic of crisis on earth, such as opposition from Sanballat the Horonite.

=== Isaiah ===
In Isaiah 6, Isaiah sees the Lord sitting upon a throne, high and lifted up, and his train (robe) filled the temple. Above the throne stood the Seraphim (angelic beings), and each one had 6 wings. With two wings they covered their faces, with two they covered their feet, and with two they flew. And the Seraphim were calling out to one another, "Holy, Holy, Holy, is the Lord of Hosts" (Some translations title it, 'Lord of heavens armies', or 'Lord Almighty'). Their voices shook the temple to its foundations, and the entire building was filled with smoke.

=== Wisdom of Solomon ===
In the apocryphal Book of Wisdom, the prayer offered by Solomon asking God for wisdom calls for him to be "sent from the throne of your glory".

=== Dead Sea Scrolls ===
The concept of a heavenly throne occurs in three Dead Sea Scroll texts. Later speculation on the throne of God became a theme of Merkabah mysticism.

== Christianity ==
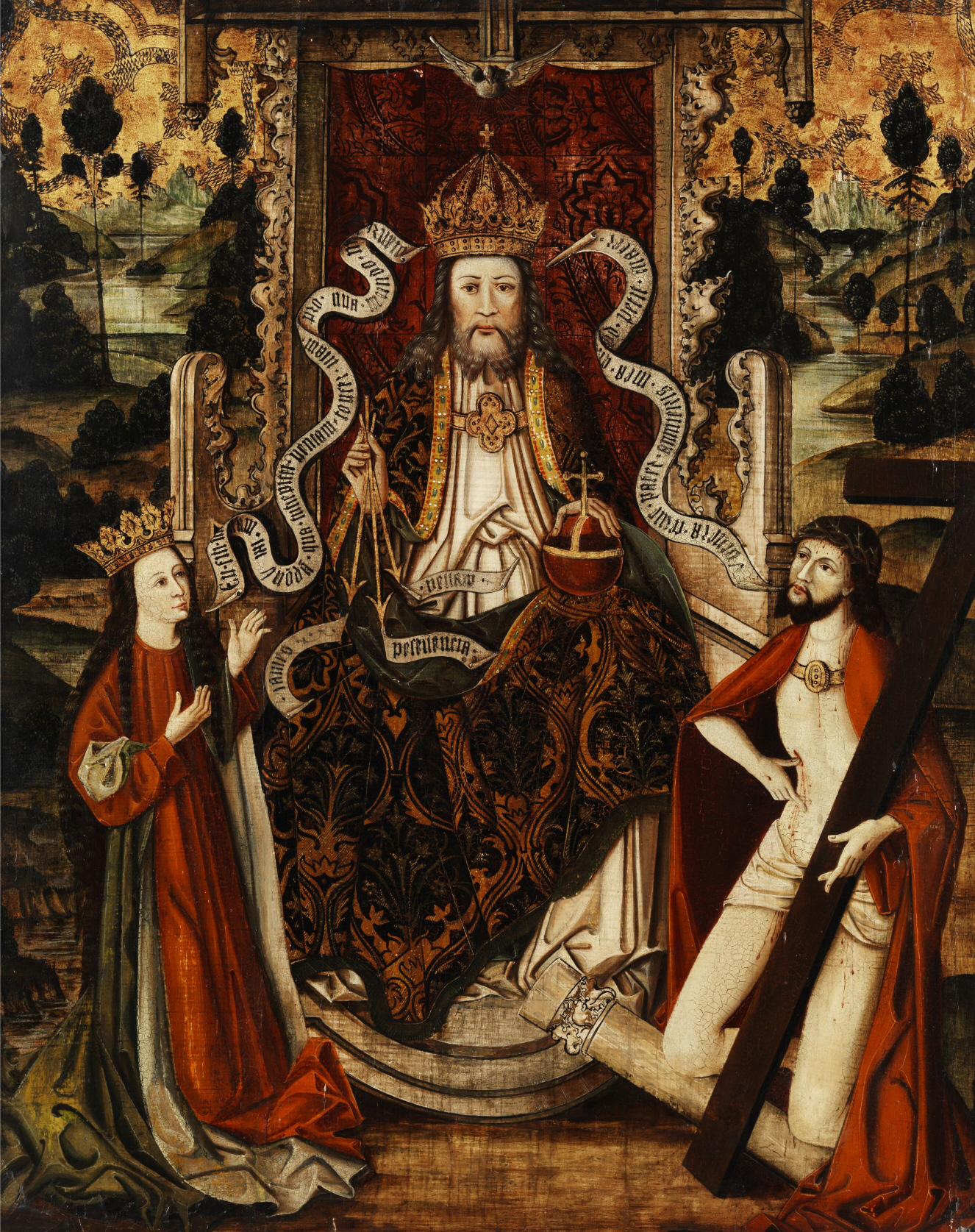
God the Father on a throne, Westphalia, Germany, late 15th century.

In the New Testament, the Throne of God (Ancient Greek: ὁ θρόνος τοῦ θεοῦ, romanized: ho thronos tou Theou) is talked about in several forms, including Heaven as the Throne of God, the Throne of David, the Throne of Glory, the Throne of Grace and many more. The idea of the Throne of Grace is a new theme throughout the Christian Bible. This was not as heavily expounded on in the Old Testament because the Christian Savior Jesus Christ had not yet made propitiation for the sins of mankind. The book of Hebrews contains a great example of this in saying "let us then with confidence draw near to the throne of grace, that we may receive mercy and find grace to help us in our time of need" (Hebrews 4:16). This access to the Throne of God was not so easily available to the Jewish. The New Testament continues Jewish identification of heaven itself as the "throne of God", but also locates the throne of God as "in heaven" and having a secondary seat at the right hand of God for the Session of Christ.

=== Revelation ===
The Book of Revelation describes the Seven Spirits of God which surround the throne, and its author wishes his readers in the Seven Asian churches to be blessed with grace from God, from the seven who are before God's throne, and from Jesus Christ in Heaven. He states that in front of the throne there appears to be "a sea of glass, clear as crystal", and that the throne is surrounded by a lion, an ox, a man, and a flying eagle; each with six wings and covered with eyes, who constantly cry "Holy, holy, holy is the Lord God Almighty, who was, and is, and is to come" repeatedly. It is also said that "out of the throne proceeded lightnings and thunderings and voices". In the vision of Revelation 7:9-17 a great multitude stands “before the throne and before the Lamb” (7:9, 15) and cries out, “Salvation belongs to our God who sits on the throne, and to the Lamb!” (7:10).

== Islam ==
According to the British academic, Islam Issa, in Islamic theology, it is the largest of creations. Most Sunnis (Ash'aris, Maturidis, and Sufis), Mu'tazilis, and Shi'is (Twelvers and Isma'ilis) believe the Throne (Arabic: العرش al-'Arsh) is a symbol of God's power and authority and not as a dwelling place for Himself while Atharis believe that God has created it as a sign of his Kingdom . The Quran depicts the angels as carrying the throne of God and praising his glory, similar to Old Testament images. The Ayat al-Kursi (often glossed as "Verse of the footstool") is a verse from Al-Baqara, the second sura of the Quran.

== See also ==
- Hlidskjalf (throne of Odin)
- Kolob
- Concepts, symbolism, and interpretations of the Taj Mahal
- Shesha – similar concept in Hinduism

== Bibliography ==
Notes

References

- Arnold, Edwin (1998). Pearls of the Faith (1998 ed.). Kessinger Publishing. ISBN 0-7661-0243-2. – Total pages: 340
- Bowker, John (2005). The concise Oxford dictionary of world religions (2005 ed.). Oxford University Press. ISBN 0-19-861053-X. – Total pages: 702
- Kittel, Gerhard (1966). Theological Dictionary of the New Testament, Volumes 3-4 (1966 ed.). Wm. B. Eerdmans Publishing. ISBN 0-8028-2245-2. – Total pages: 1116
- O'Shaughnessy, Thomas J. (December 1973). "God's Throne and the Biblical Symbolism of the Qur'ān". Numen. 20 (3). BRILL: 202–221. doi:10.1163/156852773x00376. JSTOR 3269642.
- Pickthalll, Marmaduke; Hanauer, James Edward (1935). Folk-lore of the Holy Land: Moslem, Christian and Jewish (1935 ed.). Forgotten Books. ISBN 1-60506-065-8. – Total pages: 280
