= Basuki Nath Mahadev Mandir =

Shiva temple in Mithila

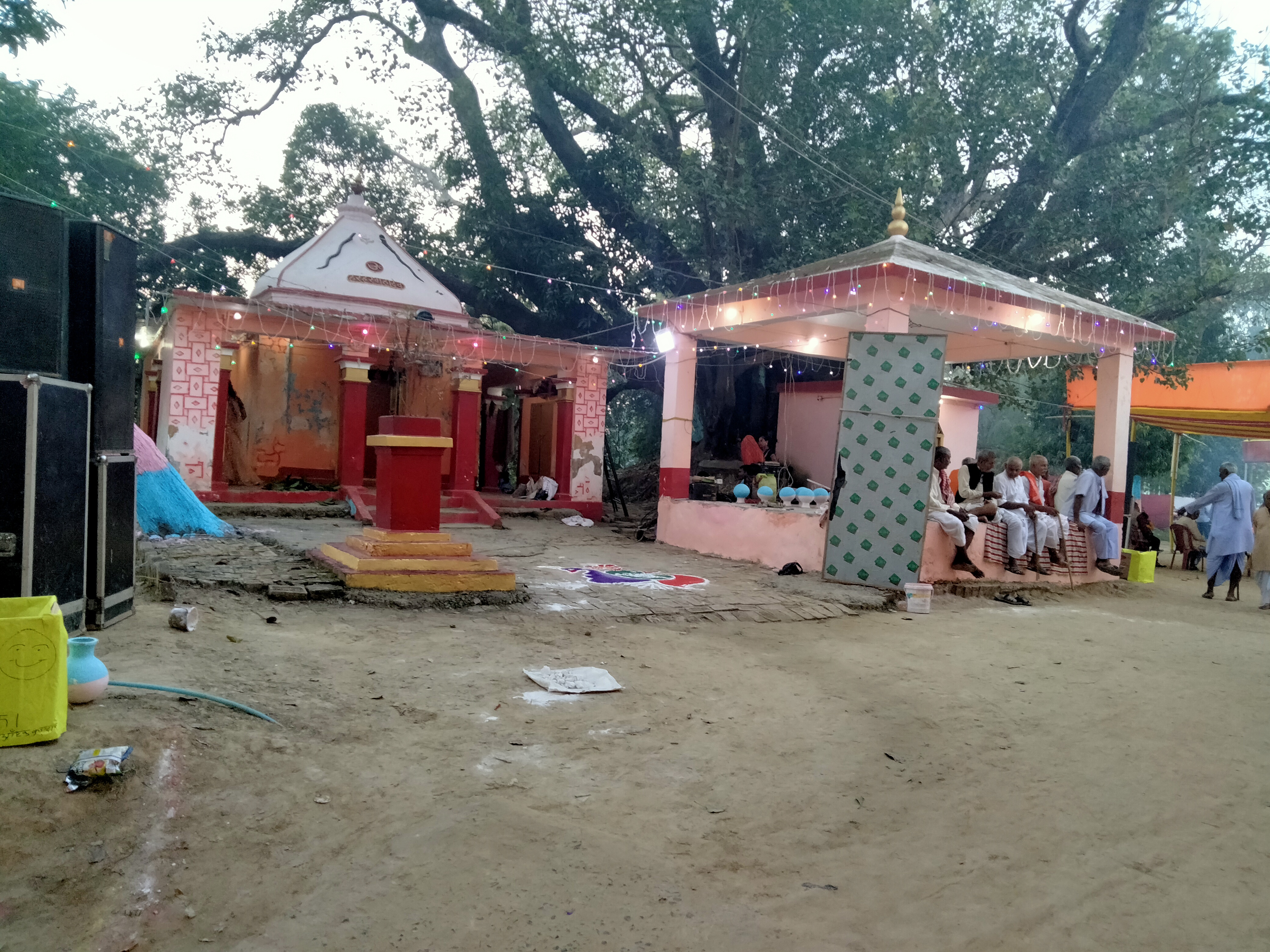
- Basuki Nath Mahadev Mandir during the celebration of Chhath festival on the bank of Chaudhary Pokhair.

Religion
- Affiliation: Hinduism
- District: Madhubani district
- Deity: Shiva
- Festivals: Mahashivratri, Chhath
- Features: Temple tree: Pipal

Location
- Location: Chaudhary Pokhair, Basuki Bihari North, Madhwapur Block, Mithila region
- State: Bihar
- Interactive map of Basuki Nath Mahadev Mandir
- Coordinates: 26.591068°N 85.838179°E

Architecture
- Founder: Chaudhary Family

Basuki Nath Mahadev Mandir is a Hindu temple of Shiva located in Basuki Bihari North, a part of Basuki Bihari village in the Madhubani district of Bihar, India. It is one of the oldest temples in the area and was built by the Chaudhary family, who were Maithil Brahmins and very devoted to Shiva. The exact date of foundation of the temple is unknown, but it is believed to be more than 150 years old. The temple is also known as Baba Basuki Nath Mahadev Mandir and has a Pipal tree north to it that is also very old.

View of the Baba Basuki Nath Mahadev Shivalinga at the Garbhgriha of the temple. A Maithil Brahmin woman is worshiping the Shivalinga on the occasion of Mundan ceremony of her child.

== Description ==
The temple is a place of pilgrimage for Hindus and attracts many devotees from nearby villages and towns. The temple is open from 6 am to 8 pm every day and has a daily aarti (prayer) at 7 pm. The temple also celebrates various festivals like Shivaratri, Shravan, Navratri and Diwali with great fervour and devotion. The Mahashivratri festival in Hinduism is the major festival of the temple. It also organises Ashtajam Puja from time to time in the premises of the temple. During the month of Sawan, a large of number of devotees on every Monday come to perform Jalabhisheka on the Shivalinga of the temple.

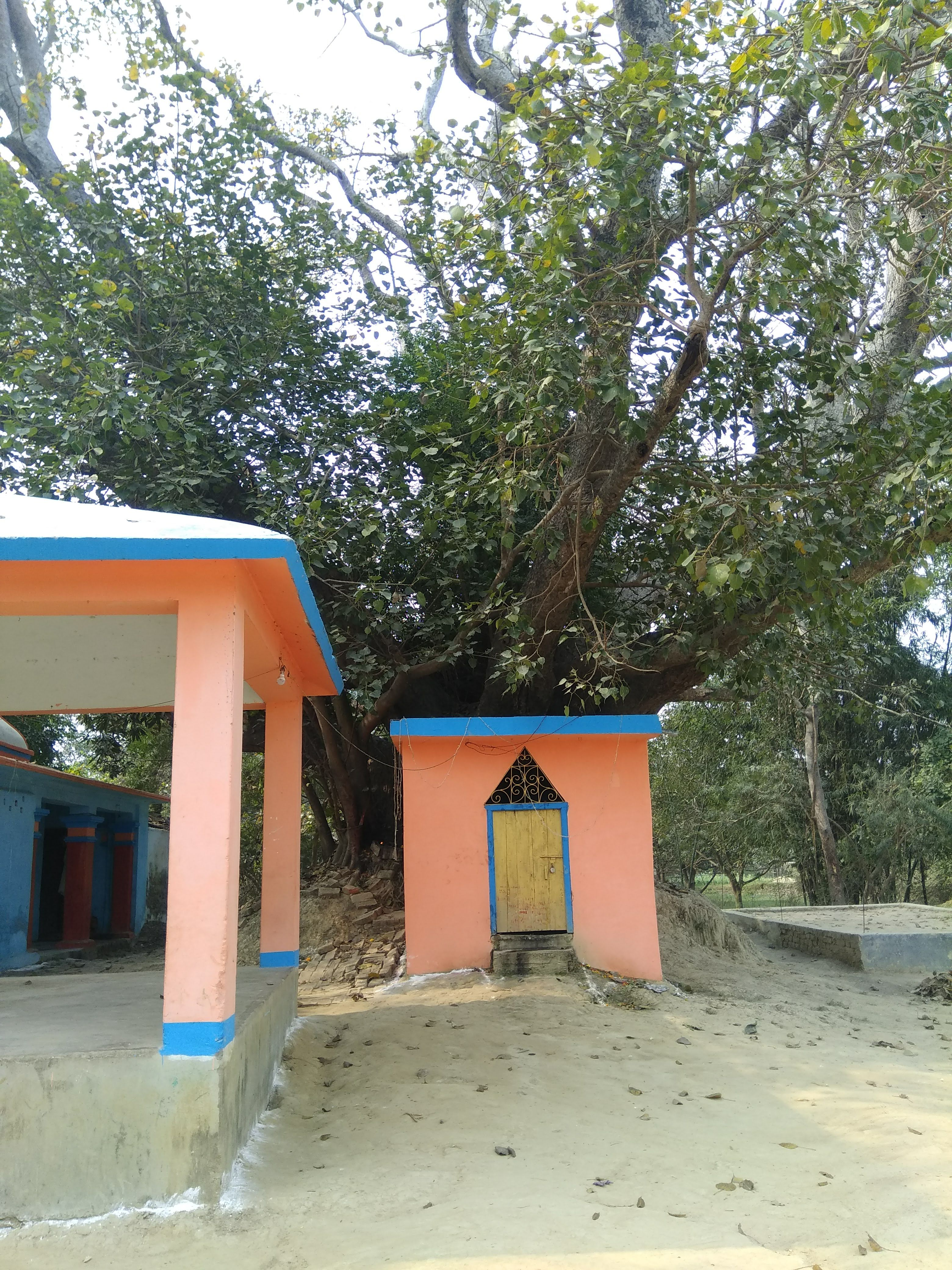
Brahm Baba Sthan in the campus of the temple

The temple is connected by State Highway No 75 from Darbhanga to Madhwapur and is only two kilometres away from the Indo-Nepal Border at Madhwapur in Madhubani district.

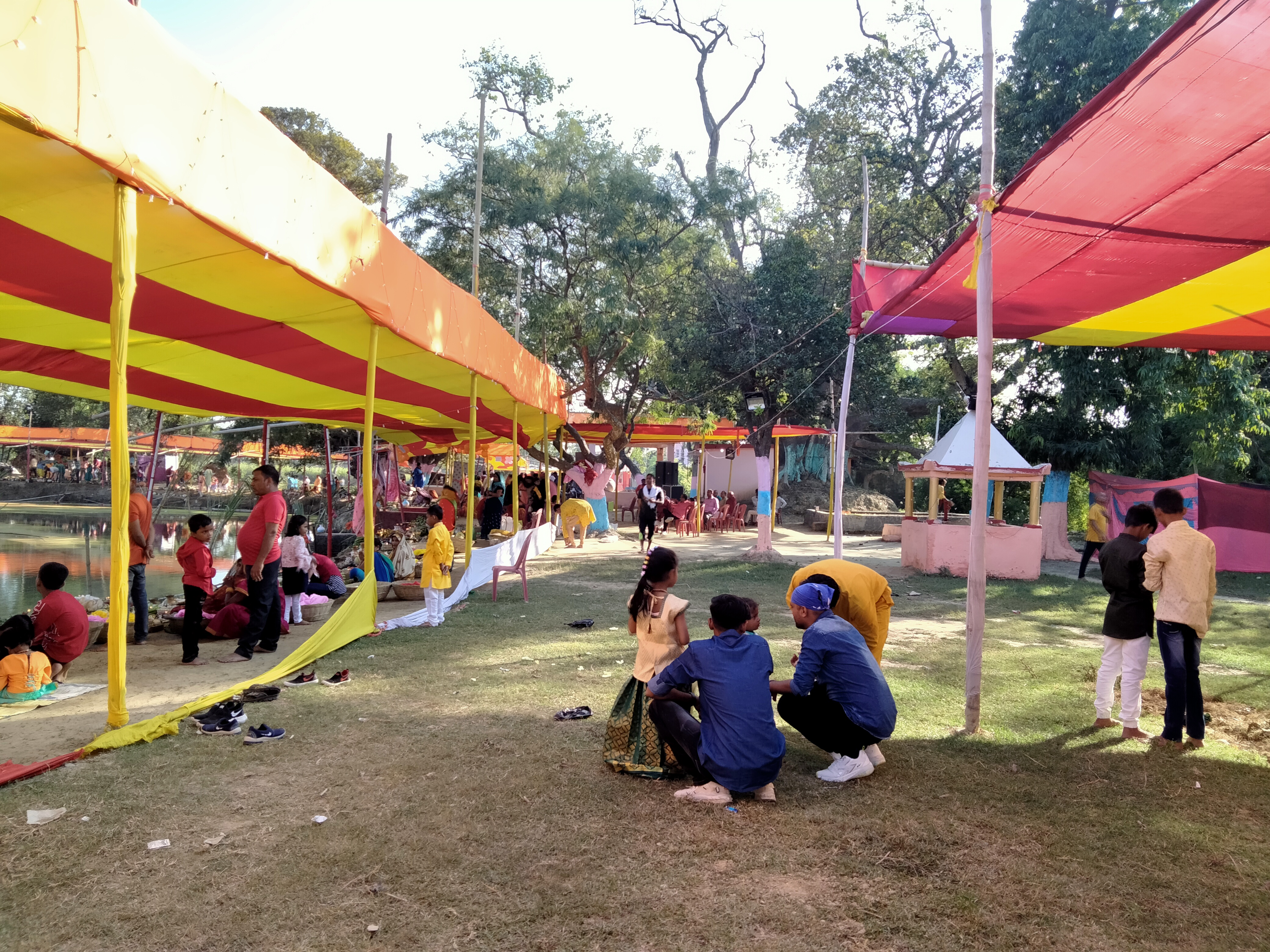
Decoration at the campus of the Basuki Nath Mahadev Mandir during Chhath festival

== Gallery ==
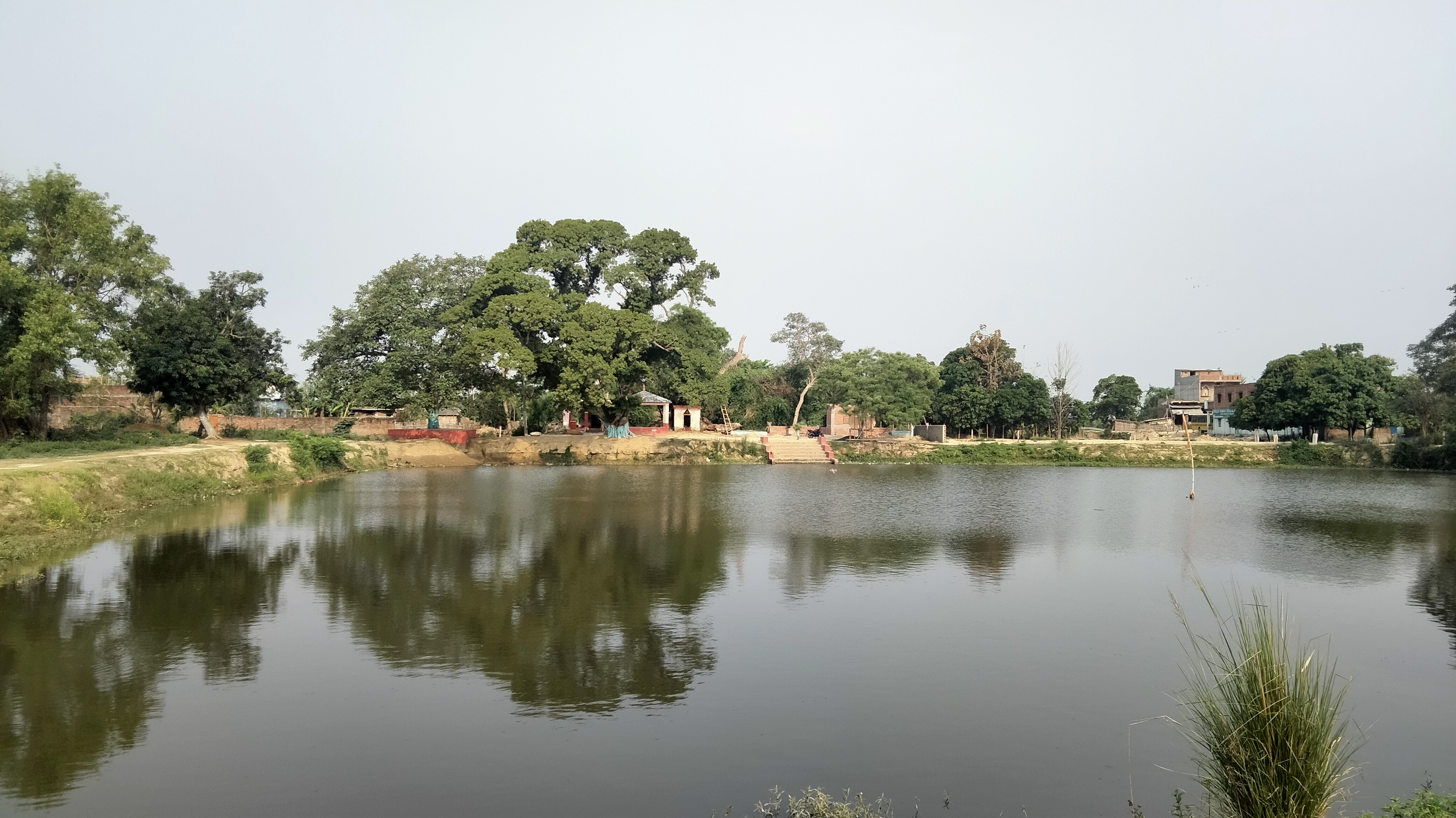
View of the temple from the east bank of the Chaudhary Pokhair

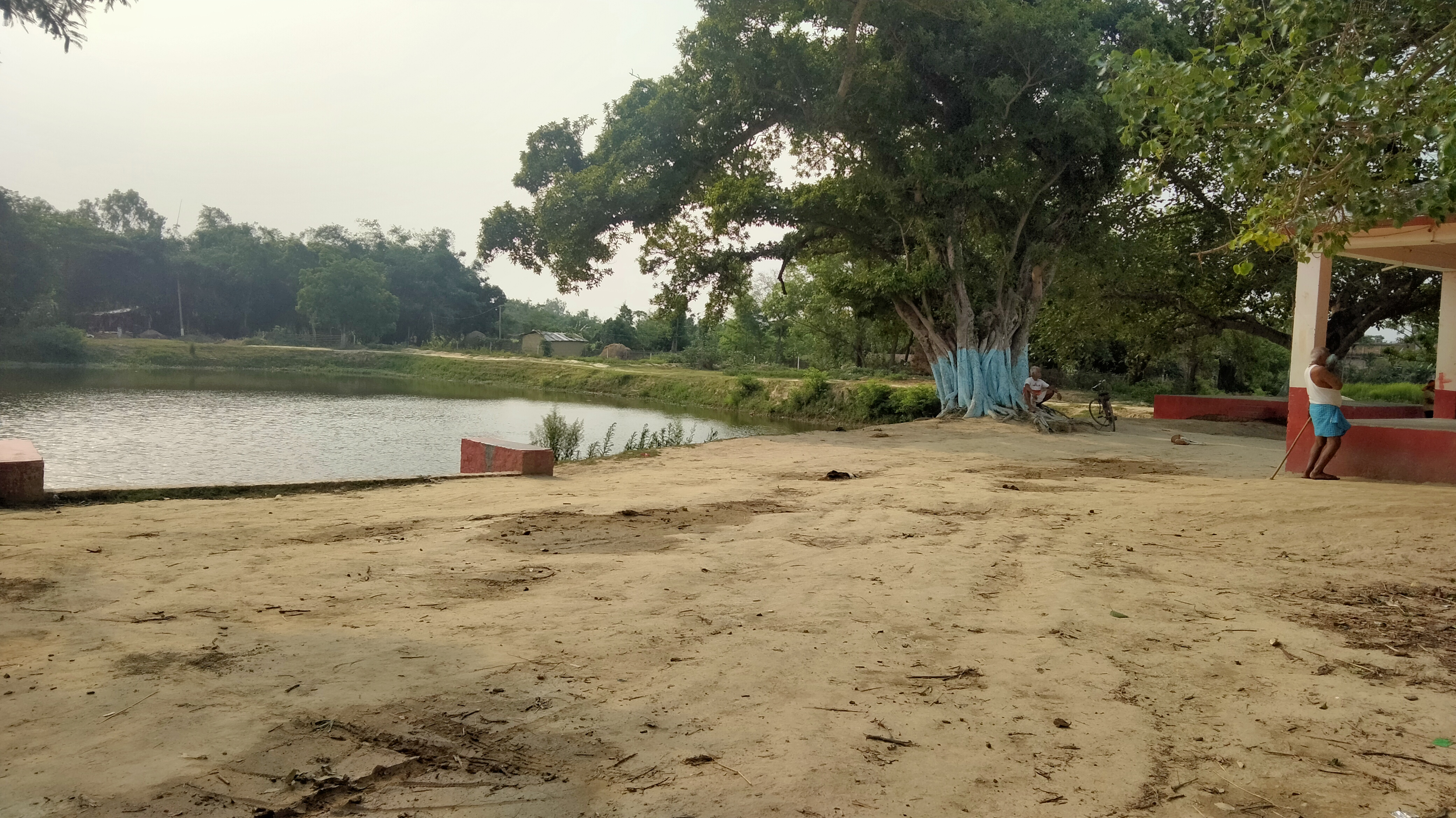
View of the campus of the temple

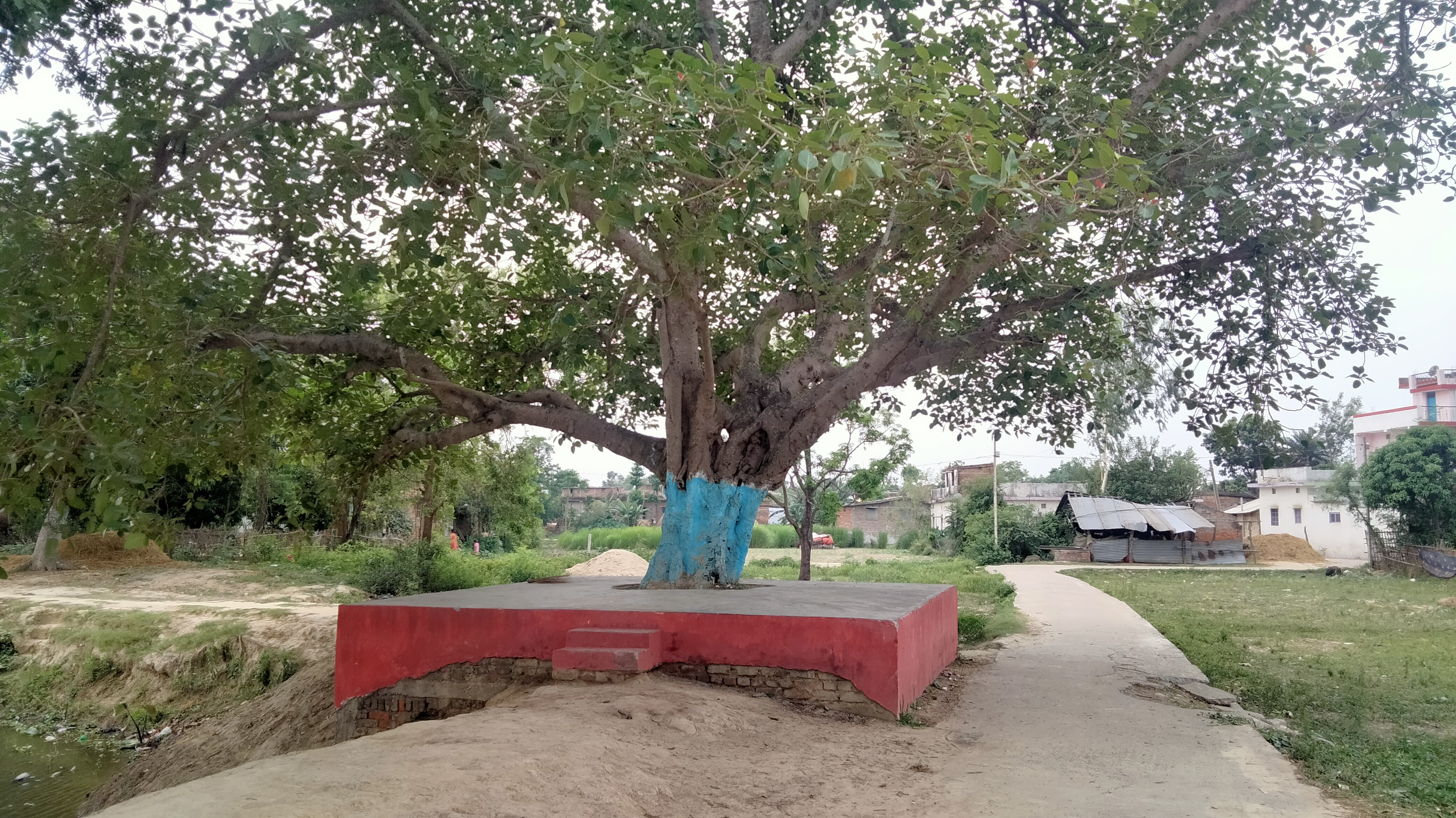
Var Gachhi (Banyan tree) in the campus

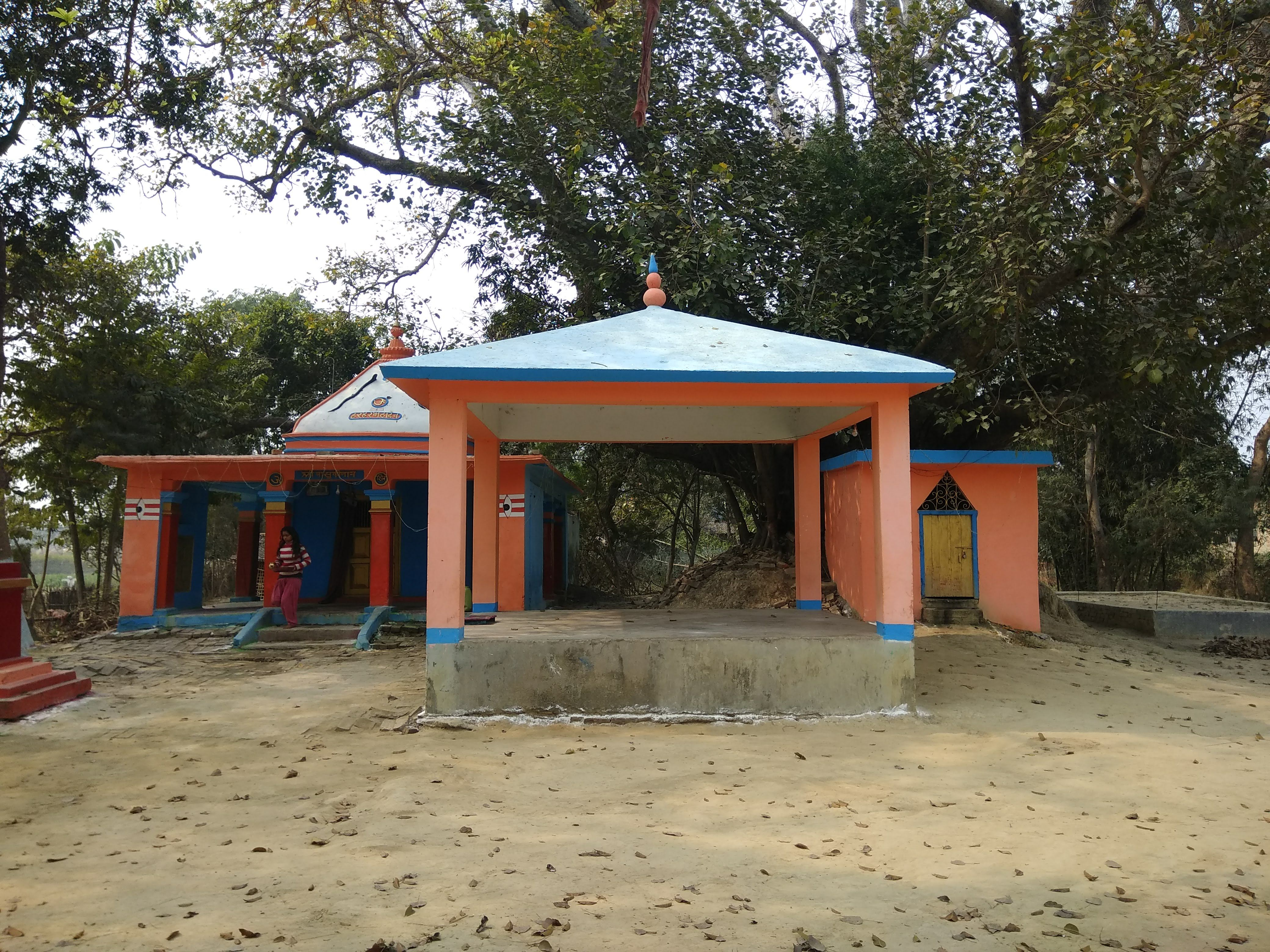
View of the temple from front side

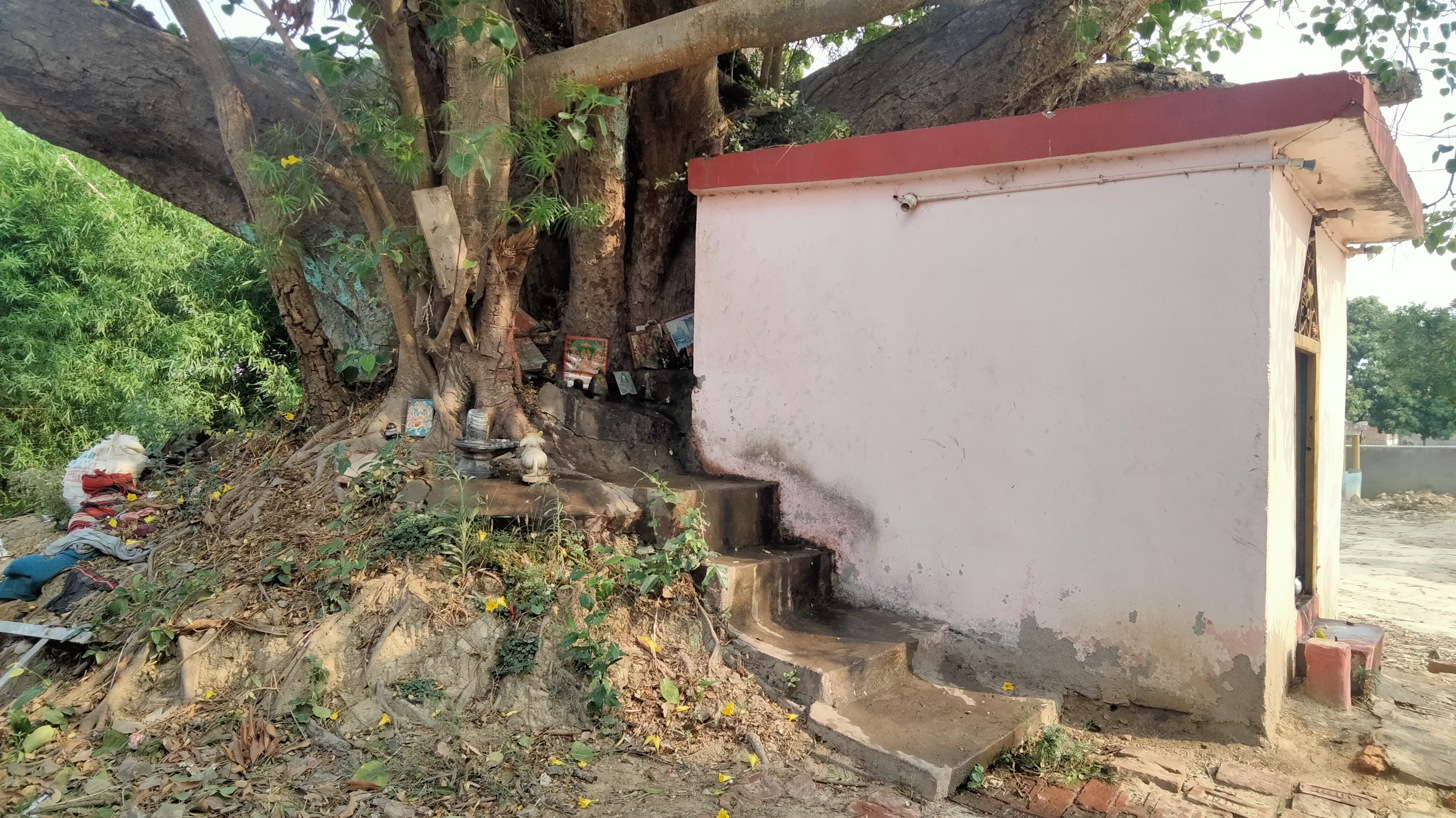
The sacred grand Pipar Gachhi (Pipal tree) in the premises

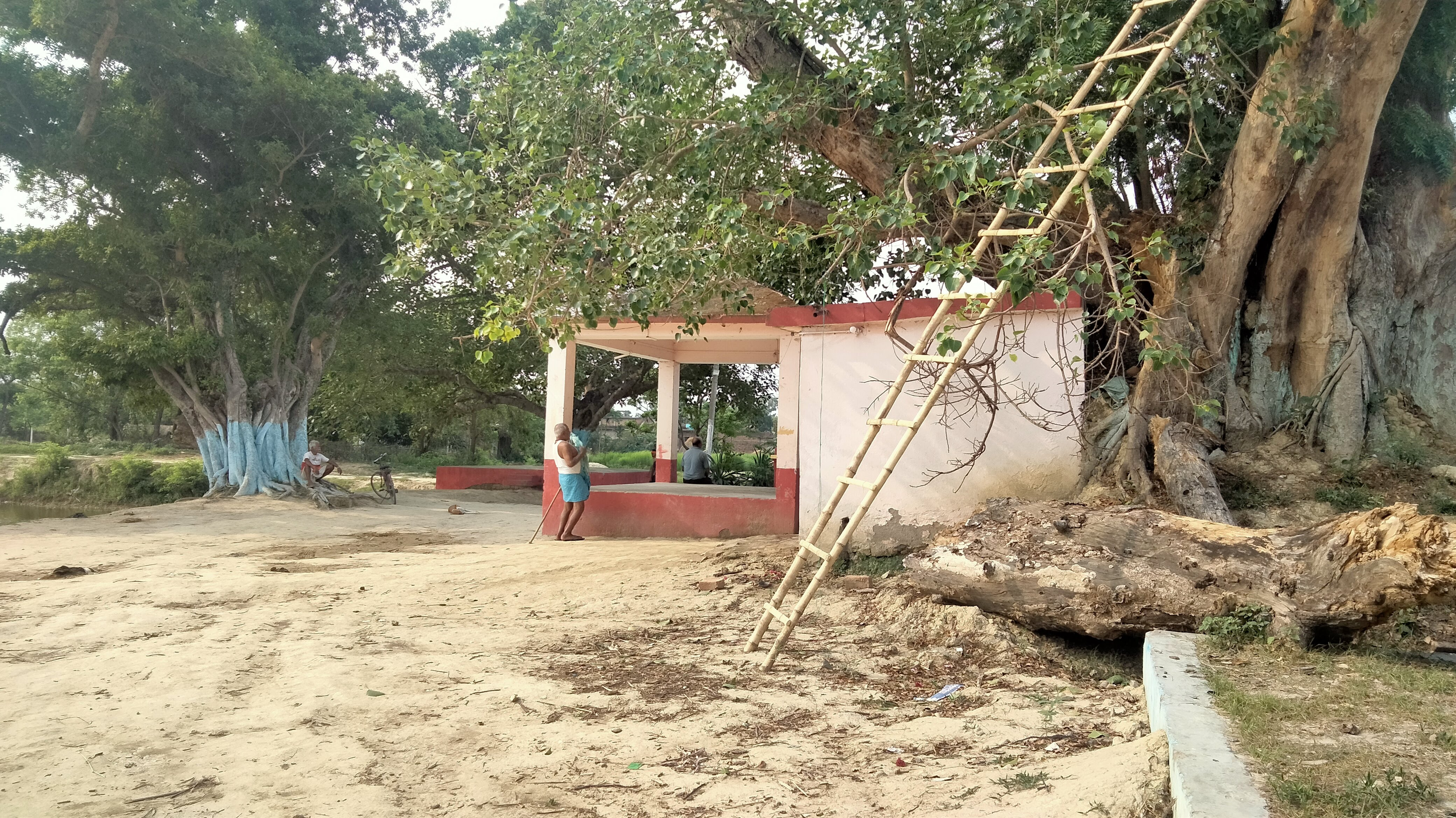
Brahma Baba Sthan Mandir in the premises.
