= Ashtajam =

Devotional practice in Hinduism

- अष्टजाम
- Type: Chanting and Kirtan
- Classification: Hinduism
- Scripture: Kali-Saṇṭāraṇa Upaniṣad
- Deity: Vishnu
- Region: Indian subcontinent
- Language: Sanskrit, Hindi, Maithili
- Possessions: Harinaam
- Founder: Chaitanya Mahaprabhu
- Members: Kirtan Bhajan Mandali
- Other names: Ashtayam; Ramdhuni Ashtajam; Harinaam Sakirtan; Maha Ashtajam; Akhand Hari Kirtan
- Slogan: Hare Krishna, Hare Rama

Ashtajam (Maithili: अष्टजाम, Sanskrit: अष्टयाम) is a devotional practice in Hinduism dedicated to Vishnu. It is a major devotional practice in the tradition of Vaishnava sect in Hinduism. During the Ashtajam Puja, devotees continuously chant Harinaam, name of Krishna and play Harinaam Kirtan for the entire 24 hours. Its customs and process of the devotional practice may varies from region to region in the Indian subcontinent. It is also known Harinaam Sakirtan or Maha Ashtajam or Akhand Hari Kirtan Ashtajam. It is also practice in the devotion of Rama which is called as Ramdhuni Ashtajam.

== Etymology ==
Ashtajam is an Indic word formed by the combination of the two Sanskrit terms Ashta and Yama.

== Description ==
In the Ashtajam Puja, the continuous chanting of Harinaam is performed by Kirtan Mandalis with their musical instruments. Several Vedic mantras dedicated to Vishnu, Krishna and Rama are also chanted during the Ashtajam Puja. There is a Mahamantra of the Ashtajam Puja which is continuously chanted for 24 hours without a stop in the chanting. The Mahamantra is

Hare Ram Hare Ram Ram Ram Hare Hare, Hare Krishna Hare Krishna Krishna Krishna Hare Hare

— Mahamantra of Ashtajam, Kali-Saṇṭāraṇa Upaniṣad

The Ashtajam is a unique tradition of praying to the Vishnu. For centuries Hindu adherents have been convinced that whatever they ask from God with a pure heart will definitely be fulfilled by performing the Ashtajam Puja. Whenever there is a shortage of rain or any natural calamity occurs in the villages of the Bengal region, Bihar or border areas in Nepal, the Hindu adherents organize group Ashtajam Puja in their villages. During the Ashtajam Puja, continuous chanting of the names of Rama and Krishna is performed, which continues until the God fulfills the wishes of the devotees.

== Origin ==
It is said that the tradition of Ashtajam is not found in the ancient Hindu texts but it was originated during mediaeval period in the subcontinent. Its history is traced back since the period of the great Vaishnava devotee Sharomani Chaitanya Mahaprabhu at Navadwip area of the Bengal region. Once upon a time in the Bengal region, the Nawab of Murshidabad announced an anti-people order. Then in response, Chaitanya Mahaprabhu started Harinaam Sankirtan with hundreds of kirtanis, against the anti-people order of the Nawab. It is said that the Nawab had to bow his head before Chaitanya's devotional fervor. After that it became a regular religious event in villages across Bengal, Bihar and the border areas in Nepal. Then on the Ashtajam Puja is being celebrated in every villages in these regions.
