= Paradise =

Place of exceptional happiness, delight, and bliss

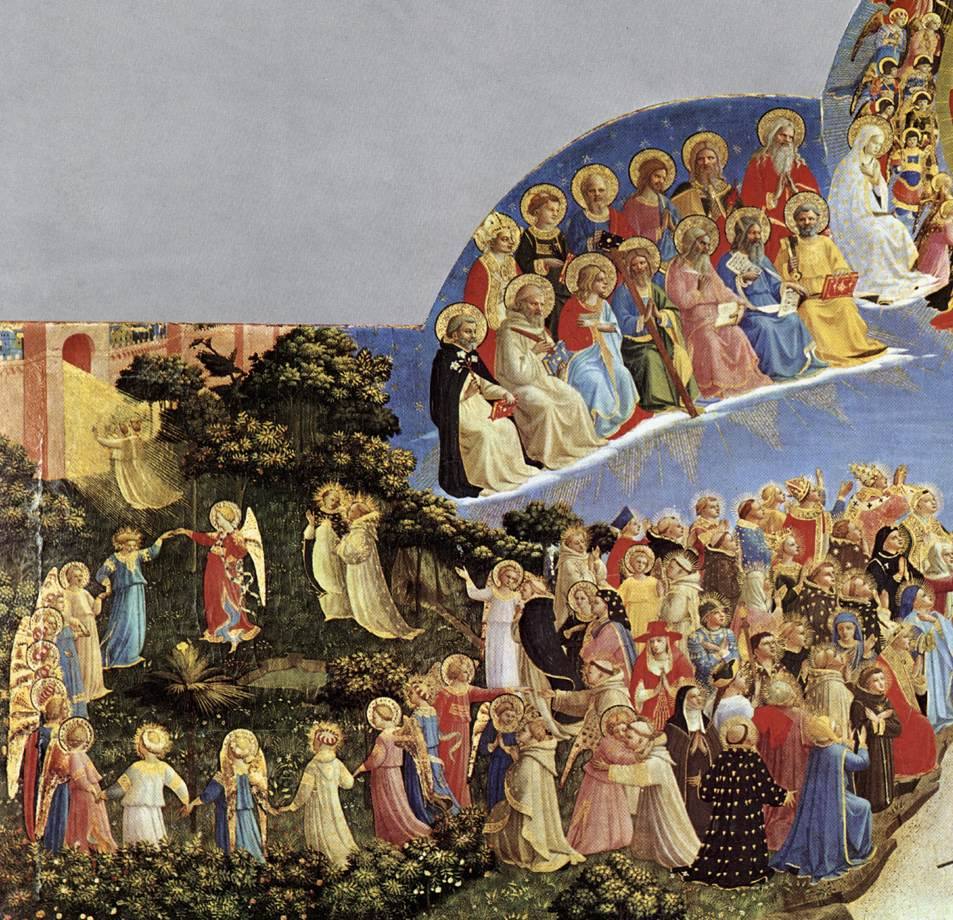
The Last Judgment (detail), c.1431, by Fra Angelico depicting people in paradise

In religion and folklore, paradise is a place of everlasting happiness, delight, and bliss. Paradisiacal notions are often laden with pastoral imagery, and may be cosmogonical, eschatological, or both, often contrasted with the miseries of human civilization: in paradise there is only peace, prosperity, and happiness. Paradise is a place of contentment, a land of luxury and fulfillment containing ever-lasting bliss and delight. Paradise is often described as a "higher place", the holiest place, in contrast to this world, or underworlds such as hell.

The use of the word 'paradise' to describe such a place originates from the Vulgate's use of the Latin word paradisus in its translation of Genesis 2:8: "And the Lord God had planted a paradise of pleasure" (Latin: "plantaverat autem Dominus Deus paradisum voluptatis"), this word in turn being borrowed from the Septuagint's use of the Greek word παράδεισος (paradeisos) meaning 'garden' or 'orchard'. Although Jerome translated from the original Hebrew, he borrowed the Greek translation's terminology, paradeisos, and added the "pleasure" qualification (voluptatis) by making explicit the word play in the original Hebrew verse: the garden is located in a place with the name Eden (עֵדֶן), from a root meaning 'pleasure' (as in עָדִין (adin) 'voluptuous').

In eschatological contexts, paradise is imagined as an abode of the virtuous dead. In Judaism, Christianity, and Islam, heaven is a paradisiacal belief. In Hinduism and Buddhism, paradise and heaven are synonymous, with higher levels available to beings who have achieved special attainments of virtue and meditation. In old Egyptian beliefs, the underworld is Aaru, the reed-fields of ideal hunting and fishing grounds where the dead lived after judgment. For the Celts, it was the Fortunate Isle of Mag Mell. For the classical Greeks, the Elysian fields was a paradisiacal land of plenty where adherents hoped the heroic and righteous dead would spend eternity. In the Zoroastrian Avesta, the "Best Existence" and the "House of Song" are places of the righteous dead. On the other hand, in cosmogonical contexts 'paradise' describes the world before it was tainted by evil.

The concept is a theme in art and literature, particularly of the pre-Enlightenment era. John Milton's Paradise Lost is an example of such usage.

== Etymology and concept history ==
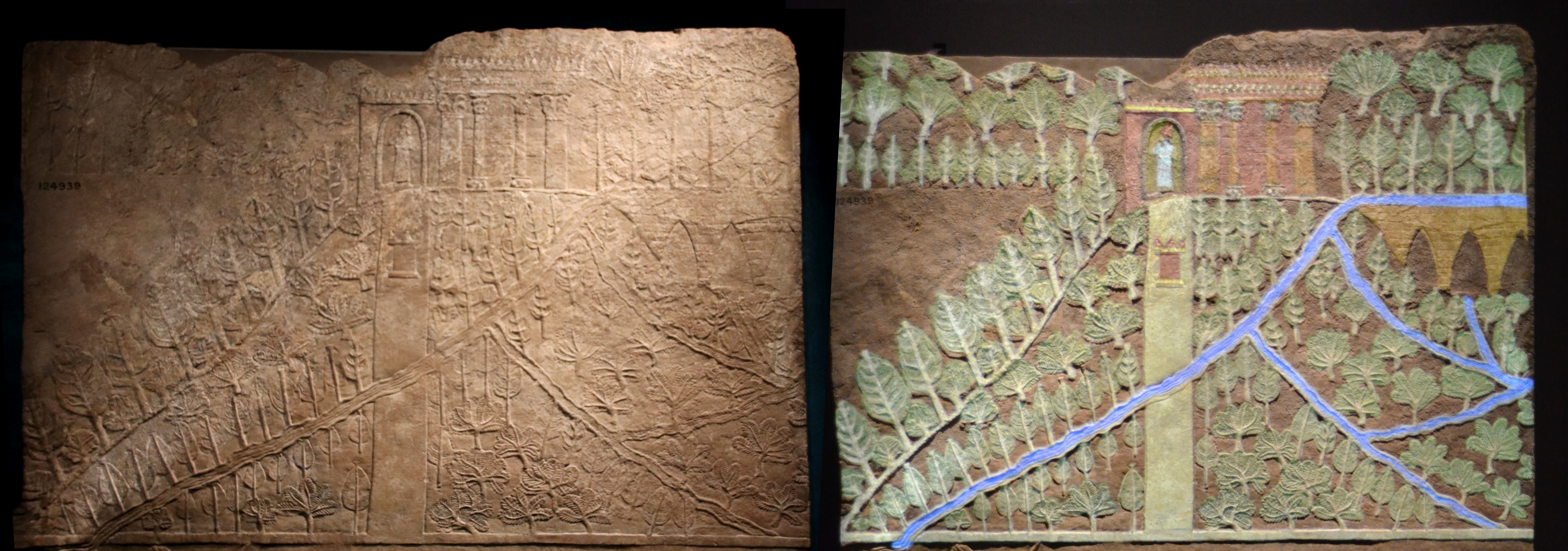
The luxurious palace and gardens of Neo-Assyrian king Ashurbanipal (ruled 668–631 BCE) at Nineveh, with original color reconstitution. Irrigation canals radiate from an aqueduct. The king appears under the porch. British Museum.

The word "paradise" entered English from the French paradis, inherited from the Latin paradisus, from Greek parádeisos (παράδεισος), from an Old Iranian form, from Proto-Iranian*parādaiĵah- "walled enclosure", whence Old Persian 𐎱𐎼𐎭𐎹𐎭𐎠𐎶 p-r-d-y-d-a-m /paridaidam/, Avestan 𐬞𐬀𐬌𐬭𐬌⸱𐬛𐬀𐬉𐬰𐬀 pairi-daêza-. The literal meaning of this Old Iranian language word is "walled (enclosure)", from pairi- 'around' (cognate with Greek περί of identical meaning) and -diz "to make, form (a wall), build" (cognate with Greek τεῖχος 'wall'). The word's etymology is ultimately derived from a PIE root *dheigʷ "to stick and set up (a wall)", and *per "around".

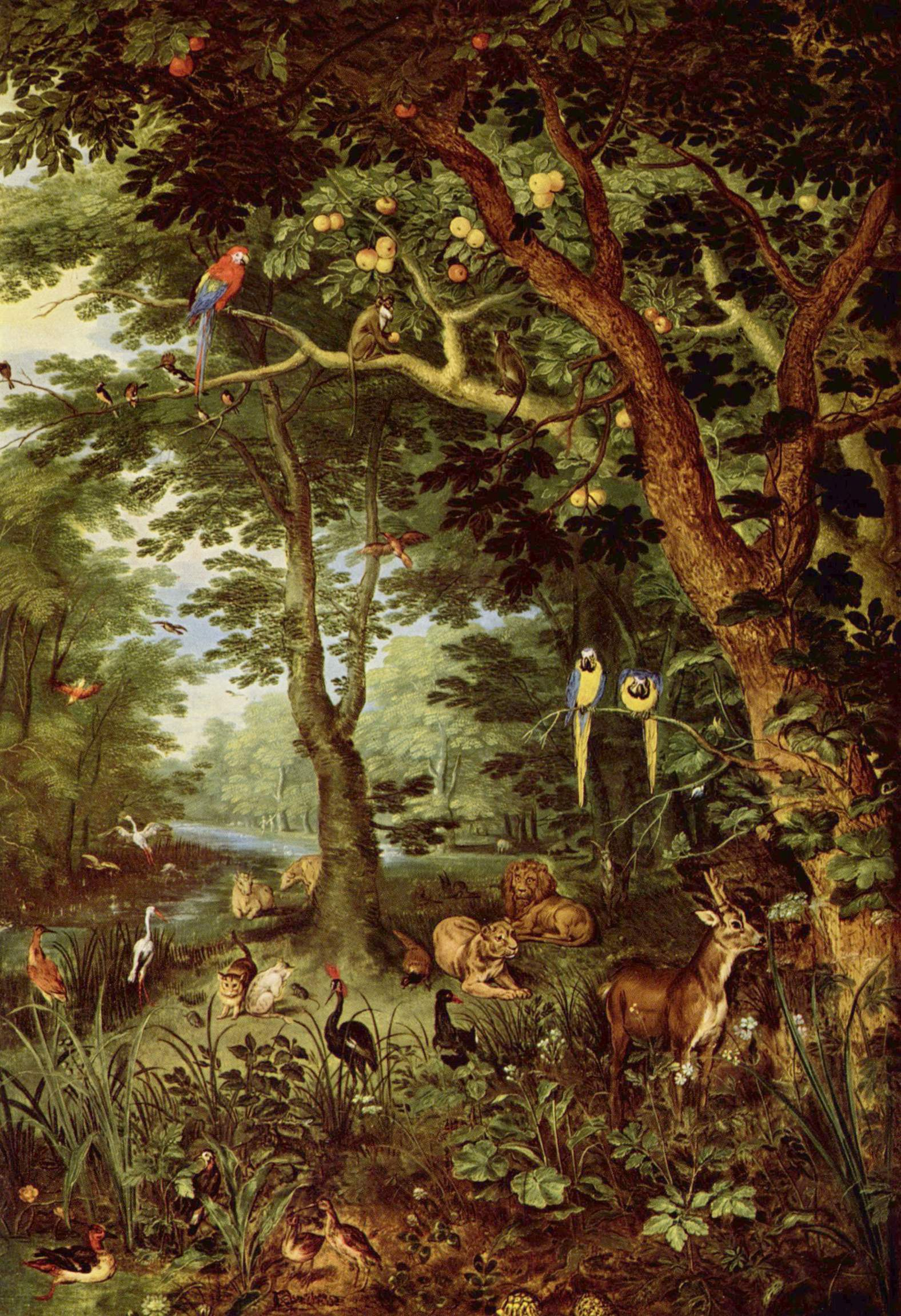
Paradise by Jan Bruegel, circa 1620

By the 6th/5th century BCE, the Old Iranian word had been borrowed into Assyrian pardesu "domain". It subsequently came to indicate the expansive walled gardens of the First Persian Empire, and was subsequently borrowed into Greek as παράδεισος parádeisos "park for animals" in the Anabasis of the early 4th century BCE Athenian Xenophon, Aramaic as pardaysa "royal park", and Hebrew as פַּרְדֵּס pardes, "orchard" (appearing thrice in the Tanakh; in the Song of Solomon (Song of Songs 4:13), Ecclesiastes (Ecclesiastes 2:5) and Nehemiah (Nehemiah 2:8)). In the Septuagint (3rd–1st centuries BCE), Greek παράδεισος parádeisos was used to translate both Hebrew פרדס pardes and Hebrew גן gan, "garden" (e.g. (Genesis 2:8, Ezekiel 28:13): it is from this usage that the use of "paradise" to refer to the Garden of Eden derives. The same usage also appears in Arabic and in the Quran as firdaws فردوس.

The idea of a walled enclosure was not preserved in most Iranian usage, and generally came to refer to a plantation or other cultivated area, not necessarily walled. For example, the Old Iranian word survives as Pardis in New Persian as well as its derivative pālīz (or "jālīz"), which denotes a vegetable patch.

== Biblical ==
=== Hebrew Bible ===
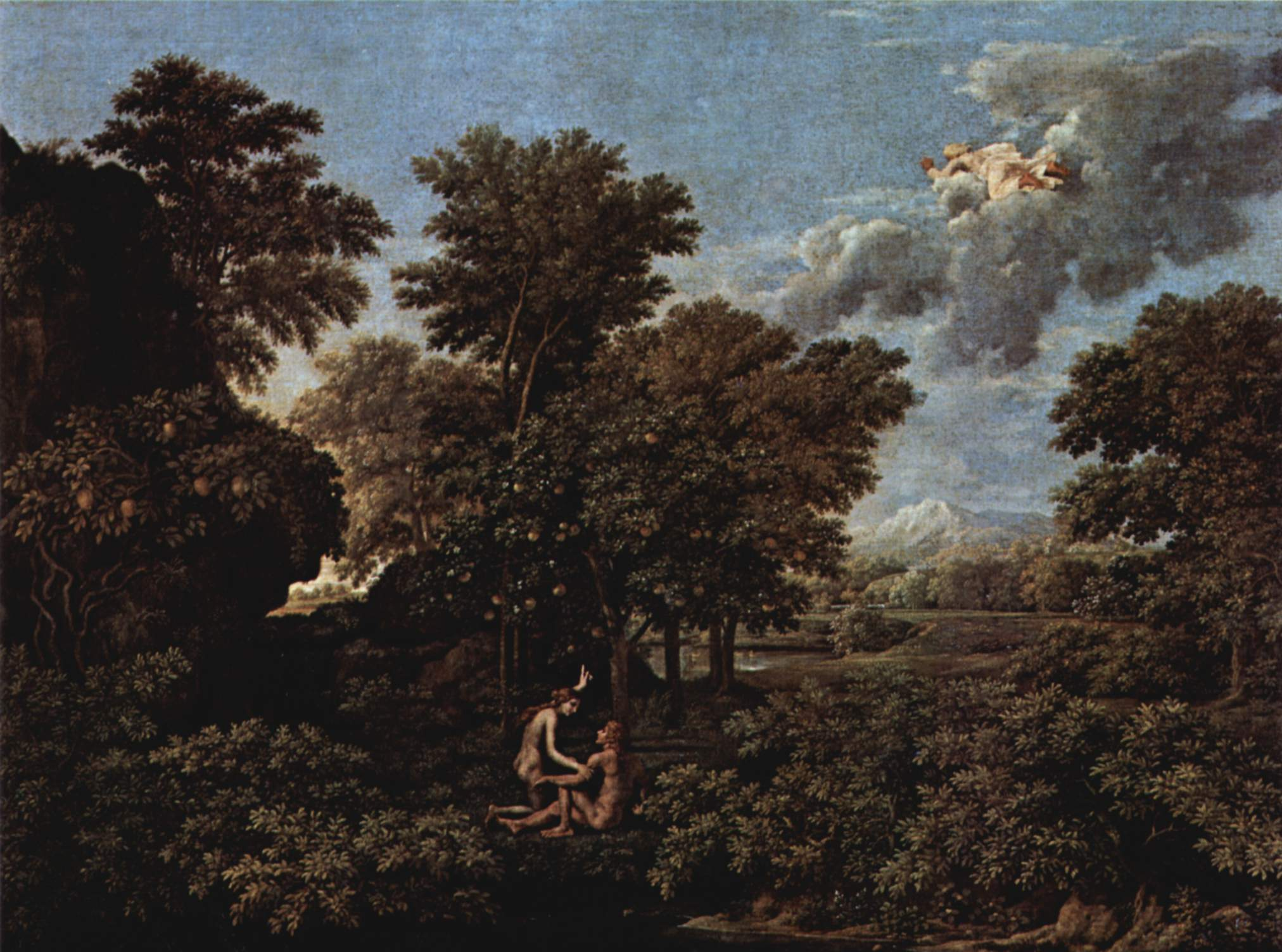
Nicolas Poussin, Four seasons of paradise, 1660–1664

The Hebrew word pardes appears only in the post-Exilic period (after 538 BCE); it occurs in the Song of Songs 4:13, Ecclesiastes 2:5, and Nehemiah 2:8, in each case meaning "park" or "garden", the original Persian meaning of the word, where it describes the royal parks of Cyrus the Great by Xenophon in Anabasis.

In Second Temple era Judaism, "paradise" came to be associated with the Garden of Eden and prophecies of restoration of Eden, and transferred to heaven.

In the apocryphal Apocalypse of Moses, Adam and Eve are expelled from paradise (rather than Eden) after the Fall of man, having been tricked by the serpent. After the death of Adam, the Archangel Michael carries Adam's body to be buried in Paradise, in the Third Heaven.

=== New Testament ===
The Greek word παράδεισος appears three times in the New Testament:

- Luke 23:43 – by Jesus on the cross, in response to the thief's request that Jesus remember him when he came into his kingdom.
- 2 Cor. 12:4 – in Paul's description of a third heaven paradise.
- Rev. 2:7 – alluding to the tree of life mentioned at Gen.2:8.

== Judaism ==
According to Jewish eschatology, the higher Gan Eden is called the "Garden of Righteousness". It has been created since the beginning of the world, and will appear gloriously at the end of time. The righteous dwelling there will enjoy the sight of the heavenly chayot carrying the throne of God. Each of the righteous will walk with God, who will lead them in a dance. Its Jewish and non-Jewish inhabitants are "clothed with garments of light and eternal life, and eat of the tree of life" (Enoch 58,3) near to God and His anointed ones. This Jewish rabbinical concept of a higher Gan Eden is opposed by the Hebrew terms gehinnom (the source, via Yiddish, of the English "Gehenna") and sheol, figurative names for the place of spiritual purification for the wicked dead in Judaism, a place envisioned as being at the greatest possible distance from heaven.

=== Rabbinic Judaism ===
In modern Jewish eschatology it is believed that history will complete itself and the ultimate destination will be when all mankind returns to the Garden of Eden.

In the Talmud and the Jewish Kabbalah, the scholars agree that there are two types of spiritual places called "Garden in Eden". The first is rather terrestrial, of abundant fertility and luxuriant vegetation, known as the "lower Gan Eden". The second is envisioned as being celestial, the habitation of righteous, Jewish and non-Jewish, immortal souls, known as the "higher Gan Eden". The rabbis differentiate between Gan and Eden. Adam is said to have dwelt only in the Gan, whereas Eden is said never to be witnessed by any mortal eye. In Rabbinic Judaism, the word 'Pardes' recurs, but less often in the Second Temple context of Eden or restored Eden. A well-known reference is in the Pardes story, where the word may allude to mystic philosophy.

The Zohar gives the word a mystical interpretation, and associates it with the four kinds of Biblical exegesis: peshat (literal meaning), remez (allusion), derash (anagogical), and sod (mystic). The initial letters of those four words then form פַּרְדֵּס – p(a)rd(e)s, which was in turn felt to represent the fourfold interpretation of the Torah (in which sod – the mystical interpretation – ranks highest).

== Christianity ==
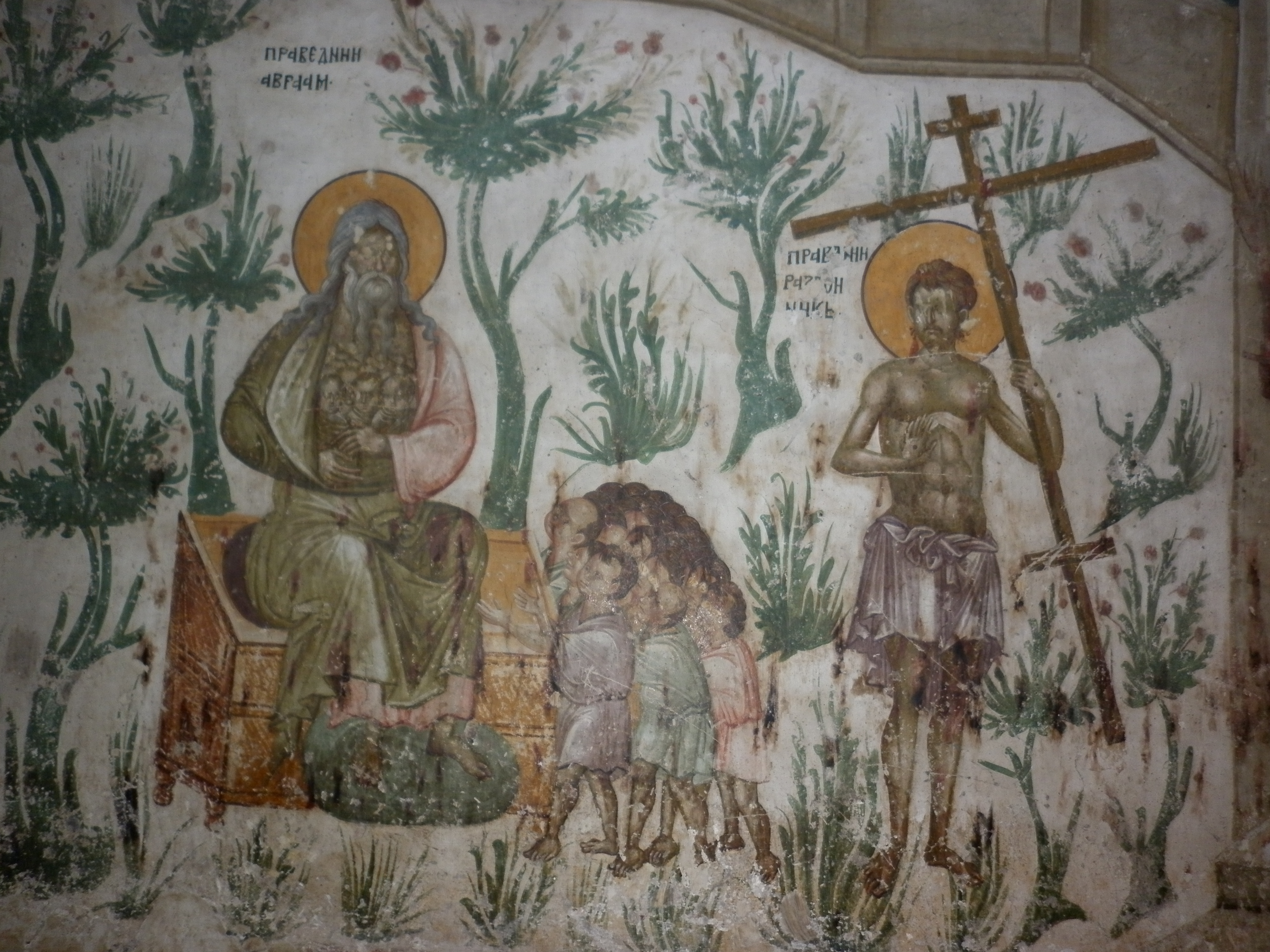
Abraham in paradise, Gračanica Monastery, Serbia

In the 2nd century AD, Irenaeus distinguished paradise from heaven. In Against Heresies, he wrote that only those deemed worthy would inherit a home in heaven, while others would enjoy paradise, and the rest live in the restored Jerusalem (which was mostly a ruin after the Jewish–Roman wars but was rebuilt beginning with Constantine the Great in the 4th century). Origen likewise distinguished paradise from heaven, describing paradise as the earthly "school" for souls of the righteous dead, preparing them for their ascent through the celestial spheres to heaven.

Many early Christians identified Abraham's bosom with paradise, where the souls of the righteous go until the resurrection of the dead; others were inconsistent in their identification of paradise, such as St. Augustine, whose views varied.

In Luke 23:43, Jesus has a conversation with one of those crucified with him, who asks, "Jesus, remember me when you come into your kingdom". Jesus answers him, "Truly I tell you, today you will be with me in paradise". This has often been interpreted to mean that on that same day the thief and Jesus would enter the intermediate resting place of the dead who were waiting for the Resurrection. Divergent views on paradise, and when one enters it, may have been responsible for a punctuation difference in Luke; for example, the two early Syriac versions translate Luke 23:43 differently. The Curetonian Gospels read "Today I tell you that you will be with me in paradise", whereas the Sinaitic Palimpsest reads "I tell you, today you will be with me in paradise". Likewise the two earliest Greek codices with punctuation disagree: Codex Vaticanus has a pause mark (a single dot on the baseline) in the original ink equidistant between 'today' and the following word (with no later corrections and no dot before "today"), whereas Codex Alexandrinus has the "today in paradise" reading. In addition, an adverb of time is never used in the nearly 100 other places in the Gospels where Jesus uses the phrase, "Truly I say to you".

In Christian art, Fra Angelico's Last Judgement painting shows Paradise on its left side. There is a tree of life (and another tree) and a circle dance of liberated souls. In the middle is a hole. In Muslim art it similarly indicates the presence of the Prophet or divine beings. It visually says, "Those here cannot be depicted".

=== Jehovah's Witnesses ===
Jehovah's Witnesses believe, from their interpretation of the Book of Genesis, that God's original purpose was, and is, to have the earth filled with the offspring of Adam and Eve as caretakers of a global paradise. However, Adam and Eve rebelled against God's sovereignty and were banished from the Garden of Eden, driven out of paradise into toil and misery.

Jehovah's Witnesses believe that disobedient and wicked people will be destroyed by Christ at Armageddon and those obedient to Christ will live eternally in a restored earthly paradise. Joining the survivors will be the resurrected righteous and unrighteous people who died prior to Armageddon. The latter are brought back because they paid for their sins by their death and/or because they lacked opportunity to learn of Jehovah's requirements before dying. These will be judged on the basis of their post-resurrection obedience to instructions revealed in new "scrolls". They believe that resurrection of the dead to paradise earth is made possible by Christ's blood and the ransom sacrifice. This provision does not apply to those whom Christ as Judge deems to have sinned against God's holy spirit.

The earthly paradise believed by Jehovah's Witnesses emphasizes the removal of all sin and suffering, by the restoration of the people to their perfect state often referencing Revelation 21:4 "He will wipe every tear from their eyes. There will be no more death or mourning or crying or pain, for the old order of things has passed away." and Psalms 37:29 "The righteous will possess the earth, and they will live forever in it."

=== Mormonism ===
In Latter Day Saint theology, paradise usually refers to the spirit world, the place where spirits dwell following death and awaiting the resurrection. In that context, "paradise" is the state of the righteous after death. In contrast, the wicked and those who have not yet learned the gospel of Jesus Christ await the resurrection in spirit prison. After the universal resurrection, all persons will be assigned to a particular kingdom or degree of glory. This may also be termed "paradise".

== Islam ==
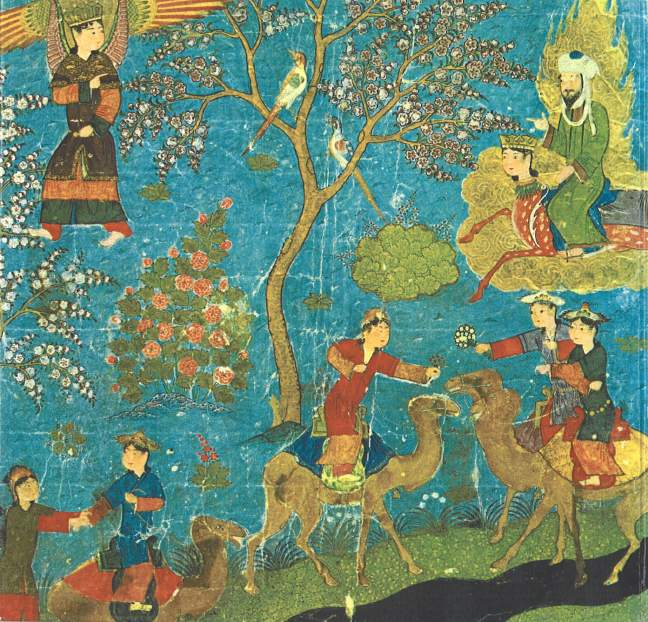
15th century illustration of Mohammed (upper right) visiting Paradise while riding Buraq, accompanied by the angel Gabriel (upper left)

In the Quran, Heaven is denoted as Jannah (garden), with the highest level being called Firdaus, i.e. Paradise. It is used instead of Heaven to describe the ultimate pleasurable place after death, accessible by those who pray, donate to charity, and believe in: Allah, the angels, his revealed books, his prophets and messengers, the Day of Judgement and divine decree (Qadr), and follow God's will in their life. Heaven in Islam is used to describe skies in the literal sense and metaphorically to refer to the universe. In Islam, the bounties and beauty of Heaven are immense, so much so that they are beyond the abilities of mankind's worldly mind to comprehend. There are eight doors of Jannah. These are eight grades of Jannah:

1. Jannah al-Mawa
2. Dar al-Maqam
3. Dar al-Salam
4. Dar al-Khuld
5. Jannah al-Adn
6. Jannah al-Na'im
7. Jannah al-Kasif
8. Jannah al-Firdaus

Jannah al-Mawa is in the lowest, Jannah al-Adn is the middle and Jannah al-Firdaus is the highest.

Imam Bukhari has also recorded the tradition in which the Prophet said,

'When you ask from Allah, ask Him for Al-Firdaus, for it is the middle of Paradise and it is the highest place and from it the rivers of Paradise flow.' (Bukhari, Ahmad, Baihaqi)

In this tradition, it is evident that Al-Firdaus is the highest place in Paradise, yet, it is stated that it is in the middle. While giving an explanation of this description of Al-Firdaus, the great scholar, Ibn Hibban states,

'Al-Firdaus being in the middle of Paradise means that with respect to the width and breadth of Paradise, Al-Firdaus is in the middle. And with respect to being 'the highest place in Paradise', it refers to it being on a height.'

This explanation is in agreement to the explanation which has been given by Abu Hurairah (r.a.) who said that

'Al Firdaus is a mountain in Paradise from which the rivers flow.' (Tafseer Al Qurtubi Vol. 12 pg. 100)

The Quran also gave a warning that not all Muslims or even the believers will assuredly be permitted to enter Jannah except those who had struggled in the name of God and tested from God's trials as faced by the messengers of God or ancient prophets:

Or do you think that you will enter Paradise while such [trial] has not yet come to you as came to those who passed on before you? They were touched by poverty and hardship and were shaken until [even their] messenger and those who believed with him said,"When is the help of Allah ?" Unquestionably, the help of Allah is near.
— Qur'an 2:214 (Al-Baqarah) (Saheeh International)

Other instances where paradise is mentioned in the Qur'an includes descriptions of springs, silk garments, embellished carpets and women with beautiful eyes. These elements can also be seen as depicted within Islamic art and architecture.

"The semblance of Paradise (Jannah) promised the pious and devout (is that of a garden) with streams of water that will not go rank, and rivers of milk whose taste will not undergo a change, and rivers of wine delectable to drinkers, and streams of purified honey, and fruits of every kind in them, and forgiveness from their Lord." (47:15).

=== References to Paradise (Jannah) in the Qur'an as reflected in Islamic art ===
The Qur'an contains multiple passages in which paradise, or 'Jannah', is referred to. The Holy Book contains 166 references to gardens, of which nineteen mention 'Jannah', connoting both images of paradise through gardens, water features, and fruit-bearing trees. Scholars are unable to confirm that certain artistic choices were solely intended to reflect the Qur'an's description of paradise, since there are not extensive historical records to reference to. However, many elements of Islamic art and architecture can certainly be interpreted as being intended to reflect paradise as described in the Qur'an, and there are particular historical records which support a number of case studies in this claim.

Historical evidence does support the claim that certain Islamic garden structures and mosaics, particularly those of Spanish, Persian and Indian origins, were intended to mirror a scene of paradise as described in the Qur'an.

=== Water features in Islamic gardens ===
The Alhambra, Court of the Lions, Grenada, Spain

The structural layout of the gardens of the Alhambra in Grenada, embodies the idea of water as a symbol of representing paradise within Islamic gardens. In particular, the Courtyard of the Lions, which follows the Quarter Garden, or the 'Chahar-Bagh' layout, typical to Islamic gardens, features a serene water fountain at its centre. The fountain is carved with stone lions, with the water emerging from the mouths of these lions. The static nature of the locally sourced water features within the Courtyard of the Lions at the Alhambra, adds to the atmosphere of serenity and stillness which is typical of Islamic gardens that utilise water features, resembling the image of paradise as found in the Qur'an.

=== Tomb Gardens as representing Paradise ===
There is not yet concrete evidence that Islamic gardens were solely intended to represent images of paradise. However, it can be deduced from certain inscriptions and intentions of structures, that creating an atmosphere of divinity and serenity were part of the artists' intentions.

Tombs became the metaphorical 'paradise on Earth' for Islamic architecture and gardens; they were a place of eternal peace were devout followers of God could rest.

The Taj Mahal

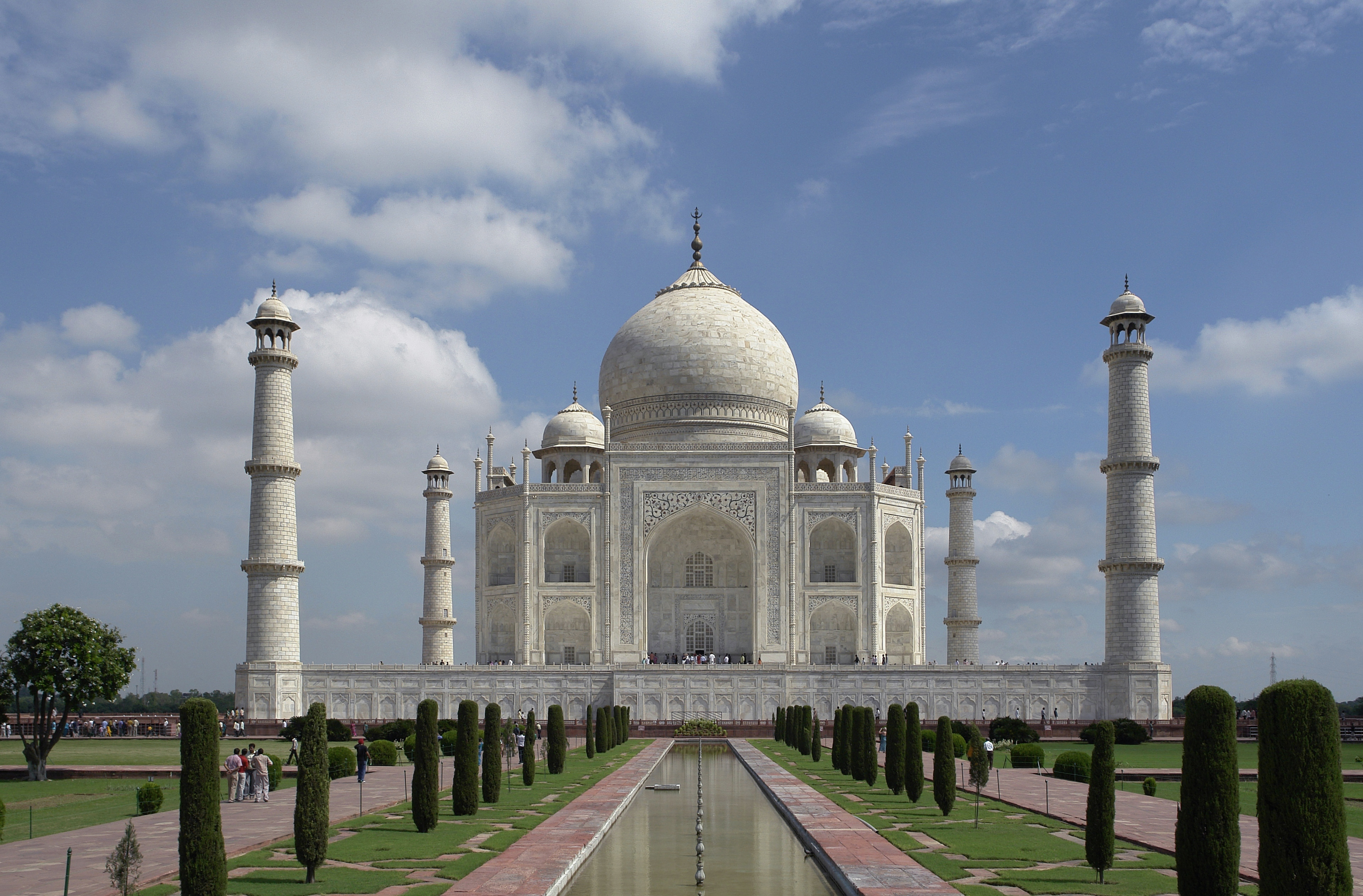
Tomb mausoleum at the Taj Mahal, India

Upon the exterior of the tomb mausoleum of the Taj Mahal, inscriptions of passages from the Qur'an adorn the exterior facades, encasing the iwans. These inscriptions rehearse passages of an eschatological nature, referencing the Day of Judgement and themes of paradise. Similarly, the placement of the tomb structure within the waterscape garden environment heightens the conceptual relationship between tomb gardens and a place of paradise as discussed in the Qur'an. Similarly, the white marble used for the construction of the tomb mausoleum, furthers the relationship between the purity and divinity of the tomb, elevating the status of the tomb to that of paradise.

=== Mosaic representations of paradise within Islamic Architecture ===
Preserved historical writings from an interview with the artisan of the Prophet's Mosque at Medina between 705 and 715, revealed how the mosaic depictions of gardens within this mosque were in fact created "according to the picture of the Tree of Paradise and its palaces". Structures that are similarly adorned with naturalistic mosaics, and were created during the same period as the Prophet's Mosque at Medina, can be said to have had the same intended effect.

The mosaic of the Dome of the Rock, Jerusalem

Constructed between 690 and 692, the Dome of the Rock at Jerusalem features a large-scale mosaic on the interior of the domed structure. It is likely that this richly embellished and detailed mosaic was intended to replicate an image of paradise, featuring fruit-bearing trees, vegetal motifs and flowing rivers. Accompanied by a calligraphic frieze, the mosaic depicts symmetrical and vegetal vine scrolls, surrounded by trees of blue, green and turquoise mosaics. Jewel-like embellishments as well as gold pigment complete the mosaic. Not only did mosaics of this kind seek to reflect paradise as described in the Qur'an, but they were also thought to represent and proclaim Muslim victories.

The mosaic of The Great Mosque of Damascus, Syria

In a similar instance, the mosaic within the Great Mosque of Damascus, constructed within a similar timeframe to the Dome of the Rock, features the most noticeable elements of a paradisiacal garden as described in the Qur'an. Therefore, it would not be unreasonable to suggest that the mosaic on the exterior facade of the Great Mosque of Damascus, was similarly intended to replicate an image of paradise in the viewer's mind.

== Gnosticism ==
On the Origin of the World, a text from the Nag Hammadi library held in ancient Gnosticism, describes Paradise as being located outside the circuit of the Sun and Moon in the luxuriant Earth east in the midst of stones. The Tree of Life, which will provide for the souls of saints after they come out of their corrupted bodies, is located in the north of Paradise besides the Tree of Knowledge that contains the power of God.

== See also ==
- Deylaman
- Dilmun
- Eridu
- El Dorado
- Fiddler's Green
- Golden Age
- Vaikuntha
- Goloka
- Nirvana
- Shangri-La
- Tír na nÓg
- Valhalla
- Paradise garden
