= Third Heaven =

Division of Heaven in Judaism, Christianity and Islam

In several Abrahamic religions, the Third Heaven is a division of Heaven in religious cosmology. In some traditions it is considered the abode of God, and in others a lower level of Paradise, commonly one of seven.

== Judaism ==
The early books of the Tanakh reference Heaven (Heb. Shamayim), but not a Third Heaven or a specific number of heavens. Heaven is mentioned several times in the first chapter of Genesis. It appears in the first verse as a creation of God. His dividing the light from the darkness in verses 4 and 5 has been interpreted as the separation of heaven into two sections: day (God's throne) and night (where our universe is contained). In verse 8 heaven refers to the atmosphere over the Earth in which birds fly, and in verse 14 it's the setting for the celestial lights, later identified (verse 16) as the Sun, Moon and stars.

A third concept of Heaven, also called shămei hashamayim (שׁמי השׁמים or "Heaven of Heavens"), is mentioned in such passages as Genesis 28:12, Deuteronomy 10:14 and 1 Kings 8:27 as a distinctly spiritual realm containing (or being traveled by) angels and God.

The ambiguity of the term shamayim in the Hebrew Bible, and the fact that it's a plural word, give "heavens" various interpretations regarding its nature, notably the ascension of the prophet Elijah.

In the non-canonical Second Book of Enoch, Third Heaven is described as a location "between corruptibility and incorruptibility" containing the Tree of Life, "whereon the Lord rests, when he goes up into paradise." (chapter 8) Two springs in the Third Heaven, one of milk and the other of honey, along with two others of wine and oil, flow down into the Garden of Eden. (verse 6) In contrast with the common concept of Paradise, the Second Book of Enoch also describes it as "a very terrible place" for those who do wrong, with "all manner of tortures" inflicted by merciless angels on "those who dishonour God, who on earth practice sin against nature," including sodomites, sorcerers, enchanters, witches, the proud, thieves, liars and those guilty of various other transgressions. (chapter 10)

In the Slavonic version of the Greek Apocalypse of Baruch, also known as 3 Baruch, the author is shown a phoenix, and a dragon residing there is said to eat the bodies of "those that have spent their lives in evil."

In The Legends of the Jews by Louis Ginzberg, this third division of Paradise is said to be, like the other six, "twelve myriads of miles in width and twelve myriads of miles in length," built of silver and gold, and containing "the best of everything there is in heaven."

=== Residents ===
Aside from the redeemed, the transgressors and various angels mentioned in the Bible and other Hebrew literature, a number of specific figures and spirits are mentioned as residing in the Third Heaven. According to The Legends of the Jews by Louis Ginzberg these include:

- Abraham
- Isaac
- Jacob
- Moses
- Aaron
- Azrael
- the Israelites of the Exodus
- the kings of Judah (notably David, but "with the exception of Manasseh, the son of Hezekiah, who presides in the second division, over the penitents")

== Christianity ==
=== Apostolic Fathers ===
The early Church Fathers, many of whom were supposedly taught directly by the Apostles, spoke of three heavens. In the common parlance of the time, the atmosphere where birds fly was considered the first heaven, the space where the stars resided was regarded as the second heaven, and God's abode was deemed the third heaven.

=== New Testament ===
In 2 Corinthians 12, Paul the Apostle writes: "I know a person in Christ who fourteen years ago was caught up to the third heaven—whether in the body or out of the body I do not know; God knows. Also, I know that such a person—whether in the body or out of the body I do not know; God knows—was caught up into Paradise and heard things that are not to be told, that no mortal is permitted to repeat." According to E. W. Bullinger, the Greek reads "caught away", not "caught up," possibly reflecting Jewish beliefs that Paradise was located somewhere other than the uppermost heaven. Other Christians argue that because the idea of three heavens is found nowhere else in the Bible, Paul is simply referring to the spiritual heaven, or non-physical place where God is, with the term "the third heaven." In this view, the first and second heavens then refer merely to the physical "heavens" where the atmosphere and outer space are respectively, and "the third heaven" is meant to signify that it is the "heavens" other than either of those.

Ideas about the system of "heavens" held by Jews and Christians in first-century communities are also evident in the non-canonical Second Book of Enoch (see previous section).

=== New Testament apocrypha ===
According to the Apocalypse of James, John the Baptist dwells in the Third Heaven.

=== Church of Jesus Christ of Latter-day Saints ===
LDS theology interprets the third heaven to be the Celestial Kingdom, the highest of three degrees of glory rewarded by God following the resurrection and final judgment.

In 1st Corinthians 15 are mentioned three glories of heaven, which are compared to the sun, moon, and stars. Latter-day Saints believe that after the resurrection, there are three differing degrees of glory and that with few exceptions, all people will be judged and separated into these degrees.

== Islam ==
According to Islamic tradition, Muhammad's Mi'raj (ascension through the heavens) included an admission to the Third Heaven by the angel Gabriel, in which he met Joseph, who received him warmly. Islamic tradition also places Azrael, the angel of death, in the Third Heaven. The third heaven is depicted as being constructed of pearl and/or luminous metals.

According to Shi'ite sources, the Third Heaven is named Marum (Arabic: ماروم). Sunni sources call the third layer Qaydum and consists of ruby.

== See also ==
- Empyrean
- Víðbláinn
- Yāma
