= Yāma =

Third of the six heavenly worlds of the desire realm in Buddhist cosmology

Translations of Yāma
- Sanskrit: याम (IAST: Yāma)
- Pali: याम (Yāma)
- Chinese: 夜摩天 (Pinyin: Yèmótiān)
- Japanese: 夜摩天 or 時分 or 善分 (Rōmaji: yamaten or jibun or zenbun)
- Korean: 야마천 (RR: yamacheon)
- Tibetan: འཐབ་བྲལ་ Wylie: 'thab bral THL: tabdral
- Thai: ยามา
- Vietnamese: Dạ-ma thiên

Yāma is the third of the six heavenly worlds of the desire realm in Buddhist cosmology. It is located between Trāyastriṃśa and Tushita. This world is variously translated as "wonderful times", "virtuous", "excellent times" or "of the hours."

It is said that the Yāma heaven is always illuminated so that there is no division of day and night. The gods here enjoy satisfaction of the five desires, which arise in relation to the five sense organs.

== Etymology ==
Yāma is a Sanskrit technical term referring to a measurement of time, similar to a "watch" in English. A 24-hour day is divided into eight three-hour "watches", which makes a yāma equal to 1/4 of a day or night. An equivalent unit of time is a prahar, which is synonymous with the modern pahar.

A Chinese text referred to as the Sse-kiau-tsih reads that the gods of this world distinguish time by the opening and shutting of flowers.

There are several Chinese translations / kanji transcriptions of the name Yāma, including but not limited to 焰摩天, 夜摩天, 唱樂天, 時分天, and 炎魔.

== Descriptions ==
Yāma is the first heaven that functions as a disconnect between the swarga heavens (Heavens in which Devas can interact with humans) and the human realm. The deities here are not involved in conflict with the asuras due to them being positioned above Tāvatiṁsa on Mount Meru and are said to "have arrived at divine bliss" (dibbaṃ sukhaṃ) (Vibh-a 18:6,1).

According to the Visakhuposatha Sutta of the Pāli Canon, time there runs very differently than on Earth:

"That which among men is two hundred years...is one night and day of the Yāma devas, their month has thirty of those days, their year twelve of those months; the lifespan of the Yāma devas is two thousand of those heavenly years."

A month in this world may be calculated to be 6,000 human years. A Yāma deva year is 72,000 years, and a Yāma deva lifespan is 144,000,000 years.

According to the Dāna Sutta, those who practice generosity with the intention of continuing a family custom of such deeds create the karmic conditions to be reborn in Yāma Heaven.

=== Mahāyāna ===
The Amitāyurdhyāna Sūtra provides a few further details. Yāma Heaven includes the river Jambū, and a celestial palace that features a canopy decorated with five hundred million jewels, compared with that found in Amitābha's Pure Land.

According to the Avataṃsaka Sūtra in 60 fascicles, bodhisattvas of the fourth stage may become the ruler of this heaven.

== See also ==
- Yama (Buddhism) - An arguably unrelated deity in the Buddhist pantheon
- Third Heaven
