= Temple of Nabu =

There have been many temples dedicated to Nabu.

- Temple of Nabu (Assur)
- Temple of Nabu (Babylon), called Nabu-sha-Khare
- Temple of Nabu (Borsippa), known as the Ezida
- Temple of Nabu (Dur-Sharrukin)
- Temple of Nabu (Nimrud)
- Temple of Nabu (Nineveh)
- Temple of Nabu (Palmyra)
