= Nuraita =

Nuraita or Nhuraita (spelling variations: Nuraitha, Nhuraitha) is a Mandaean female given name that may refer to a few different figures in the Ginza Rabba and other Mandaean texts:

- Nuraita, Noah's wife
- Nuraita, Dinanukht's wife
