= Aerial toll house =

Controversial doctrine in the Eastern Orthodox Church

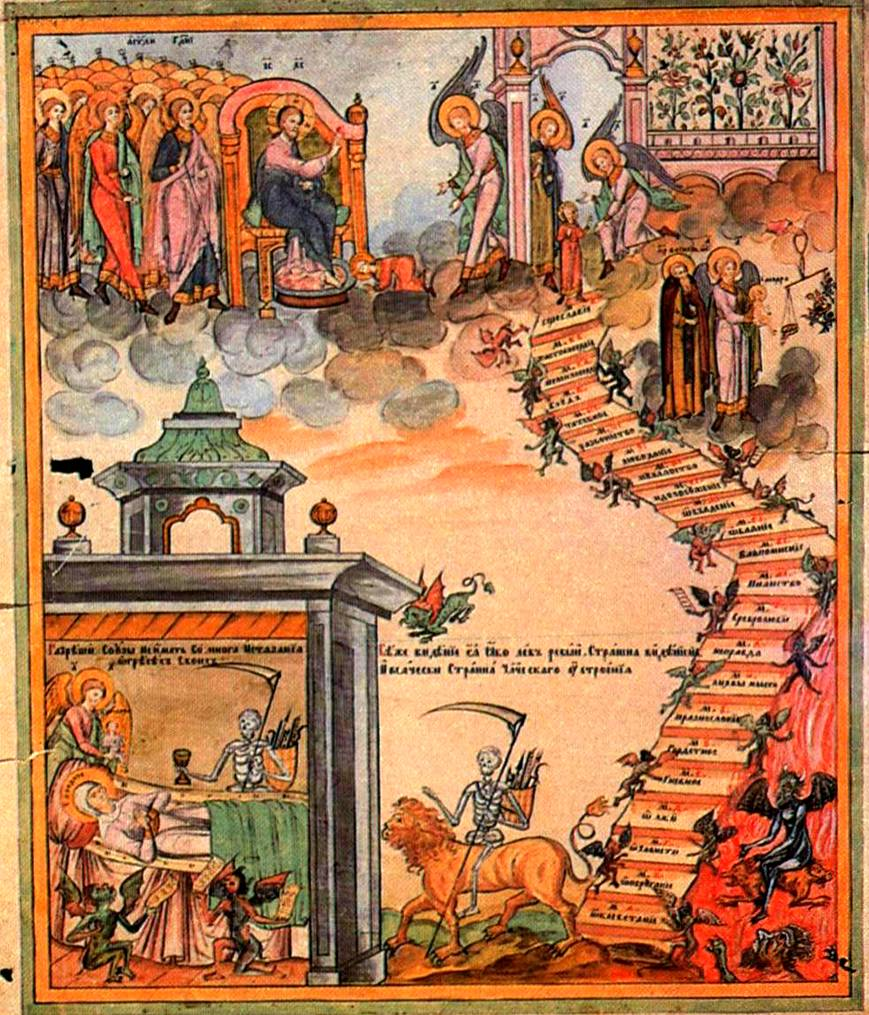
Death of Theodora, spiritual student of Basil the Younger, and visions of spiritual trials

Aerial toll houses (also called "telonia", from the Greek: τελωνεία / telonia, customs) are a belief held by some in the Eastern Orthodox Church which states that "following a person's death the soul leaves the body, and is escorted to God by angels. During this journey the soul passes through an aerial realm, which is inhabited by wicked spirits. The soul encounters these demons at various points referred to as toll-houses where the demons then attempt to accuse it of sin and, if possible, drag the soul into hell."

A number of the Eastern Orthodox saints, modern elders and theologians have openly endorsed it, but some theologians and bishops have condemned it as heretical and gnostic in origin.

Aerial toll houses are part of the particular judgment.

== Teaching ==
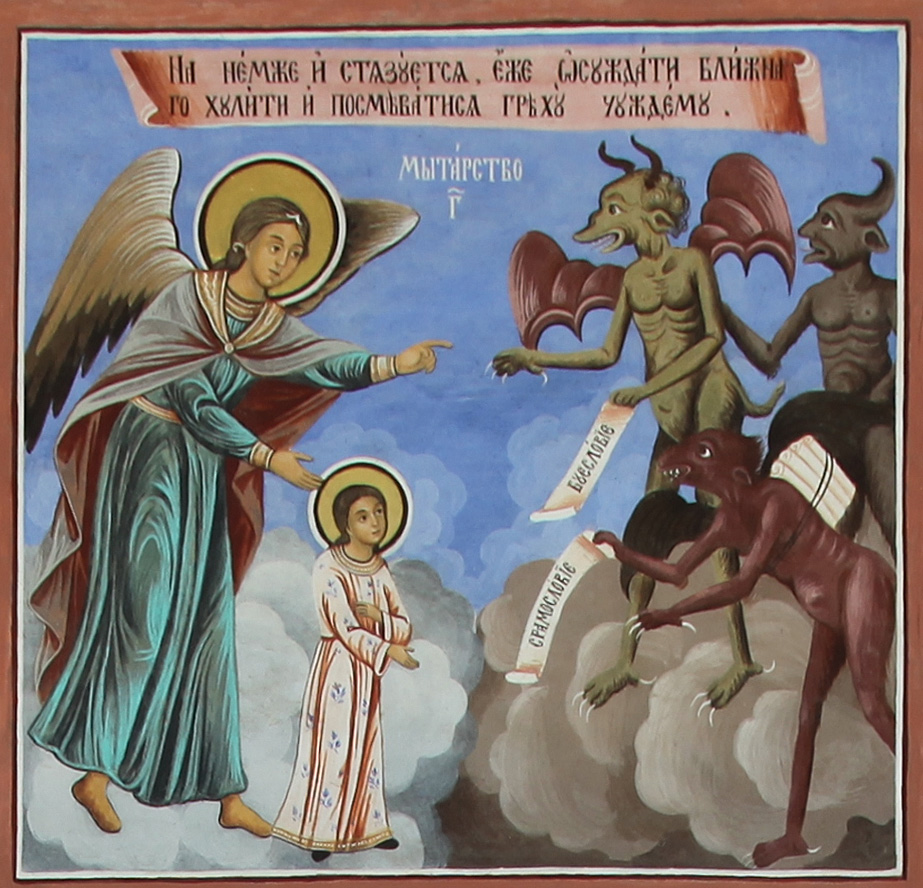
Demons showing a soul its sins at the third aerial toll house. Fresco of the Rila Monastery.

The most detailed account of the aerial toll-houses is found in the biography of Basil the Younger, found in the Lives of Saints for 26 March. In this rendering, Theodora, spiritual student of Basil, appeared to another student, the pious and holy layman Gregory. According to the story, Gregory had prayed to God and asked him to inform them of what happened to Theodora after her death. God answered his prayers (according to this account) by sending Theodora herself to Gregory; and told him, in great detail, about her journey through the toll houses.

According to Theodora's teaching, every Christian has a demon who tempts him or her. These demons keep a record of every sin of thought or action they succeed in tempting a person to commit, though repented sins are erased from the demonic records. On the third day after the soul separates from the body, according to this account, it is carried by angels towards Heaven. On the way, souls must go past twenty aerial toll-houses. Each toll house is populated by demons devoted to particular sins. At each toll-house, demons demand that souls "pay" for their sins by giving an account of compensatory good deeds. If the soul is unable to compensate for a sin, the demons take it to hell.

=== Toll houses ===
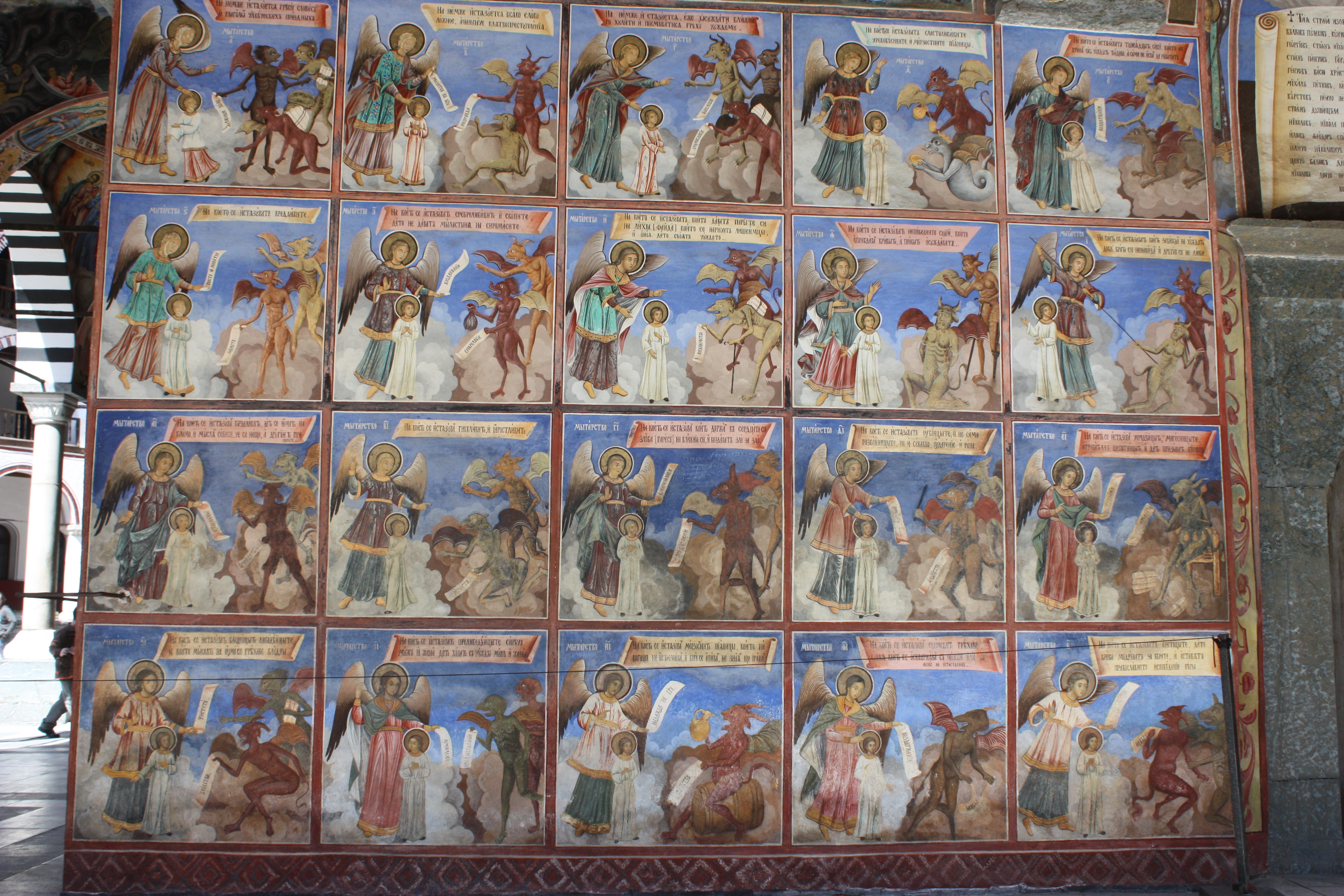
Twenty toll houses, fresco of Rila Monastery

There are twenty toll-houses, though the number is not dogmatic and different sources list varying numbers. On the first aerial toll-house, the soul is questioned about the sins of the tongue. The remaining are, in order:

- Lies
- Slander
- Gluttony
- Laziness
- Theft
- Covetousness
- Usury
- Injustice
- Envy
- Pride
- Anger
- Remembering evil
- Murder
- Magic
- Lust
- Adultery
- Sodomy
- Heresy
- Unmercifulness

== Origin ==
Mentions of toll houses can be found in the hymnology of the Church, and in stories of the lives of some saints and their writings.

Prayers mentioning the aerial accusers can be found in Liturgical texts and official E. Orthodox books like the Slavonic Great Euchologion (The Great Book of Needs): "do thou banish from me the commander of the bitter toll-gatherers and ruler of the earth [...] O holy Theotokos" (Ode 8, Troparion 3). Other church hymns say that the souls have to "pass through the rulers of darkness standing in the air." In the Greek and Slavonic Euchologion, in the canon for the departure of the soul by St. Andrew, the following words are found in Ode 7: "All holy angels of the Almighty God, have mercy upon me and save me from all the evil toll-houses". In the Canon of Supplication at the Parting of the Soul in The Great Book of Needs are found the following references to the struggle of a soul passing through the toll houses: "Count me worthy to pass, unhindered, by the persecutor, the prince of the air, the tyrant, him that stands guard in the dread pathways, and the false accusation of these, as I depart from earth" (Ode 4, p. 77). "Do thou count me worthy to escape the hordes of bodiless barbarians, and rise through the aerial depths and enter into Heaven" (Ode 8, p. 81).

The toll house doctrine can be found for example in the Life of Saint Anthony the Great written by Athanasius of Alexandria, in the life of Basil the New and Theodora, in the homilies of Cyril of Alexandria, or in a discourse of Abba Isaiah. Some authors of the Philokalia, "an authoritative anthology of writings on the prayer of the heart", taught about the toll houses. For example, Saint Theodoros the Great Ascetic instructs to "reflect on the dreadful reckoning that is to come, how the harsh keepers of the toll homes will bring before as one by one the actions, words and thoughts which they suggested but which we accepted and made our own". The same way, Saint John of Karpathos wrote: "When the soul leaves the body, the enemy advances to attack it, fiercely reviling it and accusing it of its sins in a harsh and terrifying manner. But if a soul enjoys the love of God and has faith in Him, even though in the past it has often been wounded by sin, it is not frightened by the enemy's attacks and threats."

"The tradition of the tollgates was firmly established throughout the east long before the end of late antiquity, although it received typically Byzantine elaboration in the tenth-century Life of Basil the Younger (d. 944)". Gennadios Scholarios, Patriarch of Constantinople from 1454 to 1464, "stated that the trial of the 'tollgates' was, in fact, the Byzantine equivalent of purgatory, minus the fireworks".

== Contemporary situation ==
=== Support ===
The 19th-century saint Ignatius Brianchaninov insisted on the truthfulness of the teaching. Seraphim Rose claims the teaching is taught in some forms in hagiographical and other spiritual texts from quite early in the history of the Church.

A number of contemporary church figures support the teaching on toll-houses, including Ephraim (Moraitis), Constantine Cavarnos, Fr. Seraphim (Rose), Met. Hierotheos (Vlachos), John of Shanghai and San Francisco, Justin Popović in his Dogmatics of the Orthodox Church, Nikolaj Velimirović, and Michael Pomazansky.

=== Criticism ===
The Eastern Orthodox theologian David Bentley Hart considers this teaching to be a heresy, and the Eastern Orthodox theologian Adnan Trabulsi opposes the toll houses teaching. Eastern Orthodox theologian Dr Paul Ladouceur considers the Life of Saint Basil to be a forgery; furthermore, he writes that the toll-house teaching "is not the sole strand of thinking on the afterlife within the [Eastern] Orthodox tradition. It is not unusual in [Eastern] Orthodoxy to have different and even apparently overlapping elements within the overall tradition, on matters on which there exist no formal church dogmas. It is thus misleading and erroneous to present toll-house theology as 'the teaching of the [Eastern] Orthodox Church' when in reality it is only part of Orthodox tradition concerning the afterlife."

Likewise, Religious Studies Professor Stephen J. Shoemaker wrote: "The truth of the matter is that the state of the dead was never precisely defined in the [Eastern] Orthodox tradition, and just as in other matters related to the afterlife, 'the Byzantines had no ‘system’ around the last things. Eschatology remained for them an open horizon within theology." He also stated that the belief in toll houses was "an error" which "must be regarded as an opinion, even if sometimes a popular one in sometimes popular times and places, rather than a fundamental element of the orthodox Christian faith." He stated that since "[s]uch a doctrine was almost unknown during the first millennium, and even during the second, it remains but one vision of the fate of the soul among other alternatives"; he adds that since the only references to this belief during the first millennium are to be found in St. Athanasius' Life of Anthony, in an homily "widely regarded as spurious[ly]" attributed to Cyril of Alexandria, and in "pious tales attributed to a certain Macarius and Anastasius of Sinai", the doctrine "fails spectacularly" to pass the test of the Vincentian canon. He adds that moreover the E. Orthodox prayer for the dead does not mention toll houses. Shoemaker states that the belief that when the soul leaves the body it is met by angels and demons who fight to get the soul and that the outcome of the fight is greatly influenced by the sins of the soul, is a separate belief to that of the toll houses. He says this belief, contrarily to the toll houses belief, was "expressed by a number of [Eastern] Orthodox writers across the ages", but that it remains an opinion "among many other [Eastern] Orthodox opinions about what happens to the soul after it leaves the body."

=== Puhalo and Azkoul ===
The Holy Synod of the Russian Orthodox Church Outside of Russia had a session on "a controversy raised by Deacon Lev. Puhalo," the main opponent of the toll-house teaching. The resolution stated the Holy Synod "demands the cessation in our magazines of controversy", "this controversy must be ended on both sides", and "Deacon Lev Puhalo is forbidden to lecture in the parishes."

Michael Azkoul argues that Seraphim Rose is its only contemporary theological proponent. Rose, an American Orthodox hieromonk and theologian, wrote a book on the subject, The Soul After Death. While Ignatius Brianchaninov, John Maximovich, Rose and Metropolitan Hierotheos Vlachos endeavored to demonstrate that this teaching is derived from patristic and other church sources, his opponents, among them Azkoul and Archbishop Lazar (Puhalo) (a retired hierarch in the Orthodox Church in America, who had previously been defrocked from the Russian Orthodox Church Outside Russia), found his conclusions questionable.

However, two dedicated chapters in the book The Departure of the Soul According to the Teaching of the Orthodox Church allegedly reveal for the first time over 100 falsifications, misrepresentations, and errors in Puhalo's and Azkoul's writings. Puhalo reportedly falsified reproduction of several ancient icons and falsified translations of the writings and lives of several saints, while Azkoul is said to have falsified several patristic texts. Both writers' works are asserted to contain an inordinate number of gross misrepresentations and errors, all attempting to support their allegedly incorrect opinions about the Eastern Orthodox teaching on the toll-houses.

== See also ==
- Matarta in Mandaeism
- Bardo in Buddhism
- Life of Basil the Younger (Russian Wikipedia)
- Coptic Apocalypse of Paul, a Gnostic text
- Sefer HaRazim, a Jewish mystical text
