= Sefer HaRazim =

Jewish magical text

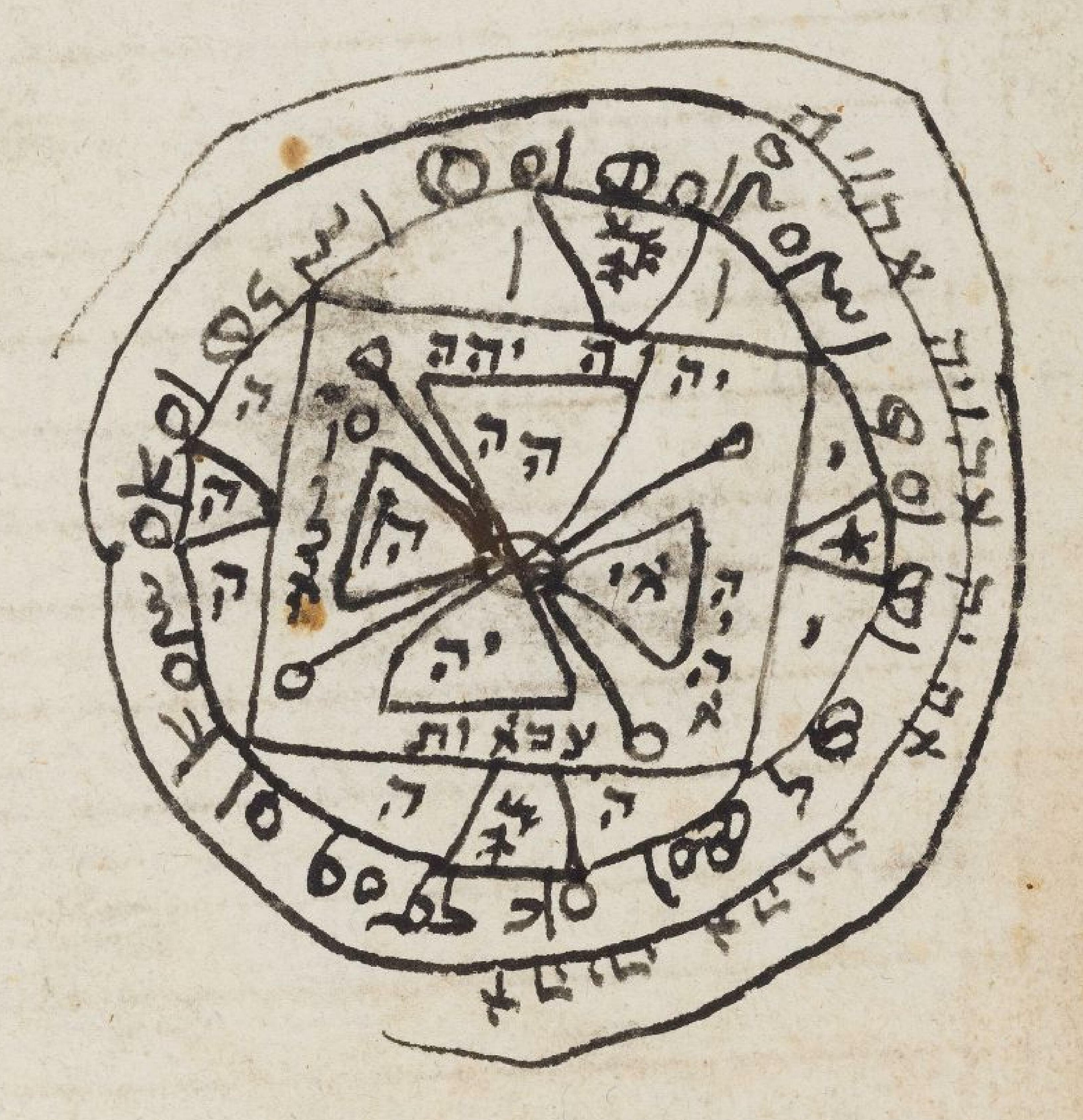
A diagram from a Sefer HaRazim manuscript

Sefer HaRazim (Hebrew: ספר הרזים; "Book of Secrets") is a Jewish magical text that dates to around the turn of the 4th century AD. According to the text's preface, it was given to Noah by the angel Raziel, and passed down throughout Biblical history until it ended up in the possession of Solomon, for whom it was a great source of his wisdom and purported magical powers. This is not the same work as the Sefer Raziel HaMalakh, which was given to Adam by the same angel, although both works stem from the same tradition; large parts of Sefer HaRazim were incorporated into the Sefer Raziel under its original title.

It is thought to be a sourcebook for Jewish magic, calling upon angels rather than God to perform supernatural feats.

== Etymology ==
The Hebrew title Sefer ha-Razim (ספר הרזים) means "Book of Secrets". The word raz (רז), meaning "secret" or "mystery", is of Iranian origin and is cognate with the modern Persian rāz, which has the same meaning. According to Shaul Shaked, the word entered Aramaic during the Achaemenid period, when Aramaic served as an administrative language of the Persian Empire, and subsequently spread to most later Aramaic dialects. The word also appears in the Aramaic portions of the Book of Daniel. In the Hebrew title, -im is the masculine plural ending, while ha- is the definite article.

== Discovery ==
The text was rediscovered in the 20th century by Mordecai Margalioth, a Jewish scholar visiting Oxford in 1963, using fragments found in the Cairo Geniza. He hypothesised that several fragments of Jewish magical literature shared a common source and was certain that he could reconstruct this common source. He achieved this in 1966 when he published Sefer HaRazim. The first English translation of the book was undertaken by Michael A. Morgan in 1983; the book has been in print since 2007. A new scholarly edition of the main extant manuscript including Hebrew and Judeo-Arabic Geniza fragments and a 13th-century Latin translation was prepared by Bill Rebiger and Peter Schäfer in 2009, along with a translation and commentary in German in a separate volume.

== Dating ==
Margalioth places the date of the original text to the early fourth or late third century CE. This date is almost universally accepted; a notable exception is Ithamar Gruenwald who dates the text to the sixth or seventh century. Nonetheless, it is clear that this text predates Kabbalistic texts, including the Zohar (thirteenth century), the Bahir (thirteenth century as well), and possibly the proto-Kabbalistic Sefer Yetzirah (fourth century). There are certain textual clues that point toward this early date, specifically the reference to "the Roman indictions in 1:27-28 [which] gives a clear terminus a quo of 297 CE".

== Structure and content ==
The book is split into seven sections, not including a preface which details the book's reception and transmission. Each of the first six sections corresponds to one heaven (or firmament) and contains a listing of angels and instructions to perform one or more magical rites. Only the throne of God and the four hayots are in the seventh heaven. The seven firmaments, each described with lengthy lists of angel names, are as follows. (The angel names are from Rebiger & Schäfer (2010).)

1. First Firmament: 7 encampments led by the angels Aurpnial, Tigrh, Dnhl, Klmial/Hlmia, Asimur, Psbr, and Bual.
2. Second Firmament: 12 steps, each with about 8–20 angels.
3. Third Firmament: 3 angelic princes, namely Ibnial, Rhṭial, and Dlqial.
4. Fourth Firmament: angelic princes who lead the sun during the day and night (about 30 princes during the day, and about 30 princes during the night).
5. Fifth Firmament: 12 princes of glory who represent the 12 months. They are Šˁpial (month of Nisan), Rghil (month of Iyyar), Dirnaur (month of Siwan), Tˁnṣun (month of Tammuz), Tdnrgar (month of Av), Mural (month of Elul), Phrrun (month of Tishre), Ildng (month of Marḥeshwan), Anrgnur (month of Kislew), Mpnial (month of Ṭevet), Ḥšbdrum (month of Shevaṭ), and Abrkial (month of Adar).
6. Sixth Firmament: heads of the encampments in the east (with 28 angelic leaders and their encampments) and west (with 31 angelic leaders and their encampments). The heads of the encampments are Aparkm (in the west) and Tuqpirs (in the east).
7. Seventh Firmament: throne of God and 4 hayots

There is an uneasy tension between the orthodox cosmogony of the book and the unorthodox praxeis embodied in these magical rites; the book has obviously been edited by a rabbinical scribe, but the "popular religion" contained in the book is more or less intact. Some of the rituals purport to facilitate healing, prophecy, an attack upon one's enemy, and gaining good fortune. The number seven, the importance of divine names, and the prevalence of sympathetic magic all have significance in the literature of Middle Eastern magic. The text demonstrates strong syncretism of Jewish and Greek traditions; an example is a prayer to the sun god Helios to invoke him at night:

Holy Helios, who rises in the east, good mariner, trustworthy leader of the sun's rays, reliable witness, who of old didst establish the mighty wheel of the heavens, holy orderer, ruler of the axis of heaven, Lord, Brilliant Leader, King, Soldier. I, N son of N, present my supplication before you, that you will appear to me without causing me fear, and you will be revealed to me without causing me terror, and you will conceal nothing from me, and will tell me truthfully all that I desire.

The prayer is preceded by instructions to call on several angels 21 times as well as the name of the sun. The reader is told to perform the ritual in white garments.

The Mandaean uthra (angel or guardian) Ptahil is mentioned as Ptḥiʾl (Hebrew: פתחיאל) in Sefer HaRazim, listed among other angels who stand on the ninth step of the second firmament.

== See also ==
- Ancient Jewish magic
- Bahir
- Semiphoras and Schemhamphorash
- Matarta in Mandaeism
- Aerial toll house in Eastern Orthodox Christianity
- Coptic Apocalypse of Paul, a Gnostic text

== Sources ==
- Levy, B. Barry. Sepher Ha-Razim, Unpublished manuscript and English translation, McGill University.
- Margalioth, Mordecai. Sepher Ha-Razim. Jerusalem: Yediot Achronot, 1966.
- Morgan, Michael A. Sepher Ha-Razim: The Book of Mysteries. Chico, CA: Scholars Press, 1983.
- Rebiger, Bill; Schäfer, Peter (eds.). Sefer ha-Razim I und II. Das Buch der Geheimnisse, vol. 1: Edition, vol. 2: Einleitung, Übersetzung und Kommentar. Tübingen: Mohr Siebeck, 2009. ISBN 9783161514654. (in German)
