= Matarta =

Watch-house or purgatory in Mandaean cosmology

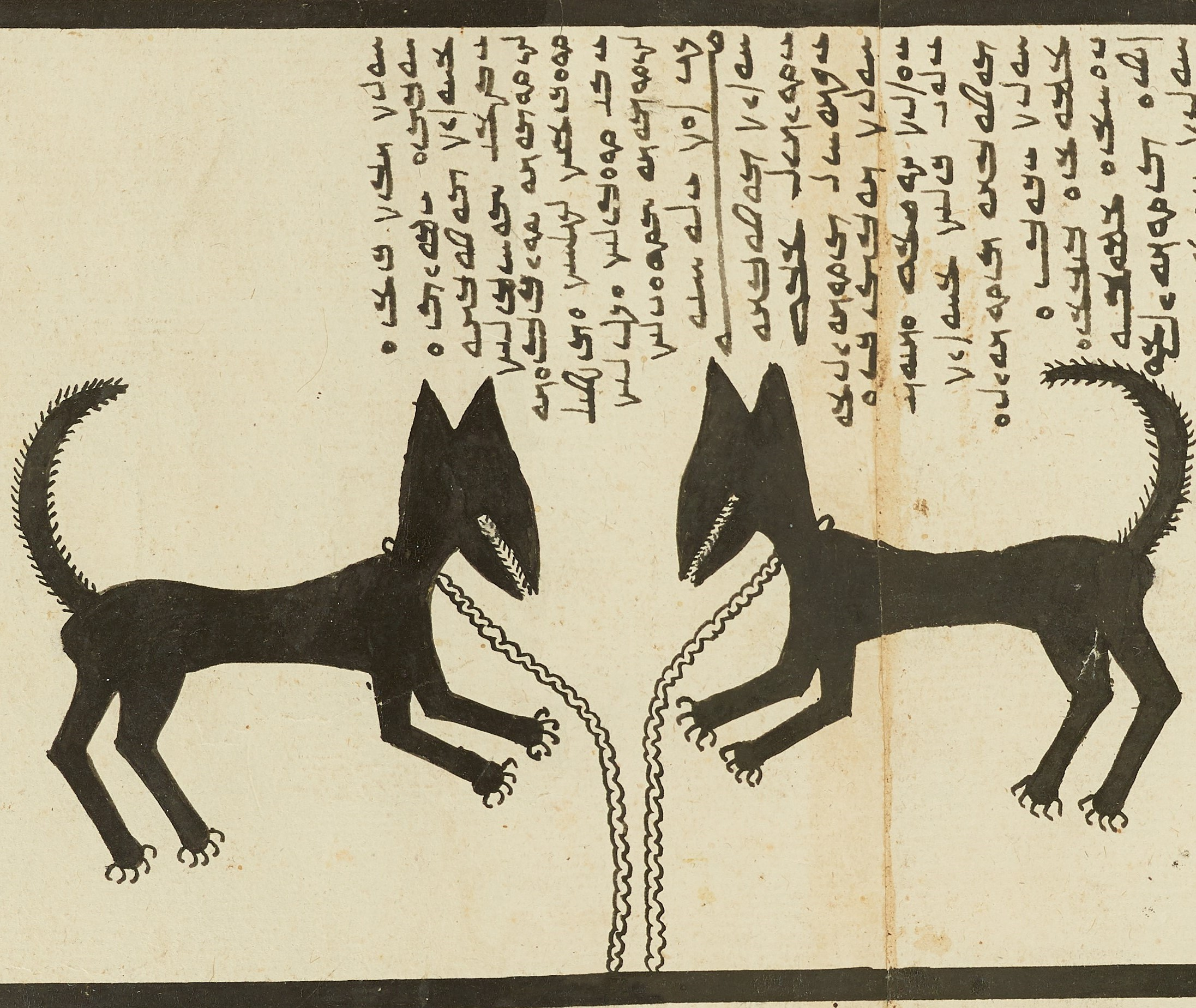
Drawing of two wolves in the maṭarta of Nbu. From the Scroll of Abatur (MS DC 8).

In Mandaean cosmology, a maṭarta (Classical Mandaic: ࡌࡀࡈࡀࡓࡕࡀ; plural form: maṭarata ࡌࡀࡈࡀࡓࡀࡕࡀ) is a "station" or "toll house" that is located between the World of Light (alma ḏ-nhūra) from Tibil (Earth). It has variously been translated as "watch-station", "toll-station", "way-station", or "purgatory". Maṭartas are guarded by various uthras (celestial beings from the World of Light) and demons. Ruha, the queen of the underworld, is the ruler or guardian of one of the maṭartas.

To reach the World of Light (alma ḏ-nhūra) from Tibil (Earth), souls must pass through the various maṭartas that are situated in between. Rituals such as the masiqta can help guide souls past the various maṭarta so that they could reach the World of Light.

== In the Ginza Rabba ==
In the Ginza Rabba, Chapter 3 in Book 5 of the Right Ginza, Book 6 of the Right Ginza (also known as the "Book of Dinanukht"), and Chapter 4 in Book 1 of the Left Ginza give detailed descriptions of the maṭartas.

Some of the matarta guards are:

- Nbaz (Nbaz Haila)
- Nbu (Mercury)
- Zan-Haza-Zban
- Yur (Yur-Yahur)
- Arhum
- Pilpin-Pipin
- Jesus the Messiah (ʿšu Mšiha / Īšu Mšiha)
- Ruha
- Himun
- Ptahil
- Abatur

Order of matarta guards in Right Ginza 5.3:

1. the Virgin (ptula)
2. Zan-Hazazban
3. Yur, Yahur, and Arhum
4. Pilpin-Pipin
5. Jesus the Messiah
6. the userers
7. Ruha ḏ-Qudša

Order of matarta guards in Right Ginza 6:

1. Nbaz-Haila
2. Zan-Hazazban
3. Ewat-Ruha
4. Himun
5. Ptahil
6. Abatur

Order of matarta guards in Left Ginza 1.4:

1. Nbaz and the clergy
2. Nbu and the scribes
3. Seven of Ptahil and the sinners
4. userers
5. The Messiah (Jesus) and the celibates
6. Ewat (i.e., Ruha) and the fasting hypocrites
7. Ptahil and the wicked rulers
8. Abatur and the unobservant Naṣoraeans

Left Ginza 3.51 is about the soul passing through seven matarta stations. The names of the matarta guards are simply the "First," "Second," "Third," "Fourth," "Fifth," "Sixth," and "Seventh," respectively.

== Parallels in other religions ==
In the Nag Hammadi library, the Coptic Apocalypse of Paul describes an ascent through the seven lower heavens, which are guarded by various angels inflicting punishments on sinners. Heavenly "toll collectors" are mentioned in the First Apocalypse of James (33,2-27), which mentions "three detainers who carry off souls by theft," as well as angels torturing the soul in the Book of Thomas the Contender (141,36-39) and Pistis Sophia.

In Zostrianos, a Sethian text in the Nag Hammadi library, the Aeonic Copies form a lower realm or purgatory containing the orbiting planets and probably also the fixed stars.

Matartas in Mandaeism are also similar to aerial toll houses (Bulgarian: митарство; Russian: мытарства) in Eastern Orthodox Christianity. (The aforementioned Slavic words are not cognate with the Mandaic word.)

The Second Book of Enoch, a Jewish apocryphal text written in the first century CE, describes the mystical ascent of the patriarch Enoch through a hierarchy of Ten Heavens. Enoch passes through the Garden of Eden in the Third Heaven on his way to meet the Lord face-to-face in the Tenth (chapter 22). Along the way he encounters vividly described populations of angels who torment wrongdoers; he sees homes, olive oil, and flowers.

== See also ==
- Aerial toll houses in Eastern Orthodox Christian theology
- Araf (Islam)
- Arcs of Descent and Ascent in Neoplatonism
- Astral plane
- Body of light
- Bardo in Buddhism
- Barzakh in Islam
- Chinvat Bridge in Zoroastrianism
- Dinanukht's heavenly ascension
- Gate deities of the underworld in ancient Egyptian religion
- Gehenna
- Hekhalot literature, which often contains heavenly ascent narratives
- Limbo in Roman Catholic theology
- Masiqta, a Mandaean ritual
- Seven Heavens

Apocryphal texts

- Coptic Apocalypse of Paul
- Ascension of Isaiah
- Book of Enoch
- 2 Enoch
- First Apocalypse of James
- Testament of Abraham
- Apocalypse of Abraham

Other texts

- Life of Basil the Younger (Russian Wikipedia)
- Sefer HaRazim
