= Theodore bar Konai =

8th century Syriac Christian exegete and apologist

Theodore Bar Konai (Syriac: ܬܐܕܘܪܘܣ ܒܪ ܟܘܢܝ) was a distinguished Syriac exegete and apologist of the Church of the East who seems to have flourished at the end of the eighth century. His most famous work was a book of scholia on the Old and New Testaments.

== Life and works ==
Bar Konai appears to have lived during the reign of Timothy I (780–823), Patriarch of the Church of the East, though some scholars have placed him a century later. Assemani identified him with a bishop named Theodore, the nephew of the patriarch Yohannan IV (900–5), who was appointed to the diocese of Lashom in Beth Garmaï in 893, and his dating was followed by Wright. Chabot and Baum and Winkler, however, both place him at the end of the eighth century.

=== Book of the Scholion ===
Theodore was the author of the Scholion (Kṯāḇā d-ʾeskoliyon), a set of scholia on both the Old and New Testaments (edited between 1908 and 1912 by the celebrated scholar Addai Scher), believed to have been written circa 792. The Scholia offer an apologetic presentation in nine chapters, similar to a catechism, of East Syrian Christianity, and contain a valuable overview, in a tenth and eleventh chapter, of heretical doctrines and non-Christian religions such as Zoroastrianism, Manichaeism, Mandaeism, and Islam, with which Theodore sharply disagreed.

Theodore, c. 792 in the Book of the Scholion, mentions the Mandaean uthras Abatur (Abitur) and Ptahil (Ptaḥil) (cf. Right Ginza 15.13; 18), Hamgai and Hamgagai (cf. Right Ginza 15.5), as well as Dinanukht ("Dinanus" or Dynnws) and Diṣā (cf. Right Ginza 6). He considers the founder of Mandaeism to be a man called Ado from Adiabene. Ado's brothers are named as Šilmai, Nidbai, Bar-Ḥayye, Abi-zkā, Kušṭai, and Sethel (Štʾyl). Theodore writes that the followers of Ado's religion are known as Mandaeans or Mašknaeans in Meshan (around present-day Basra), and as Nāṣrāye, Adonaeans (or Adoites), and Dostaeans in Bet Arāmāye (i.e., Asoristan, around Ctesiphon in central Mesopotamia).

=== Other works ===
Theodore was also the author of an ecclesiastical history, a treatise against Monophysitism, a treatise against the Arianism, a colloquy between a pagan and a Christian, and a treatise on heresies. His Church History contains some interesting details of the lives of the Patriarchs of the Church of the East. He is the latest author to mention Gilgamesh before his rediscovery in the 19th century. He lists him twice in somewhat garbled forms, as tenth and twelfth in a list of twelve kings who reigned between Peleg and Abraham.
