= Nbu =

Planet Mercury in Mandaeism

ʿNbu
- Member of the Seven Planets
- Other names: Maqurpiil, Mšiha, ʿaṭarid
- Affiliation: Jesus and Christianity scribes and Dinanukht
- Abode: World of Darkness
- Planet: Mercury
- Parents: Ruha and Ur

Equivalents
- Akkadian: Nabu

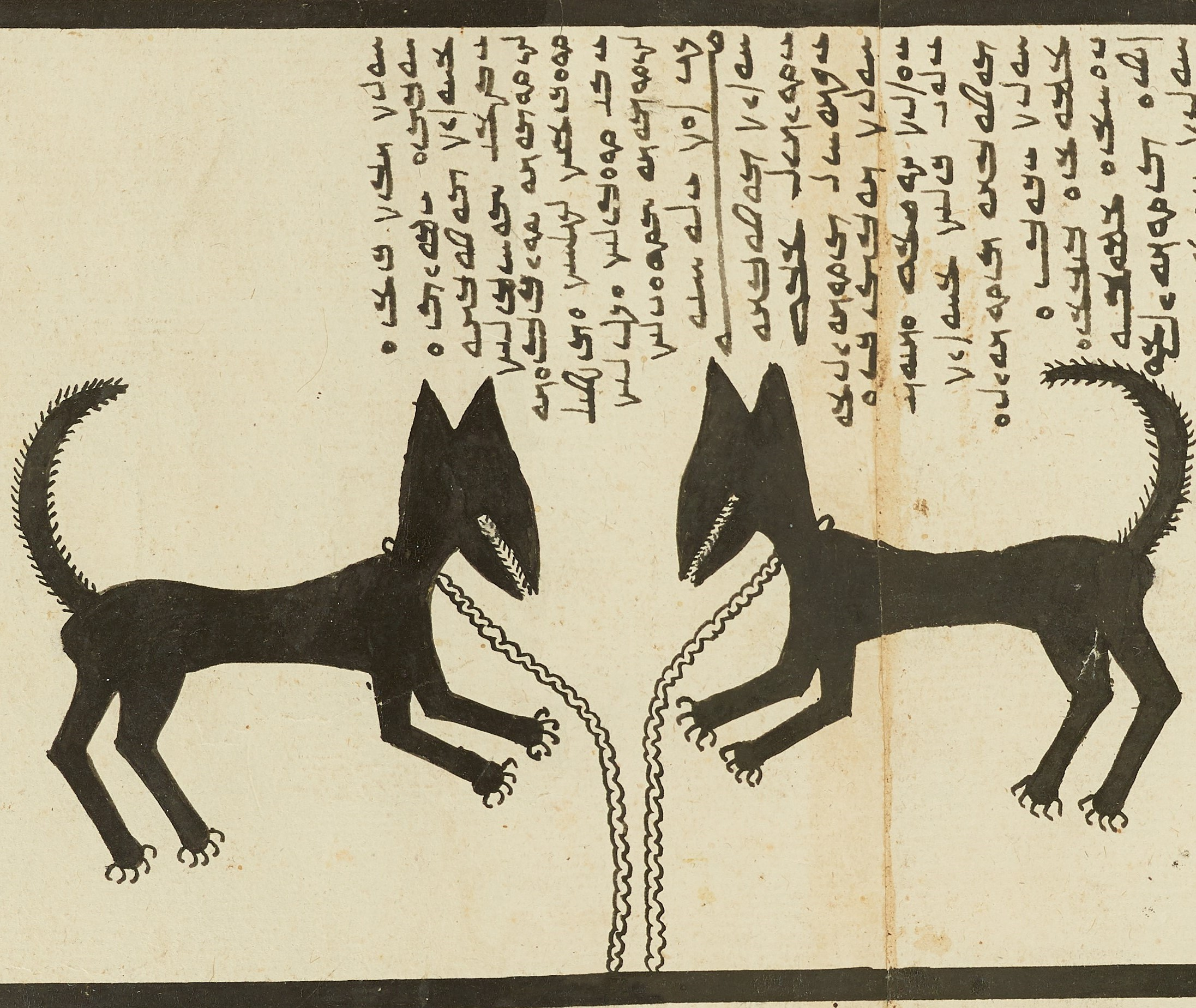
Drawing of two wolves in the maṭarta of Nbu. From the Scroll of Abatur (MS DC 8).

In Mandaeism, ʿNbu (Classical Mandaic: ࡏࡍࡁࡅ), Nbu, or Enbu is the Mandaic name for the planet Mercury. Nbu is one of the seven planets (Classical Mandaic: ࡔࡅࡁࡀ, romanized: šuba, lit. 'The Seven'), who are part of the entourage of Ruha in the World of Darkness. This name was borrowed from the Mesopotamian god called Nabu.

Nbu is associated with learning and scribes, as well as Jesus and Christianity. For example, in Qulasta prayer 210 and Right Ginza 1.4, Nbu is described as "learned and wise" (Classical Mandaic: ࡎࡀࡐࡓࡀ ࡅࡄࡀࡊࡉࡌࡀ, romanized: sapra u-hakima). Other names for Nbu include Maqurpiil, Mšiha (i.e., Jesus the Messiah), and ʿaṭarid (of Arabic origin). Nbu's name is derived from the Akkadian Nabû.

Buckley (2010) suggests a connection between Dinanukht and Nbu. For instance, in the Zrazta ḏ-Hibil Ziwa (Drower Collection Ms. 44), Nbu is the Lord of Books, Ink, and Wisdom. Similarly, Dinanukht is called the "ink-book of the gods" (Mandaic: spar diuta ḏ-alahia) in Right Ginza 6.
