= Jesus in Mandaeism =

Jesus as portrayed in Mandaeism

Jesus (Ešu Mšiha)
- Other names: Jesus the Messiah (Classical Mandaic: ࡏࡔࡅ ࡌࡔࡉࡄࡀ, romanized: Ešu Mšiha); Messiah (Classical Mandaic: ࡌࡔࡉࡄࡀ, romanized: Mšiha)
- Symbol: Nbu (Mercury)
- Parents: Miriai (mother)

Equivalents
- Christian: Jesus
- Islamic: ʿĪsā ibn Maryam

In Mandaeism, Jesus (Classical Mandaic: ࡏࡔࡅ ࡌࡔࡉࡄࡀ, romanized: Ešu Mšiha, lit. 'Jesus the Messiah') or Mšiha (Classical Mandaic: ࡌࡔࡉࡄࡀ, romanized: Mšiha, lit. 'Messiah'; Modern Mandaic: Emšihā) is mentioned in Mandaean texts such as the Ginza Rabba, Mandaean Book of John, and Haran Gawaita. Mandaeans consider Miriai, a convert from Judaism to Mandaeism, to be the mother of Jesus, although her son is considered to be a false prophet.

== Spellings ==
The Mandaic name for "Jesus the Messiah" can be romanized as ʿšu Mšiha, Īšu Mšiha, or Ešu Mšiha due to varying transliterations of the Mandaic letter ࡏ. Mšiha can also be spelled Mshiha.

The Syriac equivalent in the Peshitta (e.g., in John 1:17) is Išuᶜ Mšiḥa (Classical Syriac: ܝܫܘܥ ܡܫܝܚܐ; with vowel signs: Yešūᶜ Məšīḥā ܝܶܫܽܘܥ ܡܫܺܝܚܳܐ).

== In Mandaean texts ==
In the Mandaean Book of John, Anush, an uthra from the World of Light who may be identified with Enosh, engages Jesus in dialogues and preaching competitions in Jerusalem. In Mandaean texts, Jesus is typically portrayed as a false prophet who is not to be followed.

In Right Ginza 2.1 (Book 2, Part 1), Jesus is associated with Nbu (the planet Mercury) and Orpheus (Mandaic: aurus). In Right Ginza 5.3, Jesus is also portrayed as one of the matarta guards, as he plays the role of a shepherd leading a congregation of souls resembling a flock of sheep.

== See also ==
- Jesuism
- Jesus in Manichaeism
- Jesus in Islam
