= Coptic Apocalypse of Paul =

Gnostic apocalyptic text

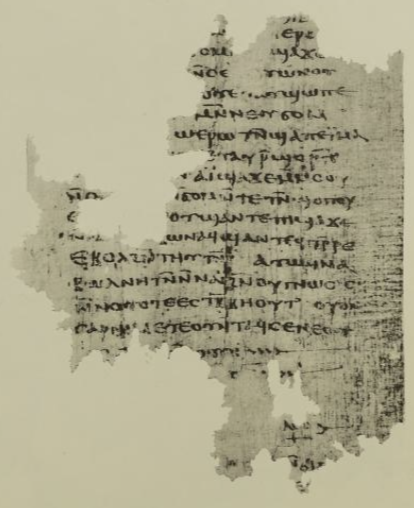
Codex V of the Nag Hammadi library, p. 17, featuring the start of the Apocalypse of Paul. The page is damaged and parts are unreadable.

The Coptic Apocalypse of Paul (Sahidic Coptic: ⲧⲁⲡⲟⲕⲁⲗⲩⲯⲓⲥ ⲙ̄ⲡⲁⲩⲗⲟⲥ), also known as the Revelation of Paul, is a Gnostic apocalyptic text. It was originally written in Koine Greek, but the surviving manuscript is a Coptic language translation. It is the second of five treatises in Codex V of the Nag Hammadi library texts.

The text describes a Gnostic cosmogony and interpretation of Pauline epistles via its portrayal of Paul the Apostle as an apocalyptic hero. The content of the text can be divided into three parts: an epiphany scene, a scene of judgment and punishment, and a heavenly journey in which Paul ultimately ascends to the tenth level of heaven. The author was likely influenced by 2 Corinthians 12, where Paul says he knew of a man who went to the third heaven; the work presumes this man was Paul himself, and expands the journey to all of the layers of heaven. Several scholars have argued that the ideas presented in the text are consistent with Valentinianism.

== History ==
The text was discovered in Nag Hammadi, Egypt in 1945 as part of the Nag Hammadi library, a collection of 13 codices. The codices had been buried around 400 AD. The writing is a Coptic translation of a Greek original. Scholars have differing estimates on the date of authorship of the original Greek text, ranging from the late-second century to the fourth century.

The first 12 lines of the text are either missing or extensively damaged. There are also gaps at the top and bottom of each page, but some of the text can be reconstructed. The work is found on pages 17–24 of the codex.

While the library was discovered in 1945, it was not until 1975 that images of Codex V were published and available to the public. Along with the rest of the works in the Nag Hammadi library, the text was translated into English and published in The Nag Hammadi Library in English in 1977. The publication was part of the work of the Coptic Gnostic Library Project, which began in 1966 at Claremont Graduate University. George W. MacRae and William R. Murdock translated the text to English. Michael Kaler published an additional English translation in 2008.

== Contents ==
Paul asks a little child for directions to Jerusalem. The child requests Paul's name to show him the way. The child knows who Paul is and wants to find an excuse to talk more. The child reveals that Paul is blessed and has been called to Jerusalem to meet his fellow apostles. The child claims to be the accompanying Spirit and urges Paul to awaken his mind. The child concludes the speech by mentioning powers, authorities, and demons. The child says that Paul is standing on the mountain of Jericho, and connects this to seeing hidden truths. Then the child tells Paul to go meet the twelve apostles.

The Holy Spirit lifts up Paul to the third and fourth heavens. Paul looks down and sees individuals on Earth, and the twelve apostles are at his sides. In the fourth heaven, Paul witnesses angelic beings resembling gods. The angels bring a soul from the realm of the dead and whip it. The soul questions the reason for its suffering. A toll collector responds by condemning its lawless actions.

The soul challenges the toll collector to present witnesses and evidence of its deeds, and a divine courtroom of sorts occurs. Three witnesses arrive. The first witness claims to have caused the soul anger and envy. The second witness accuses the soul of murder. The third witness claims to have granted darkness so the soul could sin. The soul feels sorrow and is cast down. It inhabits a prepared body as the witnesses conclude. The Spirit calls Paul to proceed, and the gate opens to the fifth heaven.

In the fifth heaven, a great angel holds an iron rod. Three other angels are also present, competing with each other and wielding whips to urge souls towards judgment. Paul proceeds with the Spirit, and the gate opens for him. Paul advances to the sixth heaven. He sees his fellow apostles while being led by the Holy Spirit. A radiant light shines upon the sixth heaven. Paul addresses the toll collector in the sixth heaven, and the toll collector lets Paul pass.

In the seventh heaven, Paul encounters an old man who has a throne that surpasses the Sun's brightness by sevenfold. He asks Paul about his destination. Paul says that he is going to the place from which he came. The old man asks where he is from, and Paul responds that he is going down to the world of the dead to release captives from Babylon's captivity. The old man questions how Paul will escape him. The Spirit advises Paul to show the old man a sign. Paul gives the sign, and the old man turns his face downward toward his creation and authorities.

The seventh heaven opens, and Paul goes up to the Ogdoad. He sees the twelve apostles who greet him, and Paul ascends to the ninth heaven. Paul greets everyone there and continues to the tenth heaven, where he greets his fellow spirits.

== Analysis ==
Lautaro Roig Lanzillotta examines the cosmological framework of the text. The text divides the cosmos into the material world, the celestial realm (up to the seventh heaven), and the divine realm (the Ogdoad, ninth heaven, and tenth heaven). Roig Lanzillotta believes that the apostles accompany Paul only to the top of the celestial realm, since Paul is portrayed as a higher Gnostic authority than they are. The apostles' authority is limited to serving the demiurge, who appears in the text as the old man in the seventh heaven. The neutral description of the old man indicates that he represents the God of Judaism and non-Gnostic Christianity, but he is considered an inferior creator deity by Gnostics. The text's description of the divine realm is minimal because its importance comes from its hierarchical position, placing the intellect above the passions.

In a study comparing Valentinianism in the text with the First Apocalypse of James, Eirini Bergström outlines the role of the toll collectors. She notes that while the toll collectors act as both judge and gatekeeper, Paul is allowed to pass through the fourth and fifth heavens as an observer before speaking with the toll collector in the sixth heaven. Gatekeepers in Egyptian mythology guarded the doors to the underworld and punished souls. Souls had to provide correct words to pass. Bergström states that the toll collectors are ignorant rather than evil since they incorrectly believe that the demiurge whom they serve is the true God.

In the text, Paul stands on the "mountain of Jericho," which does not exist. Jean-Marc Rosenstiehl hypothesizes that it is Mount Nebo (near the city of Jericho), based on an unrelated Egyptian apocryphon that also makes reference to a "mountain of Jericho." Michael Kaler considers Rosenstiehl's idea extremely speculative. Matthew Twigg rejects Rosenstiehl's theory and proposes instead that the "mountain of Jericho" is an allegory for overcoming the devil of the material world.

While the Coptic Apocalypse and the better-known Visio Pauli have little in common, they do have one similar scene. In the fourth heaven, there is a courtroom scene where a soul is judged, and the (non-Gnostic) Apocalypse of Paul also features the judging of souls with evidence brought by angels as a major theme. Monika Pesthy compared the scenes, and writes that in the Coptic work, the ultimate destiny of souls is not a matter of interest, unlike the Visio Pauli. Rather, for Pesthy, it is more part of describing the phases and dangers of Paul's journey (and by extension other Christians' journeys), describing the mystic ascension of the soul toward higher realms via spiritual development. Given that the "punishment" is simply the soul returning to a body, it makes the scene more about intermediary foibles that can be improved during life.

Other scholars have also analyzed the court scene, and come to differing conclusions. Hans-Josef Klauck suggests that the entire scene is an interpolation or later addition, given that it could be removed without changing the overall tenor of the story. Rodolphe Kasser suggests that the scene is inspired by Egyptian cultural beliefs, such as a possible allusion to the Egyptian Book of the Dead. Murdock and McRae see syncretism and multiple influences, including Jewish apocalypses such as the Testament of Abraham; Greek mythology such as the angel whipping a soul; and Babylonian astrology.

Jacques van der Vliet questions the scholarly consensus on the basis, doctrine, and dating of the text. While he accepts the obvious intertextuality with 2 Corinthians 12, he believes Galatians 1–2 should also be considered as primary intertext. This interpretation shifts the focus to Paul's mission and relationship with the apostles. Van der Vliet likewise acknowledges the Valentinian ideas in the text but considers them residual traces of the movement rather than definitive proof of being written in the second century. Van der Vliet instead believes the text dates to the fourth century, based on the interest in apocalyptic literature and Paul at that time.

Van der Vliet's writing is partially in response to the views of Michael Kaler. Kaler argues that the text takes the Valentinian side of a debate between Christians, whereas Against Heresies (written c. 180 AD by Irenaeus) takes the anti-Valentinian side. According to Kaler, the sides disagreed about the nature of the heavenly realms, and both sides sought to use the authority of Paul to legitimize their respective viewpoints. Since Paul mentions only the third heaven in 2 Corinthians 12, the Gnostics would have to show that Paul ascended higher.

== See also ==
- Life of Basil the Younger (Russian Wikipedia)
- Aerial toll house in Eastern Orthodox Christianity
- Matarta in Mandaeism

== Bibliography ==
Translations

- Kaler, Michael (2008). Flora Tells a Story: The Apocalypse of Paul and Its Contexts. Études sur le christianisme et le judaïsme 19. Wilfrid Laurier University Press. ISBN 978-1-55458-282-2.
- MacRae, George W.; Murdock, William R.; Parrott, Douglas M. (1981). Robinson, James M. (ed.). The Nag Hammadi Library in English. San Francisco: Harper & Row. pp. 239–241. ISBN 9780060669294.
- Meyer, Marvin W.; Robinson, James MacConkey (1977). The Nag Hammadi Library in English. Brill. ISBN 978-90-04-05434-9.
- Murdock, William R.; MacRae, George W. (1979). "NHC V,2: The Apocalypse of Paul". Nag Hammadi Codices V, 2-5 and VI with Papyrus Berolinensis 8502, 1 And 4. Boston: Brill. pp. 47–63. doi:10.1163/9789004438859_009. ISBN 9789004438859.

Articles and books

- Bergström, Eirini (2019). A comparative study of the Apocalypse of Paul (NHC V, 2) and the First Apocalypse of James (NHC V, 3 & TC 2) (PDF) (Master thesis). Mid Sweden University.
- Domeracki, Michael S. (2017). "The Apocalypse of Paul (NHC V,2) as a Valentinian Baptismal Liturgy of Ascent". Gnosis: Journal of Gnostic Studies. 2 (2): 212–234. doi:10.1163/2451859X-12340037.
- Kaler, Michael; Painchaud, Louis; Bussieres, Marie-Pierre (2004). "The Coptic Apocalypse of Paul, Irenaeus' Adversus Haereses 2.30.7, and the Second-Century Battle for Paul's Legacy". Journal of Early Christian Studies. 12 (2): 173–193. doi:10.1353/earl.2004.0024. hdl:20.500.11794/365. S2CID 55606637.
- Kaler, Michael (2005). "Contextualizing the Apocalypse of Paul" (PDF). Laval théologique et philosophique. 61 (2): 241–245. doi:10.7202/011815ar.
- Roig Lanzillotta, Lautaro (2016). "The Apocalypse of Paul (NHC V,2): Cosmology, Anthropology, and Ethics" (PDF). Gnosis: Journal of Gnostic Studies. 1 (1–2): 110–131. doi:10.1163/2451859X-12340007. ISSN 2451-8581.
- Pesthy, Monika (2007). "Earthly Tribunal in the Fourth Heaven (NHC V,2 20,5 - 21,22)". In Bremmer, Jan N.; Czachesz, István (eds.). The Visio Pauli and the Gnostic Apocalypse of Paul. Studies on Early Christian Apocrypha 9. Leuven: Peeters. pp. 198–210. ISBN 9789042918511.
- Twigg, Matthew (2015). "The Mountain of Jericho in the Nag Hammadi Apocalypse of Paul: A Suggestion". Vigiliae Christianae. 69 (4): 422–442. doi:10.1163/15700720-12341219. ISSN 1570-0720.
- Twigg, Matthew (2022). The Valentinian Temple: Visions, Revelations, and the Nag Hammadi Apocalypse of Paul. Routledge. ISBN 978-1-000-56868-4.
- van den Broek, Roelof (2013). Gnostic Religion in Antiquity. New York: Cambridge University Press. p. 19. ISBN 978-1-107-03137-1.
- van der Vliet, Jacques (2022). "Paul and the Others: Rereading the Gnostic Apocalypse of Paul (NHC V, 2)". Gnosis: Journal of Gnostic Studies. 7 (2): 127–150. doi:10.1163/2451859X-00702001. S2CID 251784294.

Photographs of the codex

- Robinson, James M., ed. (1975). The Facsimile Edition of the Nag Hammadi Codices: Codex V. Leiden: Brill. ISBN 9004042059.
