= Dinanukht =

Mythological figure in Mandaeism

Dinanukht (also spelled Dinanukt or Dananukt; Classical Mandaic: ࡃࡉࡍࡀࡍࡅࡊࡕ or ࡃࡀࡍࡀࡍࡅࡊࡕ; from Persian 'the one who speaks in accordance with the religion') is a mythological character in the Ginza Rabba, one of the main religious scriptures of Mandaeism, who is portrayed as an anthropomorphic book. Book 6 of the Right Ginza describes his ascension to the World of Light.

Buckley (2010) suggests a connection with Nbu (Mercury), who is associated with scribes and books. For instance, in the Zrazta ḏ-Hibil Ziwa (Drower Collection Ms. 44), Nbu is the Lord of Book and ink and wisdom. Similarly, Dinanukht is called the "ink-book of the gods" in Right Ginza 6.

== Spellings ==
Petermann spells the name as Dinanukt, while Lidzbarski spells it as Dinanukht. However, the Mhatam Yuhana Ginza from Ahvaz, Iran, which Gelbert (2011) is based on, spells it as Dananukt.

In the Book of the Scholion (written c. 792), the Syriac Christian writer Theodore bar Konai briefly mentions Dinanukht, which he spells as Dynnws (Classical Syriac: ܕܝܢܢܘܣ).

"Also they speak concerning Dinanus (Dynnws), the scribe of religions, and Little Diṣā."

== Story in the Ginza Rabba ==
Dinanukht, who is half-man, half-book (Classical Mandaic: ࡎࡐࡀࡓ, romanized: spar, sfar), unsuccessfully tries to destroy Diṣai, another half-man, half-book, by burning and drowning (Classical Mandaic: ࡈࡌࡀࡔࡕࡇ, romanized: țmaštḥ, lit. 'performed tamasha on him') when he is disturbed by his speech. However, Ewath (an epithet for Ruha) soon appears to repeat this speech, which is reminiscent of the Nag Hammadi Gnostic poem The Thunder, Perfect Mind. Torgny Säve-Söderbergh (1949) also noted similarities with Psalms of Thomas 14, in which Hylē provides an answer of co-existing opposites (e.g., "death and life").

Then Ewath, the holy spirit [Ruha ḏ-Qudsha], approached me in my Škīnā and said to me, (u-atat ʿuat ruha ḏ-qudša b-škinatai qaimalia u-amr alia)
"Why did you lie there, Dīnānūkht? (mahu škibit dananukt)
Why did you like the sleep? (mahu šinta hnatalak)
I am the Life that was from time immemorial, (ana hu hiia ḏ-hun mn l-aqadmia)
I am the Kušṭā that was before in the beginning. (ana hu kušṭa ḏ-hua mn qudam briša)
I am the radiance (ziwa), I am the light. (ana hu ziua, ana hu nhura)
I am the death, I am the Life. (ana hu muta, ana hu hiia)
I am the darkness, I am the light. (ana hu hšuka, ana hu nhura)
I am the error, I am the truth. (ana hu ṭʿia, ana hu šrara)
I am the destruction, I am the construction. (ana hu hbila, ana hu biniana)
I am the blow, I am the healing. (ana hu mhita, ana hu asuta)
I am the exalted man, who is older (ana hu gabra iatira ḏ-qašiš)
and was there earlier than the builder of heaven and earth. (mn qudam ḏ-bania ʿšumia u-arqa hua)
I have no comrade among kings, (habrai b-malkia laiit)
and there is no other crown in my kingdom. (u-laiit taga b-malkutai)
There is not a single person who could give me a notice (u-laiit kul ʿniš br anaša ḏ-paršigna naitilia)
in the misty clouds of darkness. (b-rpilia ḏ-hšuka)"

— Right Ginza, Book 6 (Wikisource; Mandaic transcription from Gelbert (2021))

Din Mlikh, an uthra, then leads Dinanukht past six different maṭartas (watch-houses) as he ascends to the World of Light:

1. the maṭarta of Nbaz-Haila
2. the maṭarta of Zan-Haza-Zban
3. the maṭarta of Ewath-Ruha (a compound name combining the epithet Ewath with its synonymous name Ruha)
4. the maṭarta of Himun
5. the maṭarta of Ptahil
6. the maṭarta of Abatur

Each time Dinanukht starts his ascension to one of the maṭartas, the text begins with the poetic refrain:

Winds, winds take Dīnānūkht away, (ziqia ziqia nasbilḥ l-dananukt)
storms, storms drive him away, (ʿudamia ʿudamia mdabrilḥ)
ladders, ladders carry him aloft (siblia siblia sablilḥ)
and make him rise on rungs. (u-ʿl dirgia masqilḥ)

— Right Ginza, Book 6 (Wikisource; Mandaic transcription from Gelbert (2021))

Dinanukht sees many wondrous things and then returns to earth, where his wife, Nuraita (also the name of Noah's wife in Book 18), thinks that he has become insane when Dinanukht tells her that he wants his books to be burned and drowned (see also divine madness). Dinanukht then proceeds to burn and drown the books himself. He continues to live on Tibil for 65 more years as he serves religious duties ordains priests. After Dinanukht's life on earth is over, he finally ascends to the World of Light.

== See also ==
- Nbu (Mercury), who is associated with scribes and books
- Matarta
- Utnapishtim
