= Borsippa =

Ancient Babylonian city

- Birs Nimrud
- Location within Iraq
- 32°23′31.19″N 44°20′30.08″E
- Type: settlement
- Location: Babylon Governorate, Iraq

Site notes
- Excavation dates: 1854, 1879-1881, 1902, 1980-2003, 2023-present
- Archaeologists: Henry Creswicke Rawlinson, Hormuzd Rassam, Robert Koldewey, Helga Piesl-Trenkwalder, Wilfred Allinger-Csollich, Sandra Heinsch, Walter Kuntner
- Condition: Ruined
- Owner: Public
- Public access: Yes

Borsippa (Sumerian: BAD.SI.(A).AB.BA^{KI} or Birs Nimrud, having been identified with Nimrod) is an archeological site in Babylon Governorate, Iraq, built on both sides of a lake about 17.7 km (11.0 mi) southwest of Babylon on the east bank of the Euphrates. It lies 15 kilometers from the ancient site of Dilbat.

It is today one of the most vividly identifiable surviving ziggurats, identified in the later Arabic culture with the Tower of Babel due to King Nebuchadnezzar referring to it as the "Tower of Borsippa" or "tongue tower", as stated in the stele recovered on site in the 19th century. However, modern scholarship concludes that the Babylonian builders of the ziggurat erected it as a religious edifice in honour of the local god Nabu, called the "son" of Babylon's Marduk, as would be appropriate for Babylon's lesser sister-city.

The tutelary god of Borsippa in the Ur III Empire in the late 3rd millennium BC was Tutu, who was syncretised with the god Marduk after the Old Babylonian period. Tutu was mentioned in the prologue of the Code of Hammurabi as the god of Borsippa. The goddesses Marat-E-zida and the god Mar-biti were also worshiped at Borsippa.

== History ==
In the late 3rd millennium BC a great revolt arose against Naram-Sin ruler of the Akkadian Empire. One of the rebelling cities mentioned in his inscriptions was BAR.KI which some researchers have taken as Borsippa, though this has been challenged. If it was Borsippa, then Ilum-dan was governor (ENSI) of the city at that time and Dannum was the "captain" (NU.BANDA).

During the reign of Ur III ruler Ibbi-Sin (c. 2028–2004 BC) it is known that the governor of Borsippa (and nearby Babylon) was Puzur-Tutu. These are the closing years of the Ur III empire. A text from the ruler of Kazallu states that Puzur-Tutu changed sides at the end and supported Išbi-Erra (c. 2017—1986 BC) ruler of Isin. An alternative reading of that text makes Puzur-Tutu governor of Bad-Ziabba, which may or may not be Borsippa, and has Išbi-Erra returning his city to Puzur-Tutu after his victory.

In the Old Babylonian period, Borsippa is known from year names of rulers of Babylon Sumu-la-El (c. 1880-1845 BC) "Year in which Sumulael entered Borsippa" and Apil-Sin (c. 1830–1813 BC) "Year Apil-Sin the king built the city wall of Borsippa". Borsippa was mentioned in the prologue of the Code of Hammurabi "... beloved of Tutu, the one who makes exult Borsippa, the pious one who does not fail in his duties to the Ezida temple ...". A later inscription of Hammurabi (c. 1792–1750 BC) dedicates Ezida to Marduk, the god of Babylon, showing Tutu, the tutelary god of Borsippa, being absorbed by Marduk. Ezida later became home of Nabu, son of Marduk.

In the Kassite period, Marduk-apla-iddina I (c. 1171–1159 BC), one of the last rulers of the Kassite dynasty of Babylon, rebuilt the E-Zida temple at Borsippa. Marduk-shapik-zeri (c. 1077–1065 BC), a ruler of the 2nd dynasty of Babylon, restored the E-Zida temple.

Borsippa is mentioned in the Babylonian Talmud (Shabbat 36a, Avodah Zarah 11b) and other rabbinic literature. Borsippa was dependent upon Babylon and was never the seat of a regional power. From the ninth century BC, Borsippa was on the borderland south of which lay the tribal "houses" of Chaldea.

The Jewish historian, Josephus, mentions the city in relation to the war between Cyrus the Great and Nabonidus. The temple to Nabu at Borsippa was destroyed in 484 BC during the suppression of a revolt against the Achaemenid emperor, Xerxes I.

In the 1st millennium BC, the city had a large scribal class.

== Archaeology ==
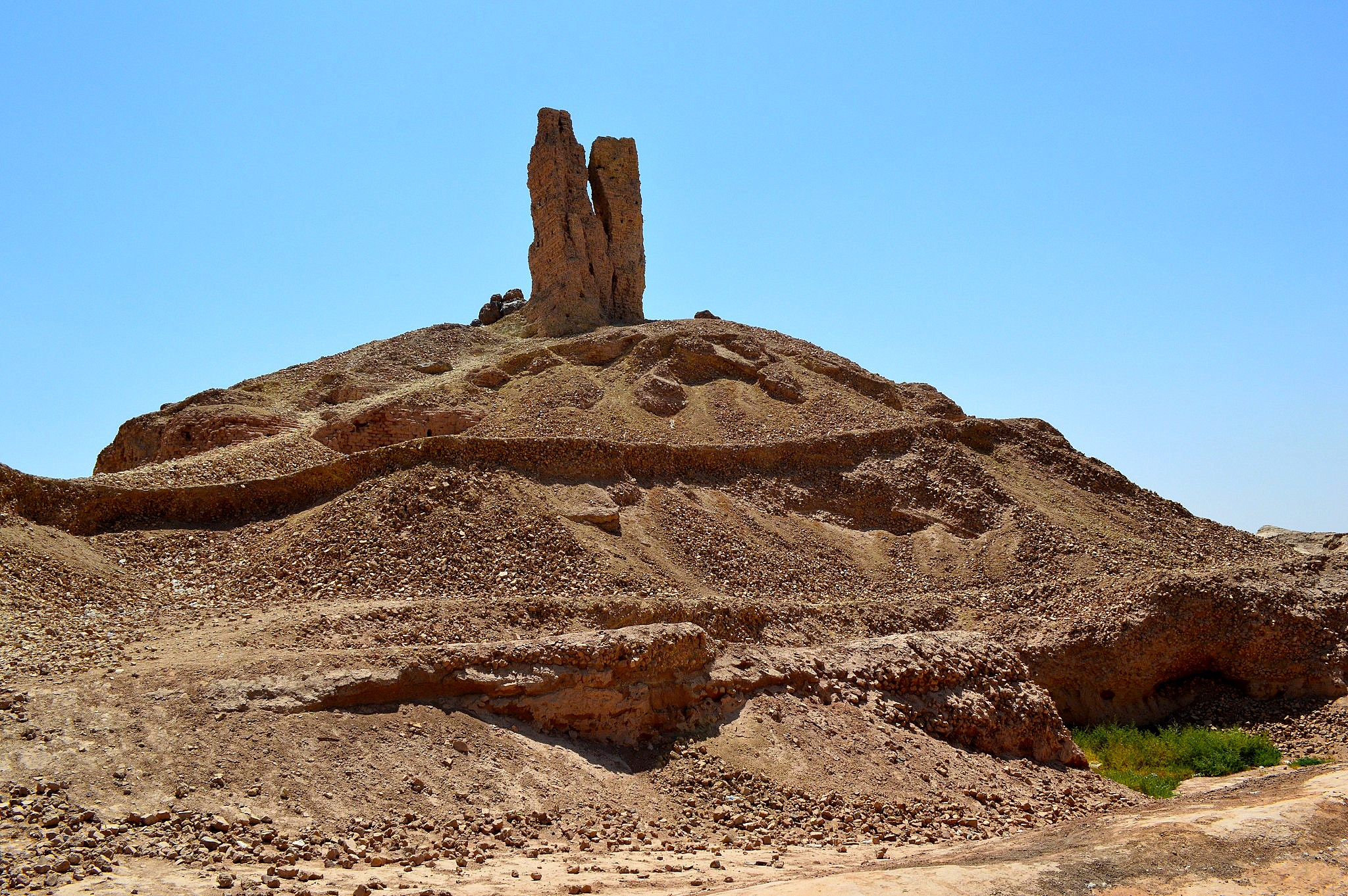
Ruins of the ziggurat and temple of the god Nabu at Borsippa, Babel Governorate, Iraq. 6th century BC

In 1854, work at Borsippa was conducted under the direction of Henry Creswicke Rawlinson, with most of the actual digging done by his subordinates. Rawlinson personally uncovered the foundation prisms from Nebuchadnezzar II's restoration on the Nabu temple. Between 1879 and 1881 the site was excavated by Hormuzd Rassam for the British Museum. He concentrated primarily on E-zida, the temple of Nabu. In the 1890s looters removed about 2000 cuneiform tablets, mostly from the Ezida. In 1902, Robert Koldewey worked at Borsippa during his main effort at Babylon also mainly on the Nabu temple. E-DIM-AN-NA, temple of the bond of heaven, built by Nebuchadrezzar for the god Sin in the court of E-zida was also excavated.

Between 1980 and 2003, the Austrian team from the Leopold-Franzens-Universität Innsbruck led by Helga Piesl-Trenkwalder and Wilfred Allinger-Csollich excavated for sixteen seasons at the site. Early work concentrated on the large ziggurat E-ur-imin-an-ki and later on the Nabu temple. Examinination determined that the ziggurat had a 60 by 60 meter core of unbaked bricks with a mantle of baked bricks (or Kassite and Neo-Babylonian origin) bringing the structure up to 78 by 78 meters. The mantle was covered by a layer of baked bricks bonded by bitumen. Reeds, ropes, and wooden beams were used to bond the layers together. It was found that the ziggurat had been partially hollowed out in Parthian times. Tablets of the Neo-Babylonian period were found.

Many legal administrative and astronomical texts on cuneiform tablets have originated at Borsippa and have turned up on the black market with the first large, around 2000, group of tablets being sold to the British Museum in 1894-1900. Archives began to be published in the 1980s. An inscription of Nebuchadnezzar II, the "Borsippa inscription," tells how he restored the temple of Nabu, "the temple of the seven spheres," with "bricks of noble lapis lazuli." that must have been covered with a rich blue glaze. The Austrian archeologists have determined that Nebuchadnezzar's ziggurat encased the ruins of a smaller tower from the second millennium BC. When it was completed it reached a height of 70 meters, in seven terraces; even in ruin it still stands a striking 52 meters over the perfectly flat plain. An inscribed foundation stone has been recovered, which details Nebuchadnezzar's plan to have the Borsippa ziggurat built on the same design as that at Babylon, of which only the foundation survives. Nebuchadnezzar declared that Nabu's tower would reach the skies, another inscription states. The reconstruction under the patronage of Bel-Marduk is summarized on a cylinder in Akkadian of Antiochus I (Antiochus cylinder), an example of the region's remarkable cultural continuity.

In 2022 a test ground penetrating radar test was conducted over a 130 meter by 90 meter section at the site.

Since 2023, after a 20-year break in excavations, the Austrian Archaeological Expedition archaeological team led by Sandra Heinsch and Walter Kuntner has resumed investigations in the ancient city of Borsippa. In addition to examining the ziggurat and the adjacent Ezida Temple to research the multi-period temple architecture, the excavations also focus on the extensive urban area to shed light on the cityscape of ancient Borsippa.

The adjacent area of Tell Ibrahim al-Khalil holds the city's residential quarter. In 1981 a hoard of jewelry artifacts was found at Tell Ibrahim al-Khalil, dated to the Medieval period (10th to 12th century AD).

== Gallery ==
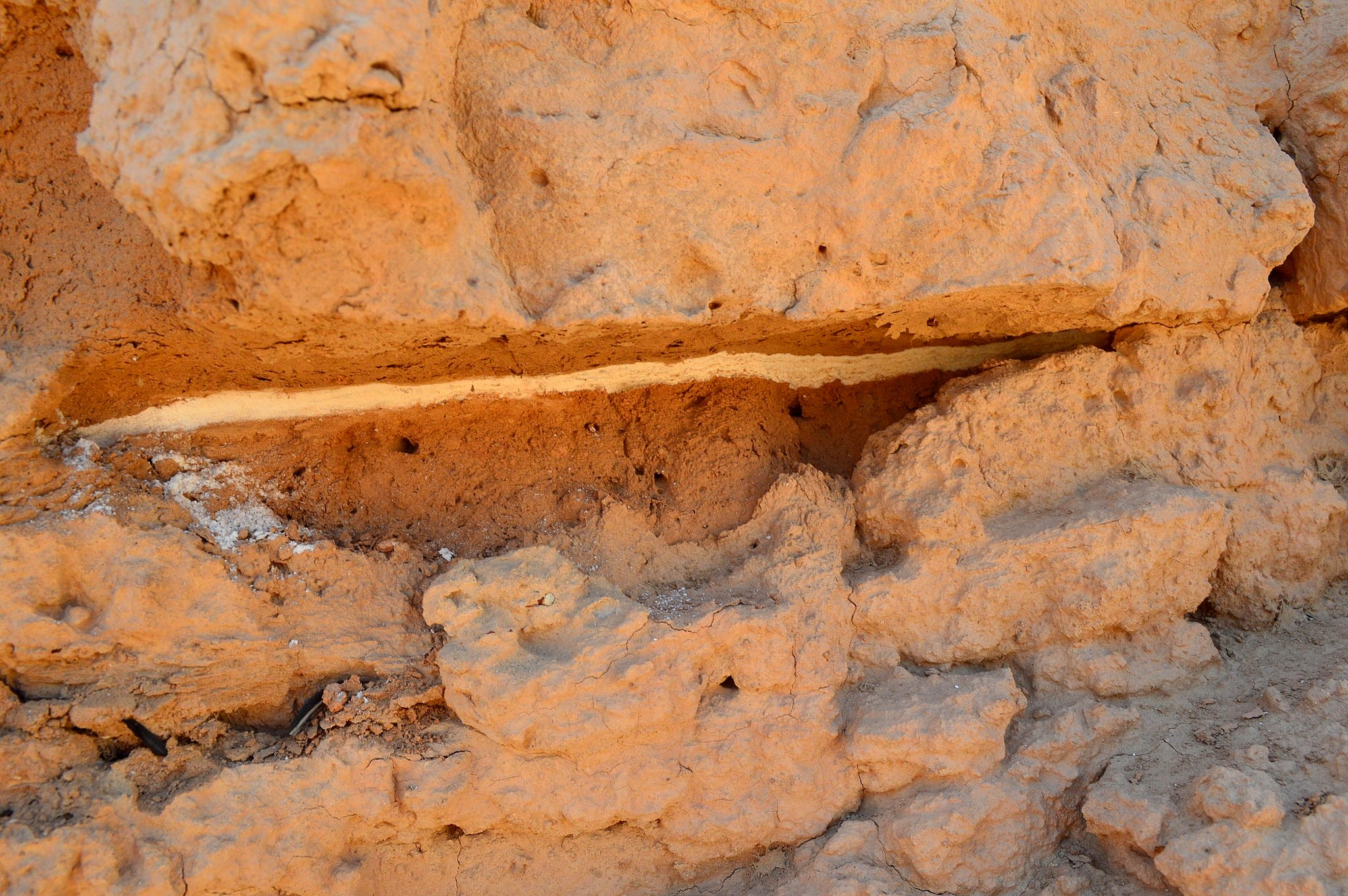
The original ancient gypsum plaster between mud-bricks, Borsippa, Babel, Iraq

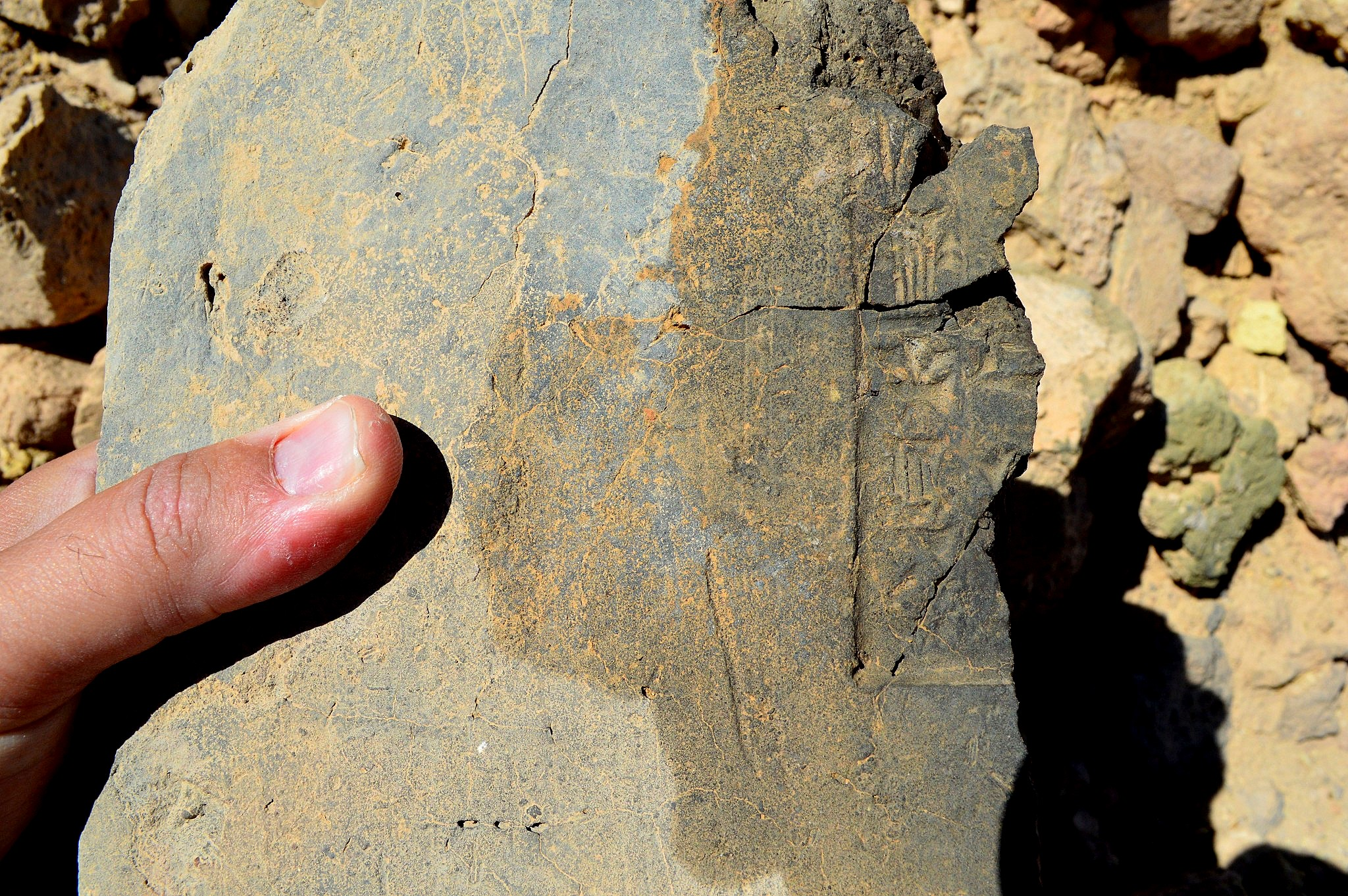
Stamped mud-brick from the ziggurat and temple of Nabu at Borsippa, Iraq, 6th century BC

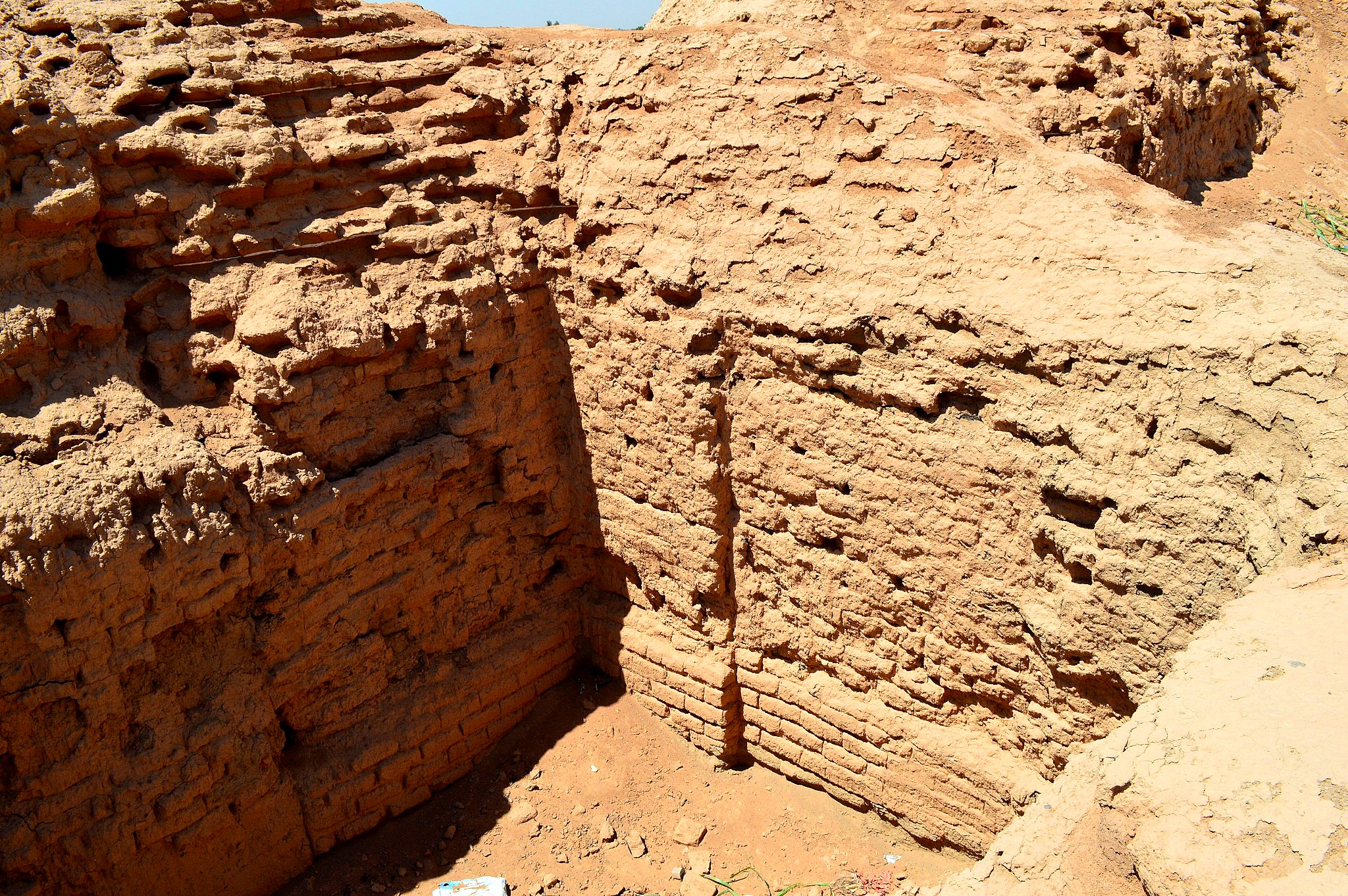
Ruins around the ziggurat and temple of the god Nabu at Borsippa, Babel Governorate, Iraq

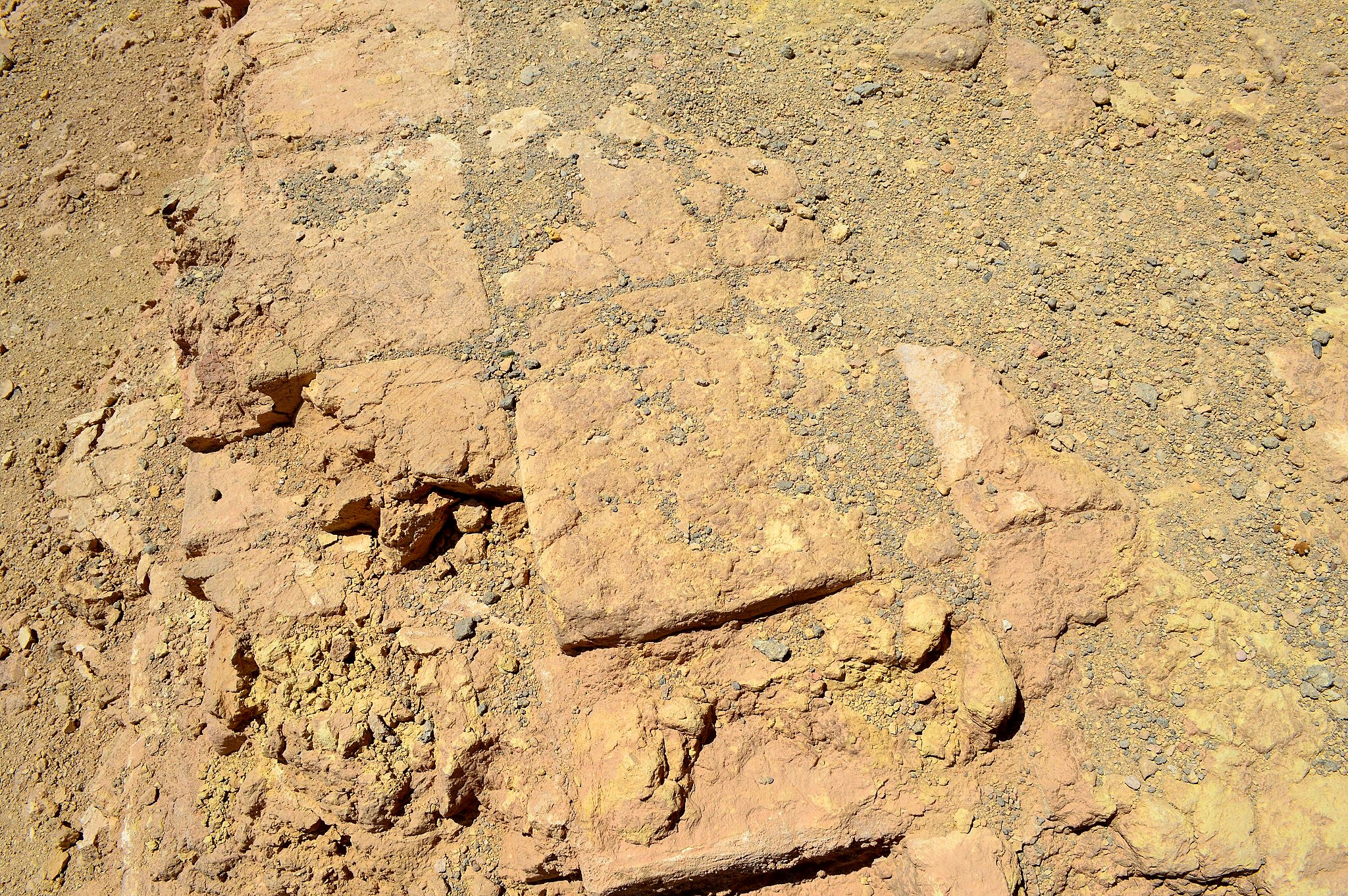
Original tiles at the upper surface of the ziggurat and temple of Nabu at Borsippa, Iraq

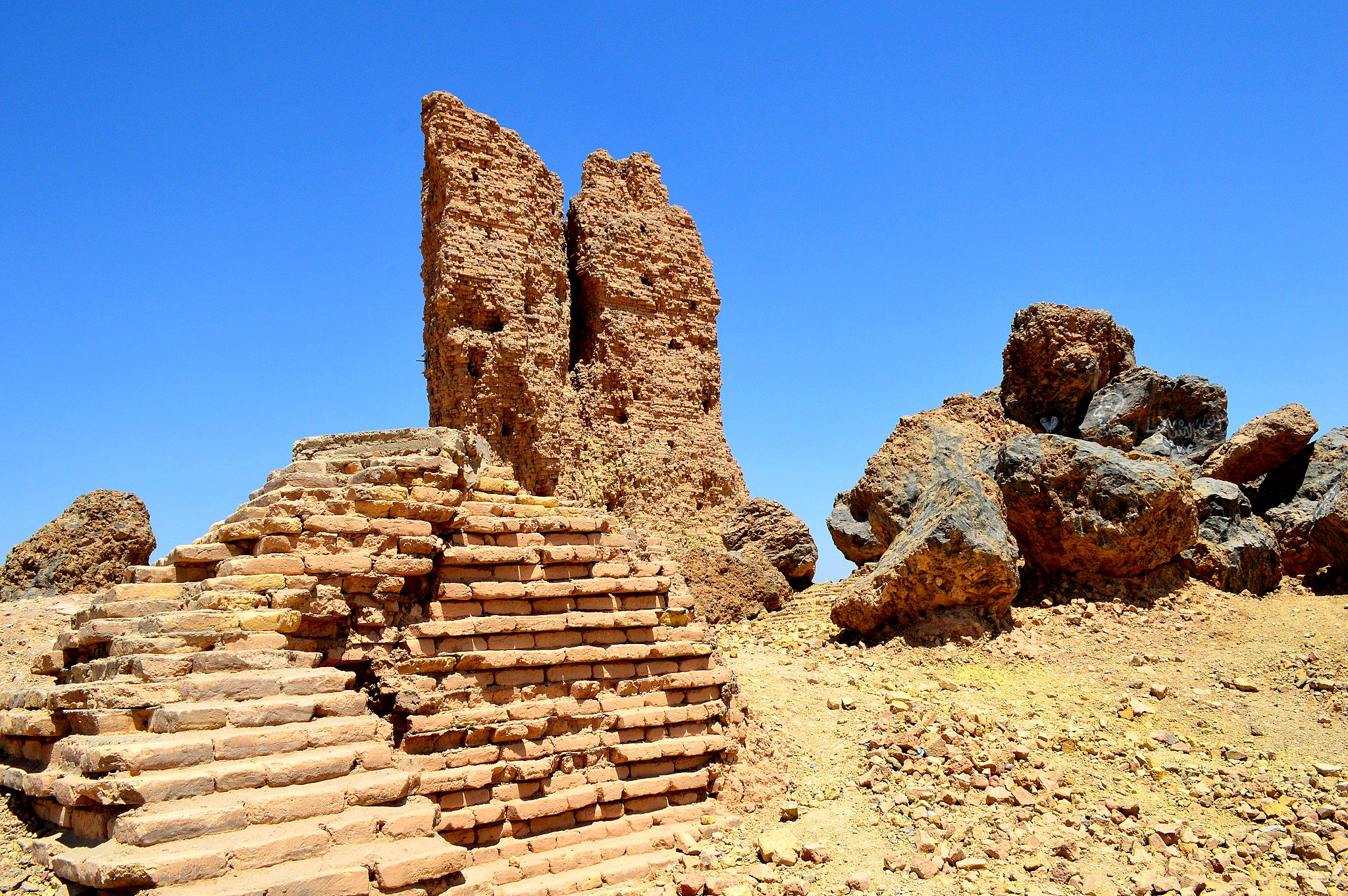
The upper surface of the ruins of the ziggurat and temple of Nabu at Borsippa, Iraq

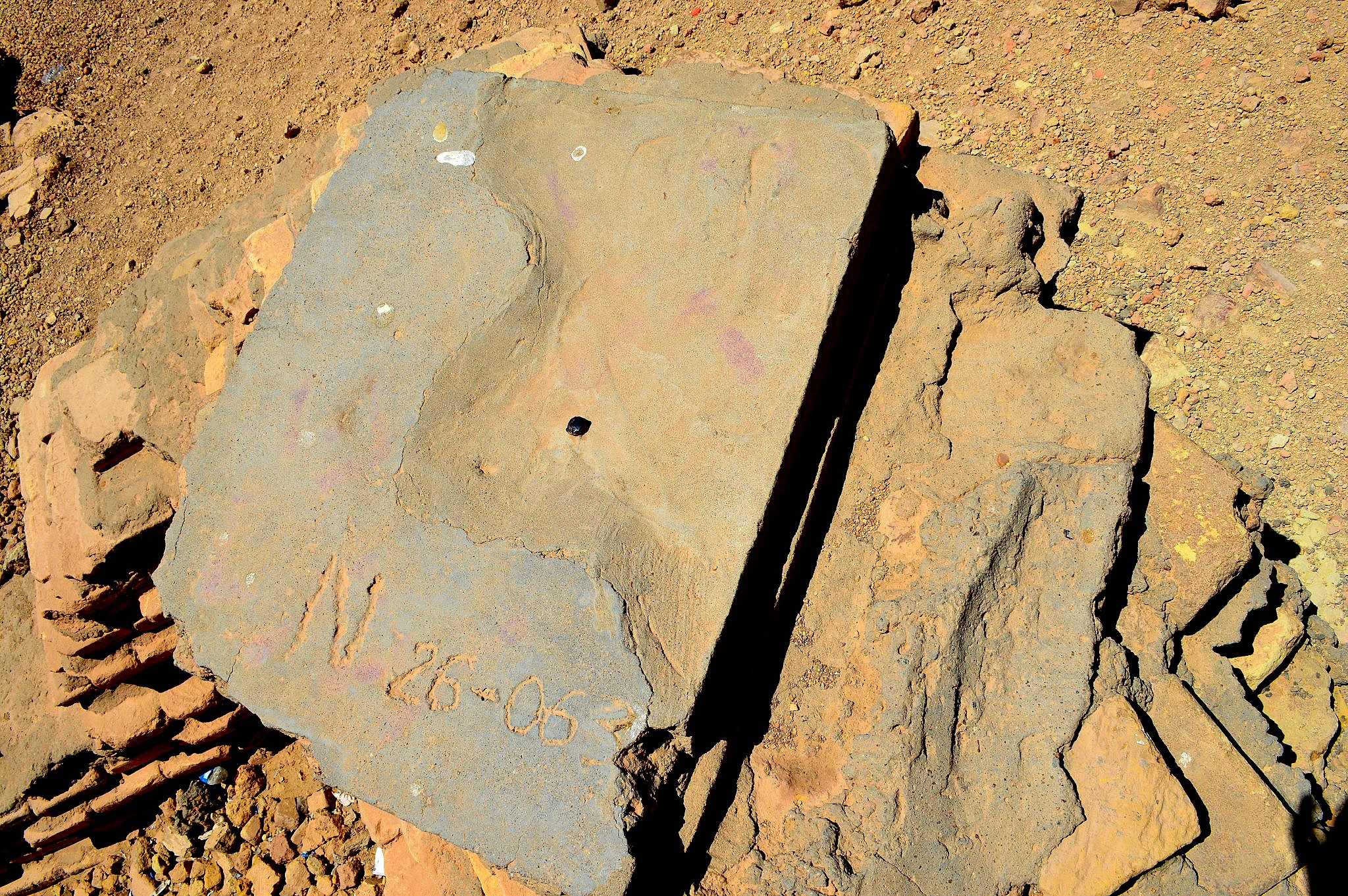
Modern cement covering ancient bricks at the upper surface of the ziggurat and temple of Nabu, Borsippa, Iraq

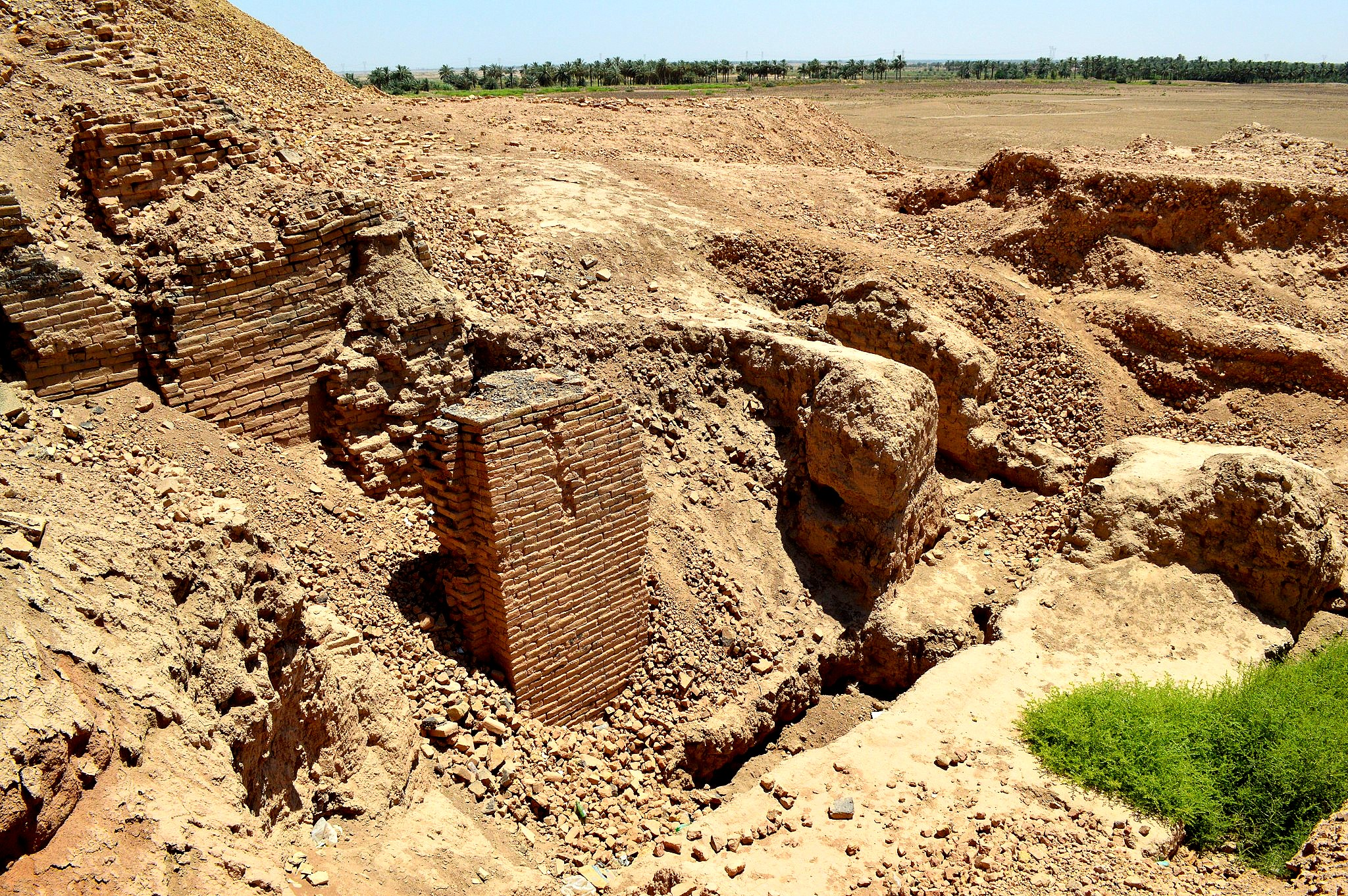
Ruins of the lower part of the ziggurat and temple of Nabu at Borsippa, Babel Governorate, Iraq

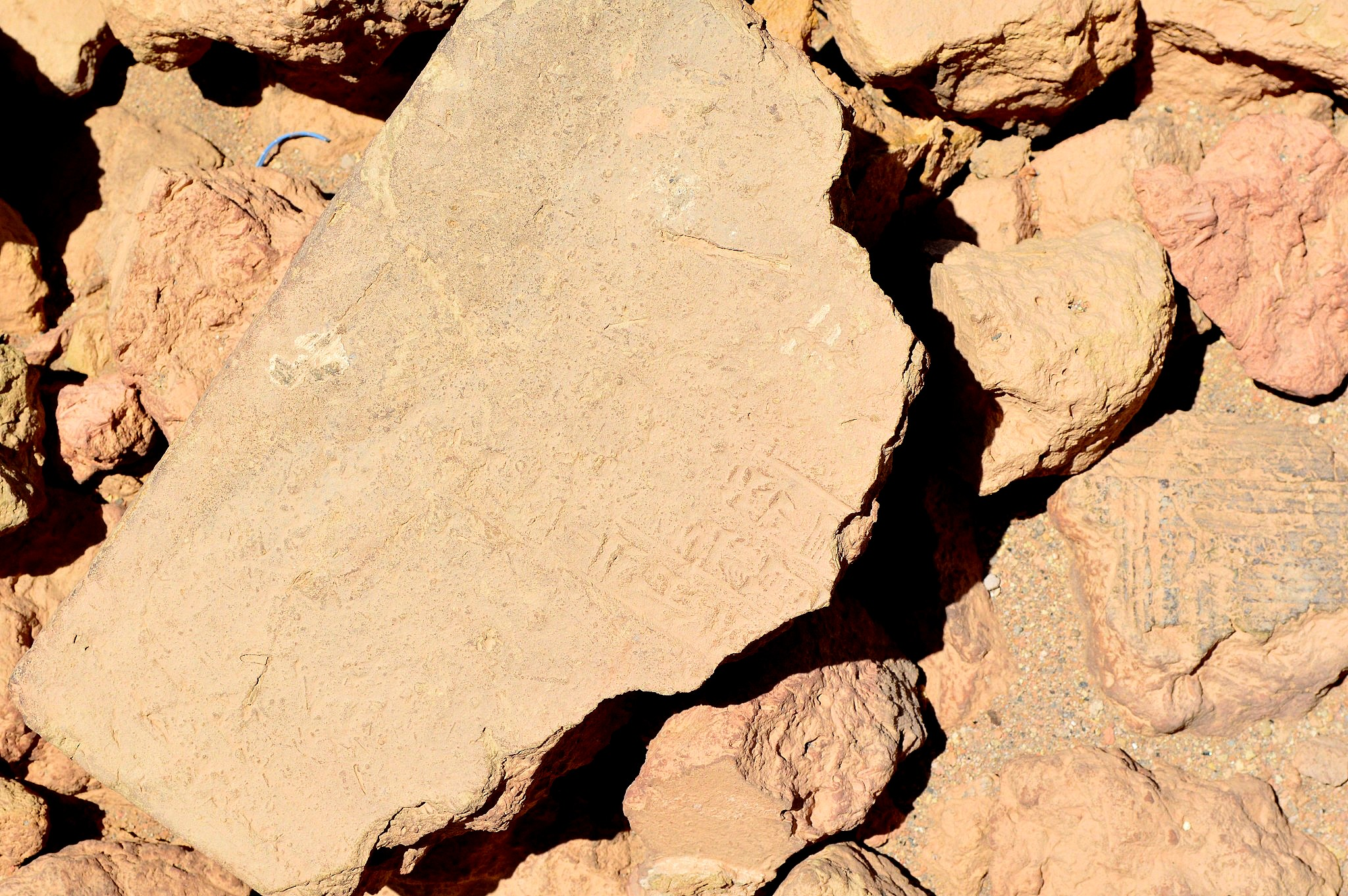
Stamped mud-brick from the ziggurat and temple of Nabu, Borsippa, Iraq

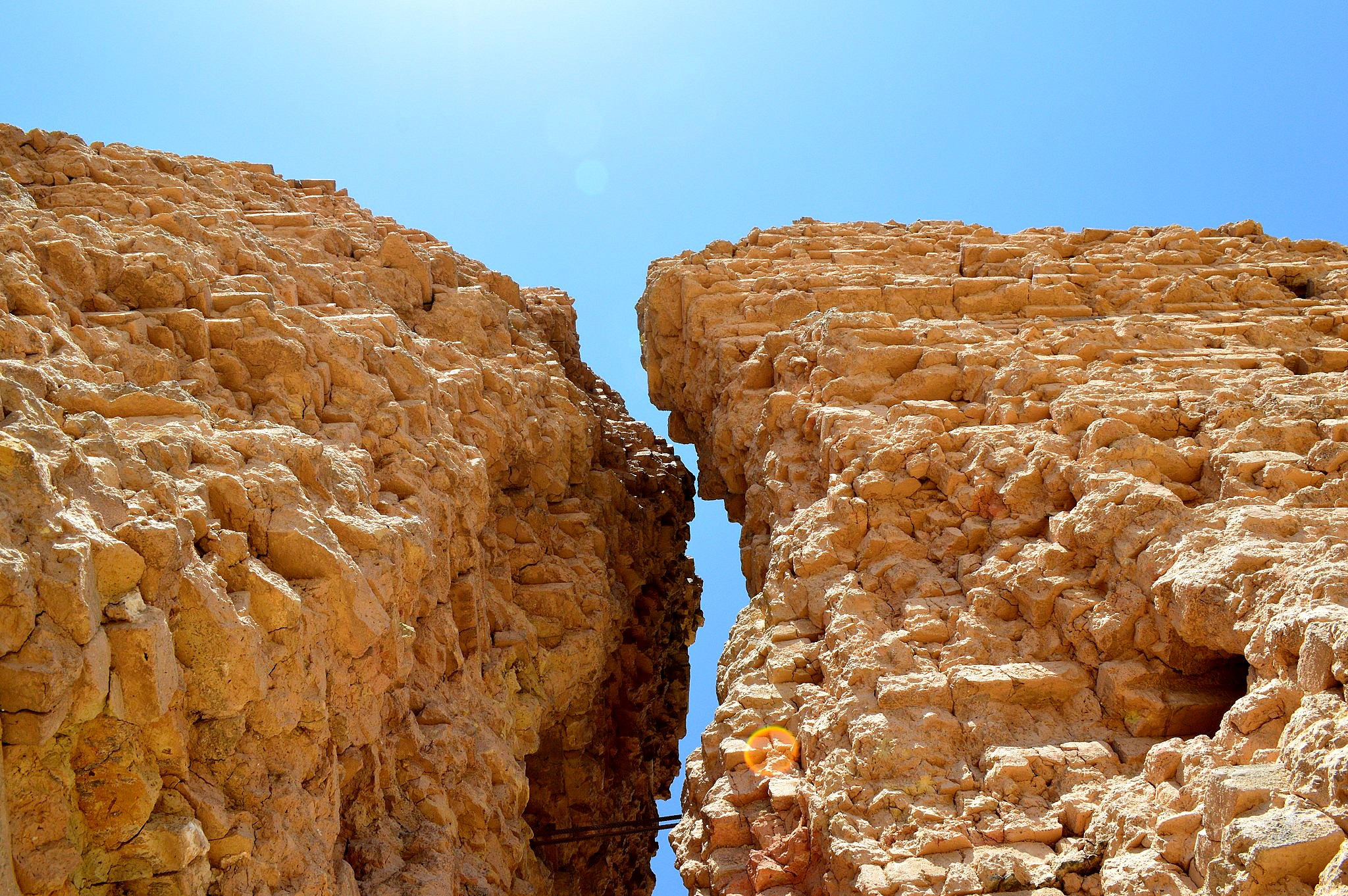
The upper part of the Tongue Tower of the ziggurat and temple of Nabu at Borsippa, Iraq

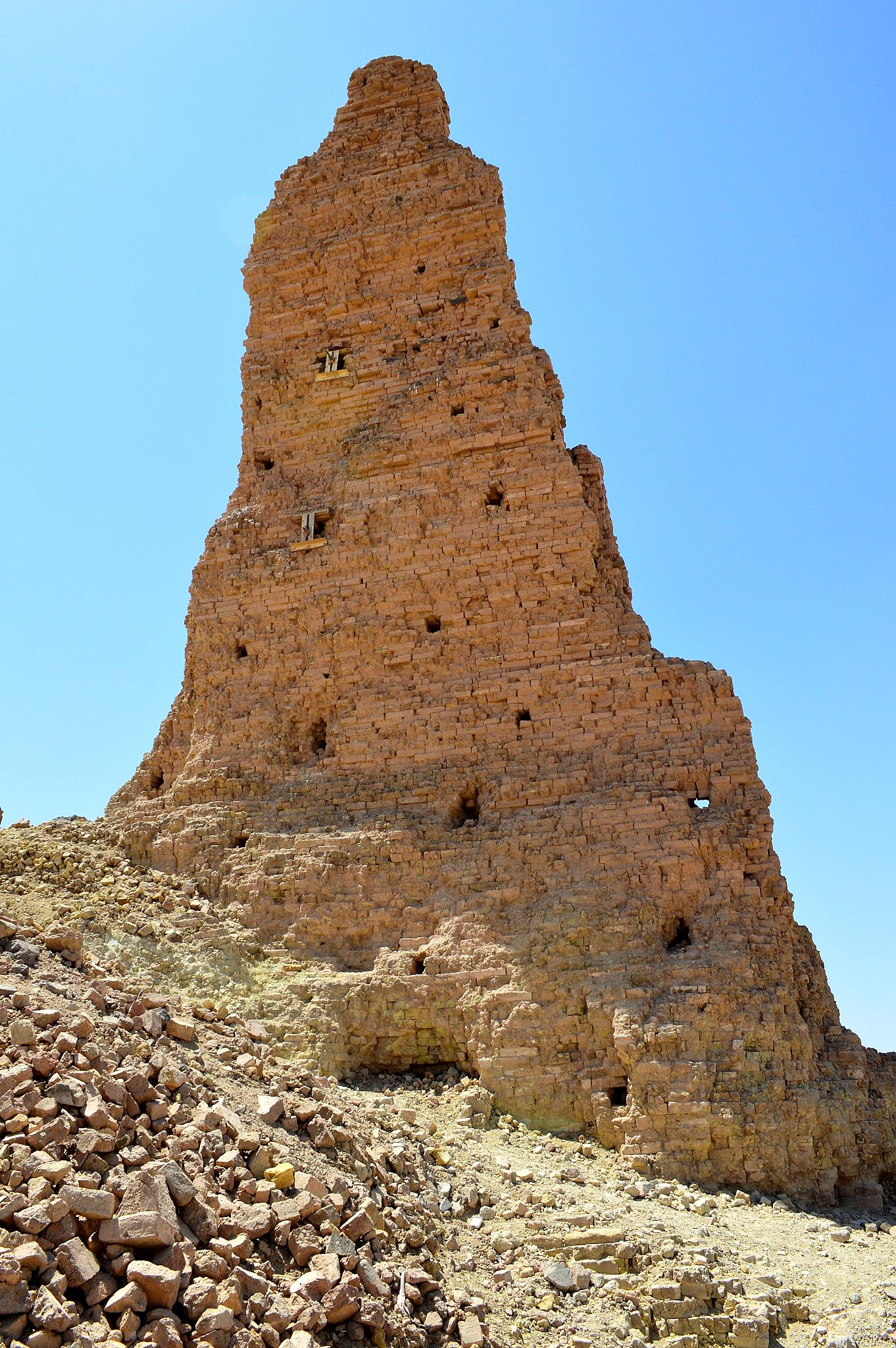
The ruins of the so-called Tongue Tower of the ziggurat and temple of the god Nabu at Borsippa, Babel Governorate, Iraq, 6th century BC

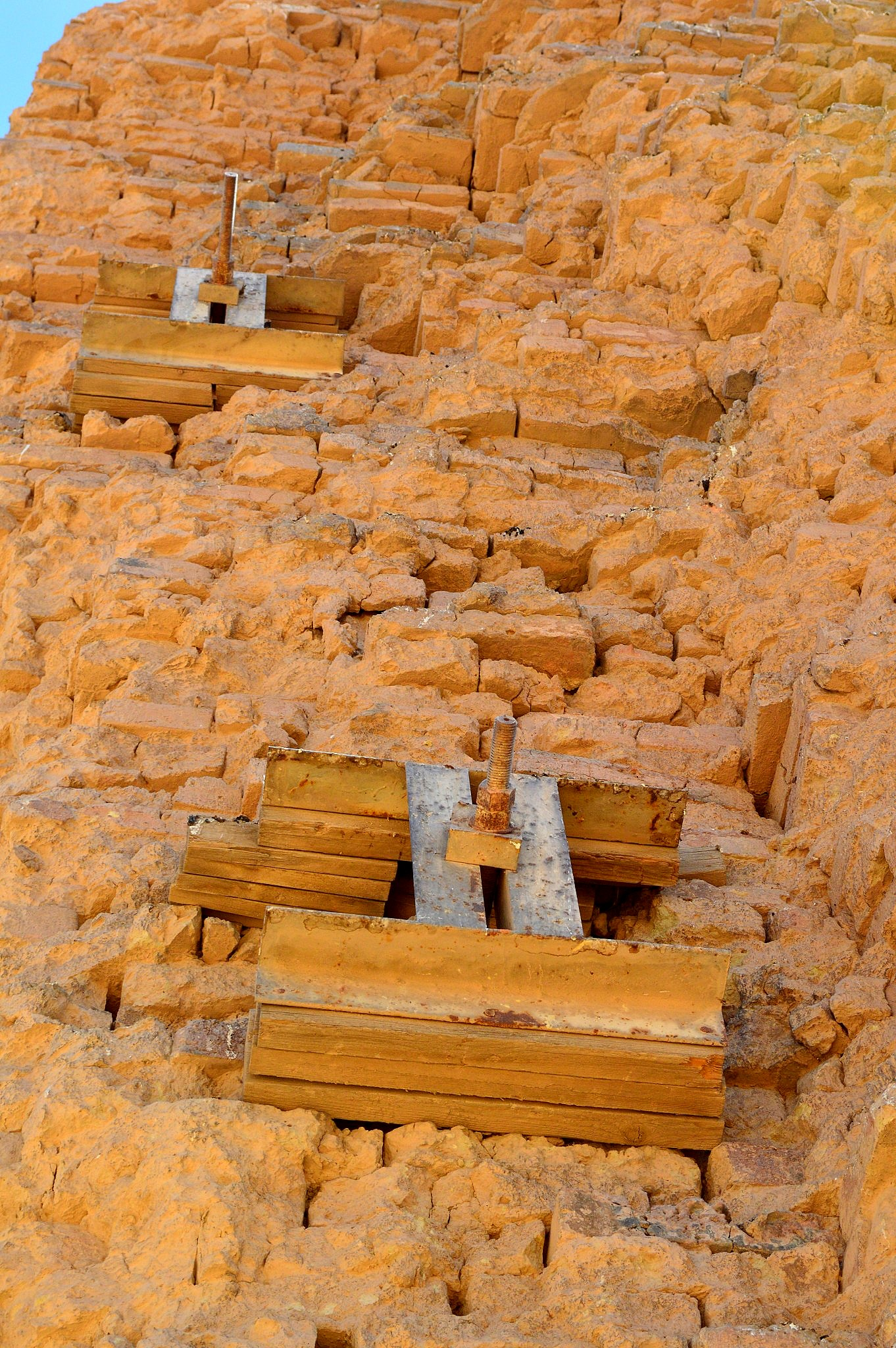
The ruins of the so-called Tongue Tower of the ziggurat of Nabu at Borsippa, Babel Governorate, Iraq, 6th century BC

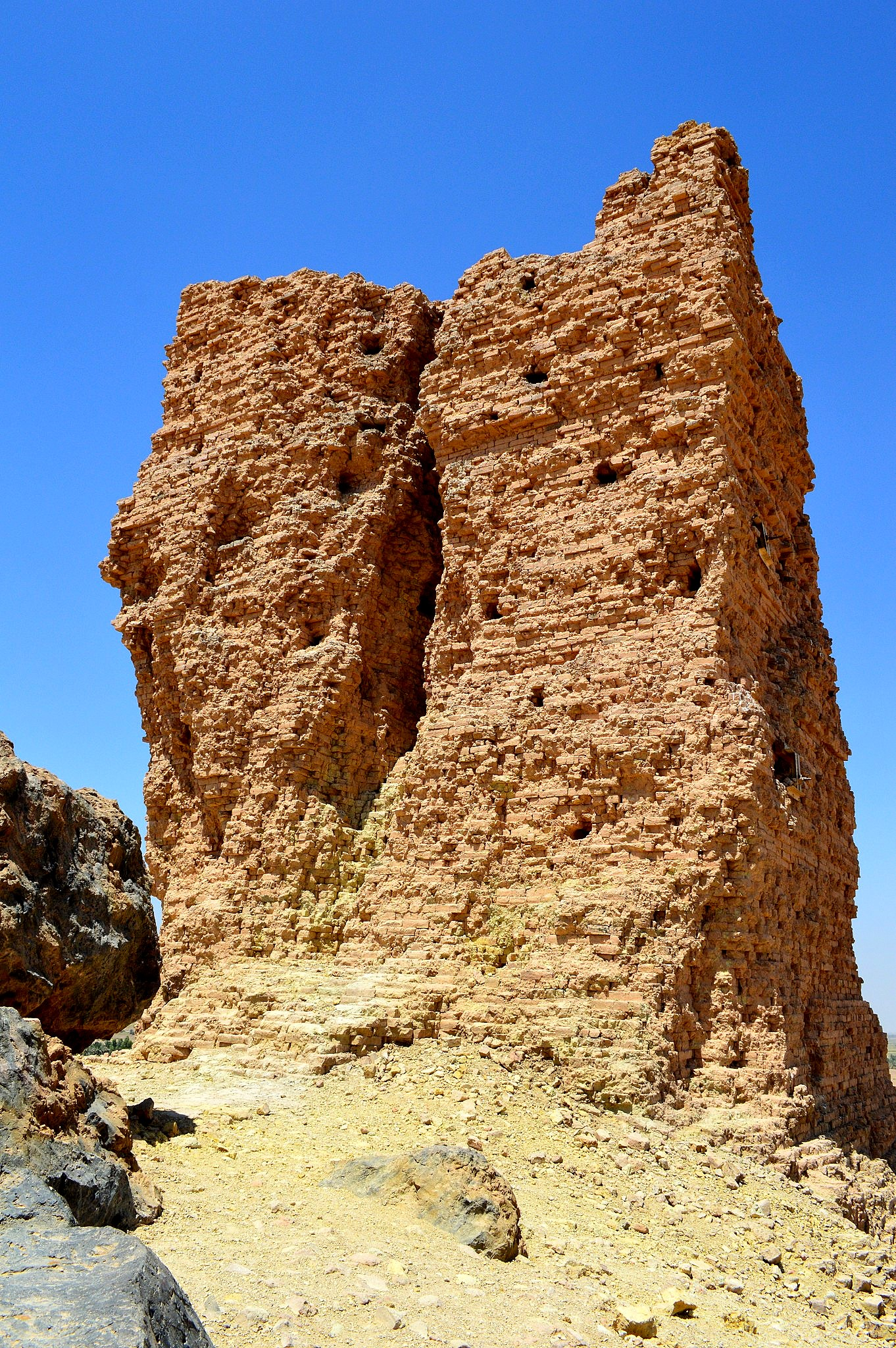
The ruins of the so-called Tongue Tower of the ziggurat and temple of Nabu at Borsippa, Iraq

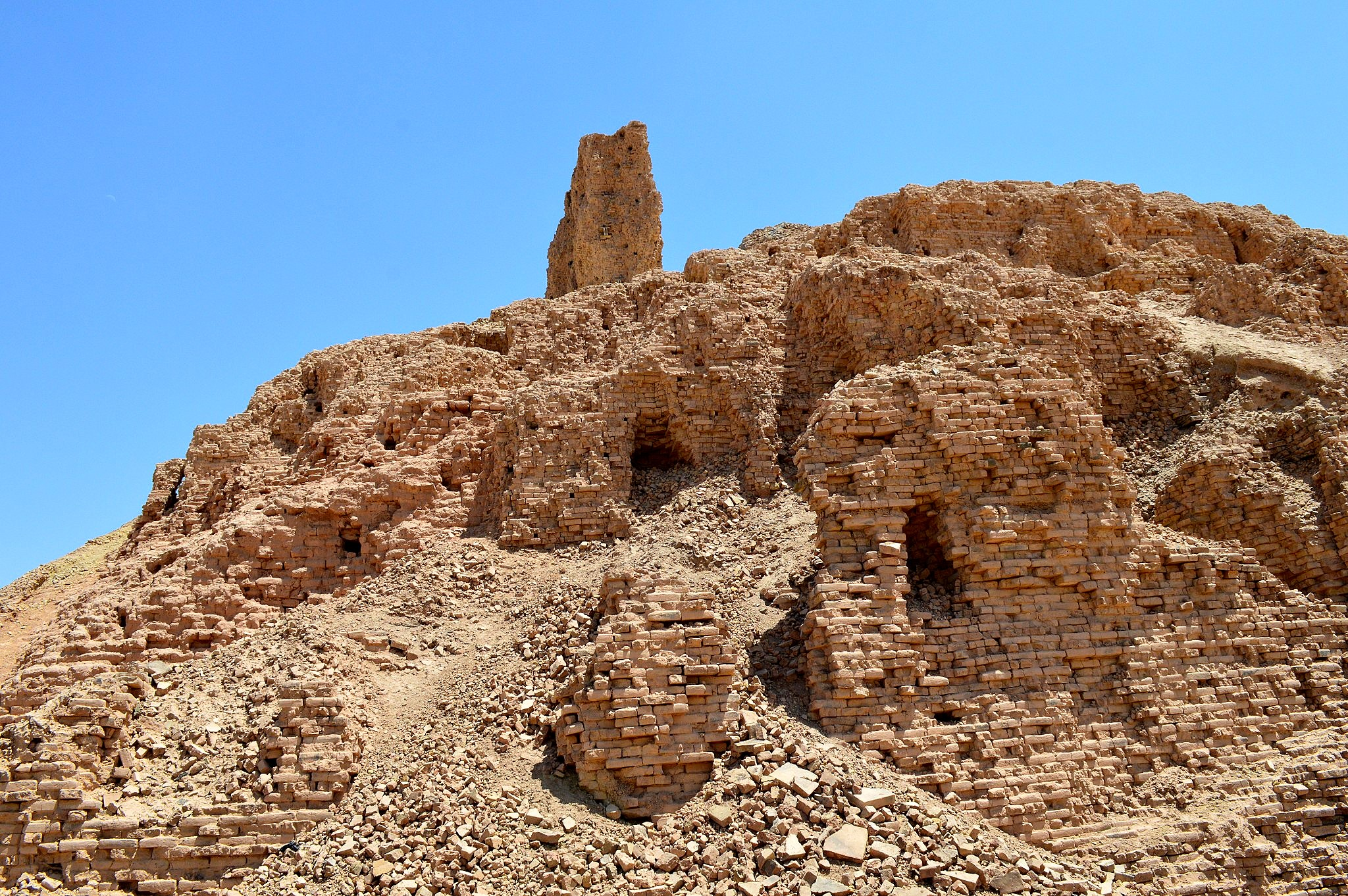
Ruins of the ziggurat and temple of god Nabu, Borsippa, Babel Governorate, Iraq, sixth century BC

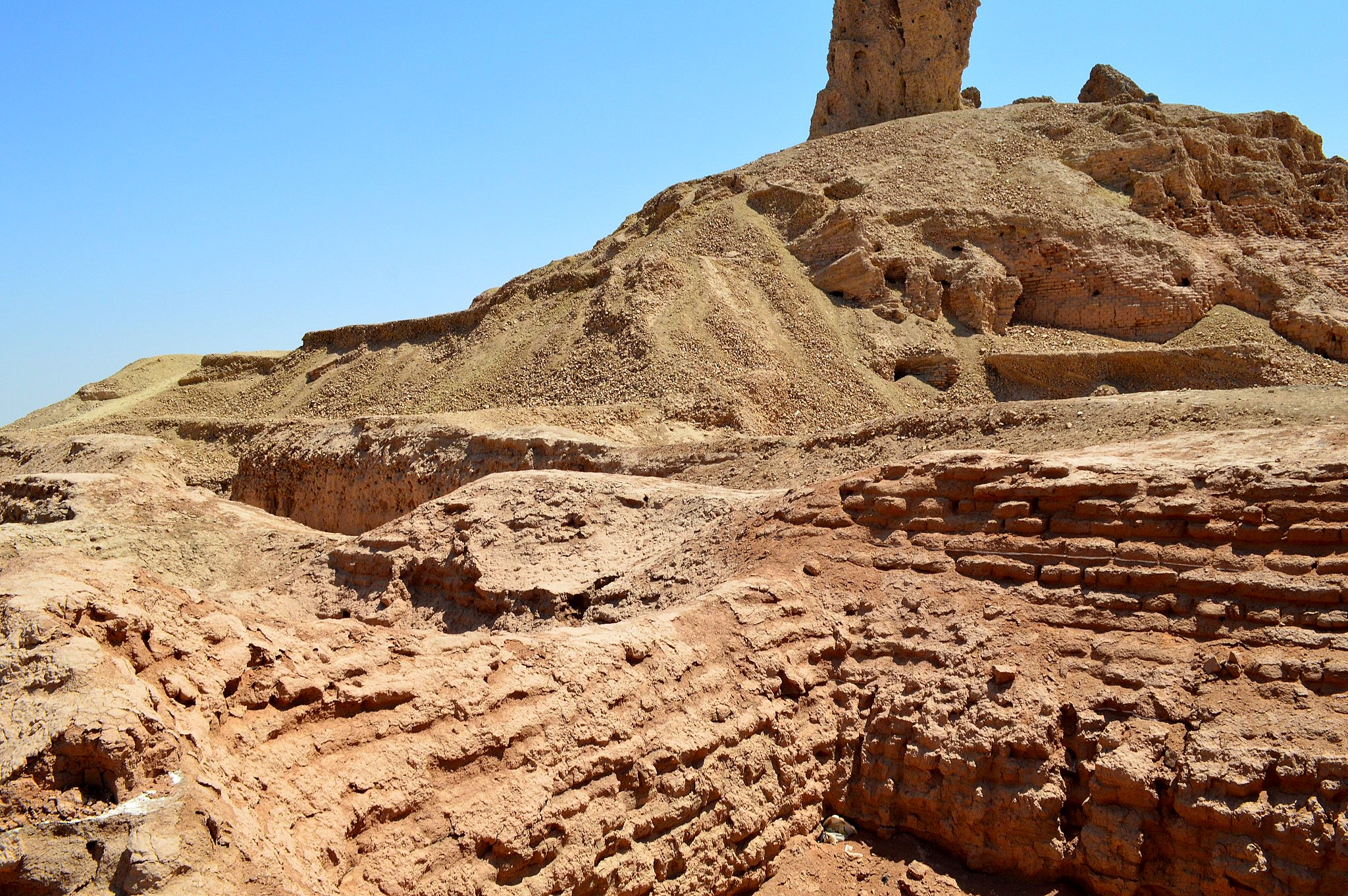
Ruins of the ziggurat and temple of god Nabu at Borsippa, Babel Governorate, Iraq

== See also ==
- Cities of the Ancient Near East
- Chronology of the ancient Near East
