= Nabu =

Mesopotamian god of literacy and scribes

Nabû
- God of literacy, the rational arts, scribes, and wisdom
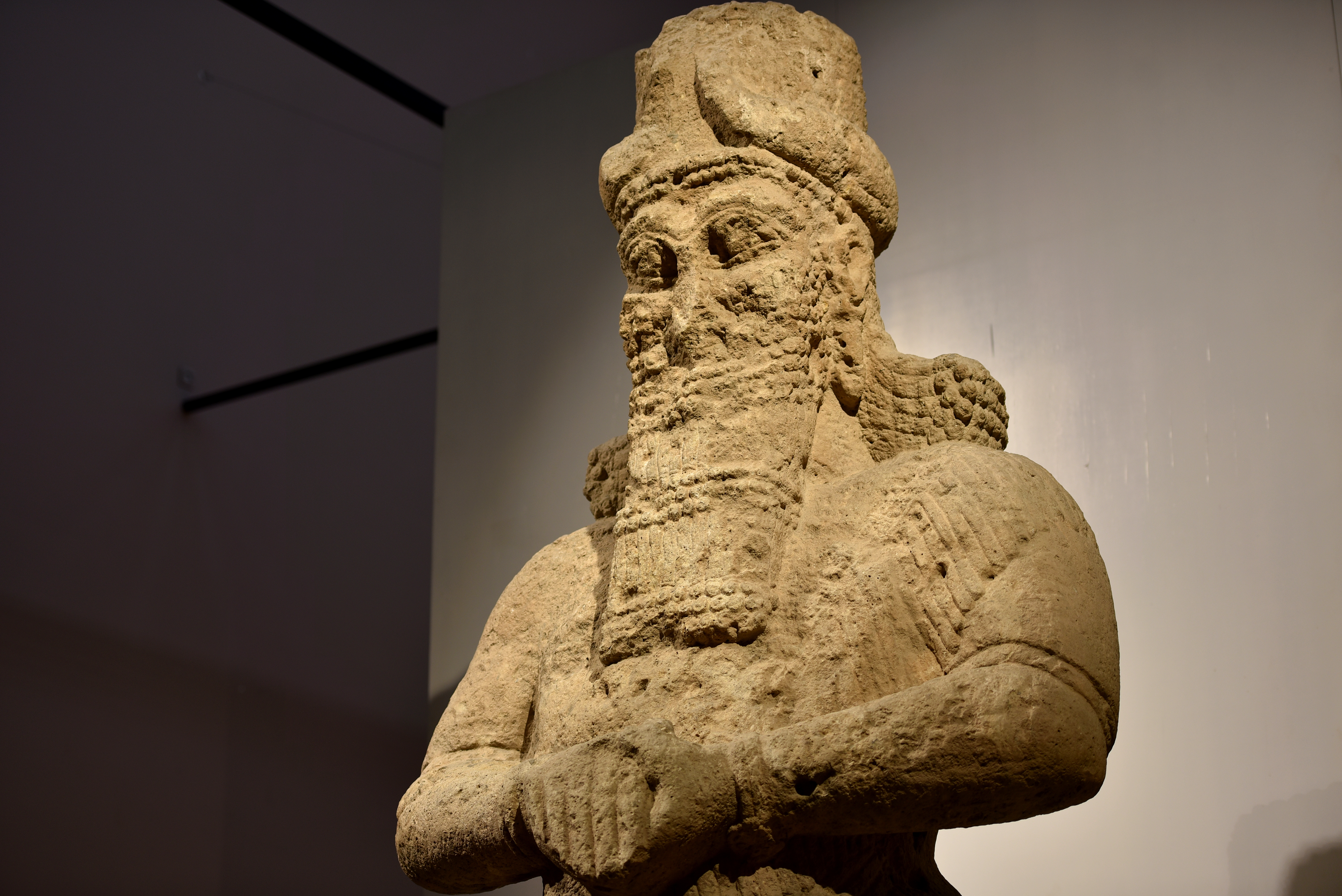
- Colossal statue of Nabu, 8th century BC, from Nimrud, on display in the National Museum of Iraq
- Abode: Borsippa
- Planet: Mercury
- Symbol: Clay tablet and stylus
- Parents: Marduk and Sarpanitum
- Consort: Tashmet

Equivalents
- Greek: Hermes
- Roman: Mercury
- Hindu: Budha
- Mandaean: Nbu
- Egyptian: Thoth
- Norse: Odin
- Celtic: Lugus

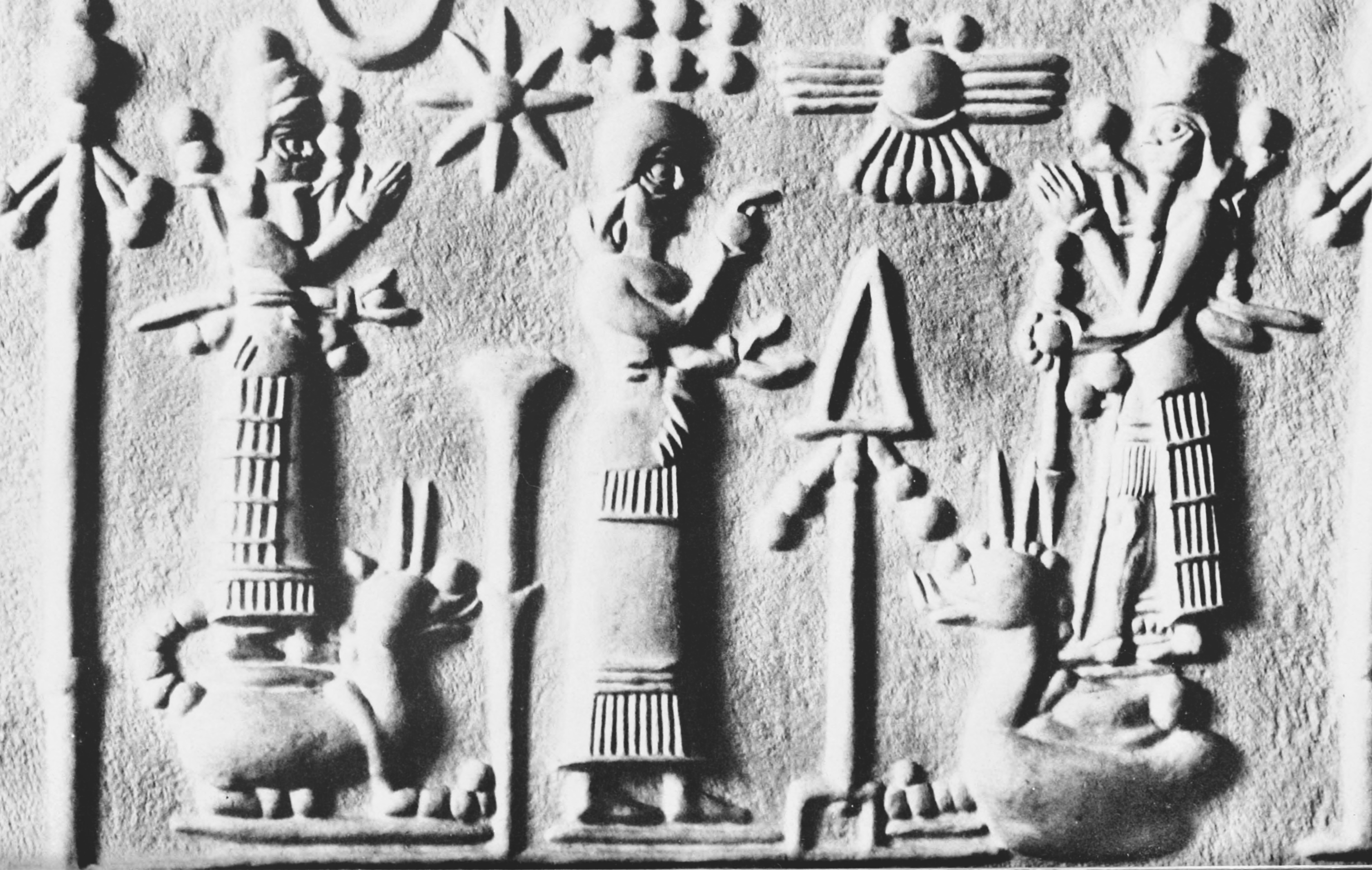
Eighth-century BCE Assyrian seal portraying a worshipper between Nabu and Marduk, who each stand on a mušḫuššu (servant dragon)

Nabu (Akkadian: 𒀭𒀝, romanized: Nabû, Jewish Babylonian Aramaic: נְבוֹ, romanized: Nəḇo) is the Babylonian patron god of literacy, scribes, wisdom, and the rational arts. He is associated with the classical planet Mercury in Babylonian astronomy.

== Etymology and meaning ==
The Akkadian nabû means 'announcer' or 'authorised person', derived from the Semitic root n-b-y or nbʾ. It is cognate with Classical Syriac: ܢܒܝܐ, romanized: nəḇiyyā, Arabic: نبي, romanized: nabiyy, and Hebrew: נביא, romanized: nāḇi, all meaning 'prophet'.

== History ==
Nabu was worshiped by the Babylonians and the Assyrians. Nabu gained prominence among the Babylonians in the 1st millennium BC when he was identified as the son of the god Marduk.

Nabu was worshipped in Babylon's sister city Borsippa, from where his statue was taken to Babylon each New Year so that he could pay his respects to his father. Nabu's symbols included a stylus resting on a tablet as well as a simple wedge shape; King Nabonidus, whose name references Nabu, had a royal sceptre topped with Nabu's wedge. Clay tablets with special calligraphic skill were used as offerings at Nabu's temple. His wife was the Akkadian goddess Tashmet.

Nabu was the patron god of scribes, literacy, and wisdom. He was also the inventor of writing, a divine scribe, the patron god of the rational arts, and a god of vegetation. As the god of writing, Nabu inscribed the fates assigned to men and he was equated with the scribe god Ninurta. As an oracle he was associated with the Mesopotamian moon god Sin. In the Babylonian tradition, planet Mercury was connected with Ninurta (as well as Saturn); because in the MUL.APIN Ninurta is consistently identified with Mercury, and it is read that: "Mercury whose name is Ninurta travels the (same) path the Moon travels." As Marduk took over the role of King of the gods from Enlil and inherited both his cultic roles and epithets as well as his position within the pantheon – the role of the most important son of the father of the gods that had previously belonged to Ninurta as son of Enlil (now replaced by Marduk); was thus taken over by Nabu, and Nabu became associated with the planet Mercury as well as being given connections with the moon god Sin, because as addressed in the MUL.APIN – even when Mercury was considered the planet of Ninurta, it still retained some moon-like aspects since it traveled the same path of the moon.

Nabu wore a horned cap, and stood with his hands clasped in the ancient gesture of priesthood. He rode on a winged dragon known as Sirrush that originally belonged to his father Marduk. In Babylonian astrology, Nabu was identified with the planet Mercury.

Nabu was continuously worshipped until the 2nd century, when cuneiform became a lost art.

Today in Mandaean cosmology, the name for Mercury is ʻNbu (ࡏࡍࡁࡅ), which is derived from the name Nabu.

=== Outside Mesopotamia ===
Nabu's cult spread to ancient Egypt. Names with Nabu in them are the most common theophoric names for Semitic speakers in Egypt as it was in the Neo-Babylonian texts. Nabu was also one of the Canaanite and Israelite deities worshipped in Elephantine and Aswan alongside gods like Yahweh, Nanay, Bethel, Anat, and the Queen of Heaven.

In the Hebrew Bible, Nabu is mentioned as Nəḇo (נְבוֹ) in Isaiah 46:1 and Jeremiah 48:1.

In the Hellenistic period, Nabu was sometimes identified with Apollo as a giver of prophecies. As the god of wisdom and a divine messenger, Nabu was linked with the Greek god Hermes, the Roman god Mercury, and the Egyptian deity Thoth.

== Bibliography ==
- Horowitz, Wayne (1998). Mesopotamian Cosmic Geography. Eisenbrauns. ISBN 978-0931464997.
- Hunger, Hermann; Steele, John (2018). The Babylonian Astronomical Compendium MUL.APIN. Taylor & Francis. ISBN 978-1351686815.
- Koch, Ulla Susanne (1995). Mesopotamian astrology: an introduction to Babylonian and Assyrian celestial divination. Museum Tusculanum Press. ISBN 978-8772892870.
