= Teloneum =

In the Middle Ages, the teloneum (also telonium or toloneum, from Greek τελώνιον, telonion, toll-house), in French tonlieu, sometimes anglicized thelony, was a market toll, a tax paid on a sale in the marketplace. The term originally referred to the customs house, but came gradually to refer to the tax levied. The collector of the teloneum was the telonearius.

The term teloneum first appeared in the fifth century. It came to cover numerous more specific tolls, such as the portaticum, rotaticum and pulveraticum. In the Merovingian period, the teloneum was a major source of royal revenues. The kings did sometimes give exemptions to abbeys, but rarely to anybody else. The teleonarii frequently farmed the taxes, often to Jews. A document issued by King Philip I of France around 1090 defined a teloneum as a tax on the transitum a vendentibus vel ementibus vel transeuntibus (transfer between seller and buyer).

== Justice ==
It might be just or unjust. A just thelony was a toll considered to be compensation for what would now be considered a public service. An unjust thelony was a fee exacted contrary to custom or where no service was rendered to the person made to pay it.

Examples of just thelonies, taken from Charlemagne’s 805 Capitulary of Aix-la-Chapelle, include: a fee or toll for using a market, or for passage over a bridge when that has traditionally been exacted, or for docking a ship for more than several days at a river bank. Unjust thelonies include: a toll on a bridge when none was exacted in the past, a fee for docking at a river bank for only a few days, a toll for passage on a road or through a forest or field, a toll exacted from persons going under a bridge.

Another of Charlemagne’s capitularies from 805, that of Thionville, forbade any “new or unjust thelony [to be] exacted where ropes are stretched or where ships pass under bridges, or in other similar cases in which no aid is lent to the travellers.” In 809, Charlemagne ordered: “[I]n the open country where there is no bridge built, we command that no thelony be exacted in any way.”

== Laws ==
A list of thelonies for ships and barges bringing goods to Billingsgate, in London, circa 1000, required the payment not only of money, but also — in the case of the men of the Emperor who came in ships — to give as thelony “on Christmas Day two grey garments, and one brown, ten pounds of pepper, gloves for five men, two leathern tuns of vinegar, and as much at Easter.” Henry I, King of England, in 1133 granted the citizens of London freedom from all thelony: “And let all men of London and all their goods both throughout England, and in harbors, be quit and free of thelony, passage, lastage, and all other customs.” Moreover, if any town or manor compelled thelony from a citizen of London, “let the citizens of London take in their city from that town or manor where thelony or custom was taken, as much as the man of London gave for thelony, and thus he will have been recompensed for the harm.”

Bishop Rüdiger of Speyer in 1084 invited a large number of Jews to live in his town "in my endeavor to turn the village of Speyer into a city." As part of this arrangement, he stated, "This also I have added that if any [other] Jew should at any time stay with them he shall pay no thelony." As part of this same arrangement, the Bishop provided that the Jews "were not required to pay tolls or duties [i.e., thelony] at the city's borders."
