= Babylonian cosmology =

Babylonian cosmology may refer to:

- Babylonian mythology
- Babylonian astronomy: Cosmology
