= Babylonian Map of the World =

Circa 8th-century BC clay tablet

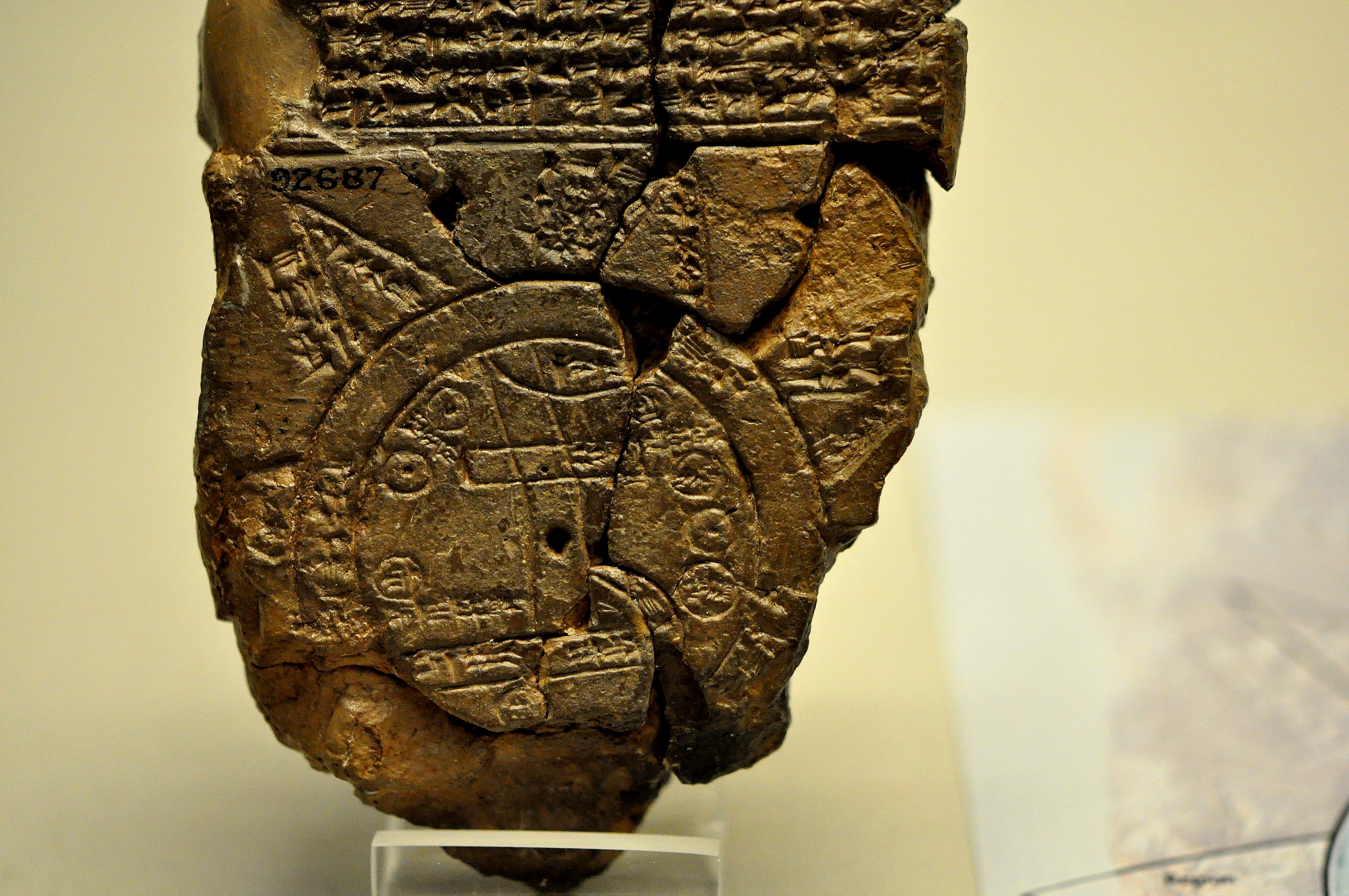
- Obverse
- Material: Clay
- Size: Height: 12.2 cm (4.8 in); Width: 8.2 cm (3.2 in)
- Writing: cuneiform
- Created: after 9th century BC
- Period/culture: Neo-Babylonian / early Achaemenid period
- Place: Sippar
- Present location: British Museum, (BM 92687; 1882,0714.509)

The Babylonian Map of the World (also Imago Mundi or Mappa mundi) is a Babylonian clay tablet with a schematic world map and two inscriptions written in the Akkadian language. Dated to no earlier than the 9th century BC (with a 6th-century BC date indicated by the British Museum), it includes a brief and partially lost textual description. The tablet describes the oldest known depiction of the then known world. Ever since its discovery there has been controversy on its general interpretation and specific features. Another pictorial fragment, VAT 12772, presents a similar topography from roughly two millennia earlier.

The map is used as the logo of the academic journal Imago Mundi.

The map is centered on the Euphrates, flowing from the north (top) to the south (bottom), with its mouth labelled "swamp" and "outflow". The city of Babylon is shown on the Euphrates, in the northern half of the map. Susa, the capital of Elam, is shown to the south, Urartu to the northeast, and Habban, the capital of the Kassites, is shown (incorrectly) to the northwest. Mesopotamia is surrounded by a circular "bitter river" or Ocean, and seven or eight foreign regions are depicted as triangular sections beyond the Ocean, perhaps imagined as mountains.

The tablet was excavated by Hormuzd Rassam at Sippar (AKA Abu Habbah), Baghdad vilayet, some 60 km north of Babylon on the east bank of the Euphrates River. It was initially registered by the British Museum on July 14, 1882 (BM 92687). The exact details of the tablet's initial discovery and travel back to the British Museum is fuzzy as the Museum's records are incomplete or missing key details. The Abu Habbah excavation site operated operated under several expeditions, the expedition that the tablets were obtained from were believed happen between 1881 and 1882.

== Historiography ==
The text from the tablet has been translated several times, and not always accurately. The first translation was published in 1889 by F.E. Peiser where the tablet got its first spurt of popularity. Another translation was made in 1906 by R. Campbell Thompson that garnered attention from academics, including E.F. Weidner in 1922, B. Meissner in 1925, and E. Unger in 1937. E.F Weidner particularly focused on the text on the backside of the map and makes claims that it's real focus is on King Sargon. B.Meissner claimed that the tablet was a map of the world. Unger made several claims building off of the idea that the map was the center of the universe. Decades later, in 1988 and later revised in 2011, Wayne Horowitz notes several errors in translations and creates a new copy of the translated text. In addition to the new translation, Horowitz brings his own claims that the map is from a Babylonian perspective rather than Assyrian. In 1995, a new section of the tablet was discovered, at the point of the upper-most triangle by Edith Horsley, a student and volunteer of Irving Finkel. I. Finkel later goes on to claim that the tablet is a map of the earliest in the world of the ginormous Babylon where the "nagu" are in reality remote mountains.

== Description of the tablet ==
The tablet consists of three parts: the world map, a text above it, and a text on the reverse side. It is not clear whether all three parts should be read as a single document. Systematic differences between the texts suggest that the tablet may have been compiled from three separate documents.

=== The map ===
The map is circular with two boundary circles. Cuneiform script labels all locations inside the circular map, as well as a few regions outside. The two circles represent a body of water labelled ^{id}maratum "bitter river", the salt sea. Babylon is marked north of center; parallel lines at the bottom seem to represent the southern marshes, and a curved line coming from the north-northeast appear to represent the Zagros Mountains.

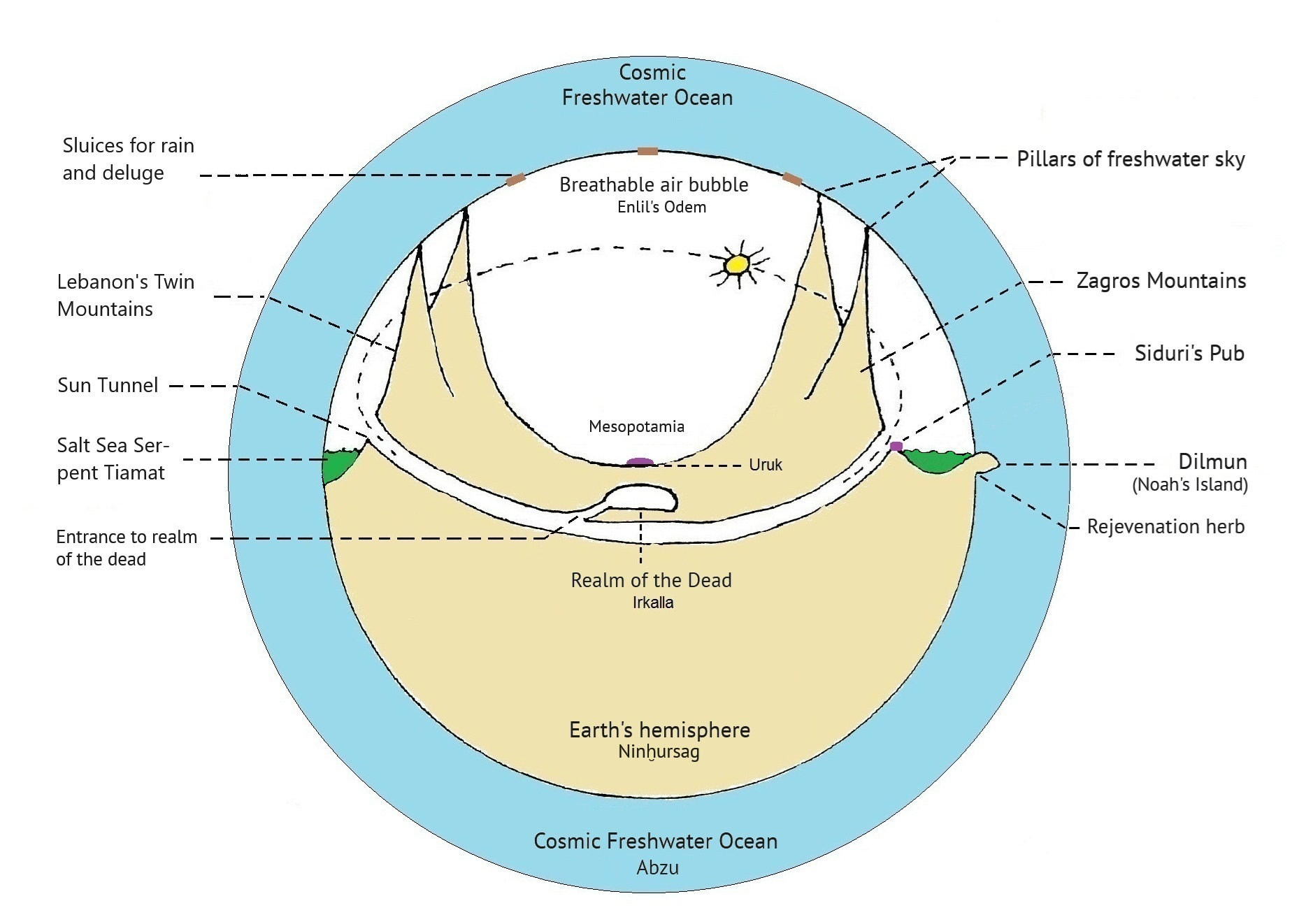
Illustration of Sumerian creation myths. They describe the Abzu as cosmic freshwater ocean, whose mating with serpent Tiamat – a symbol of the salty sea – gave rise to Mother Earth Ninhursag. The Abzu envelops our planet from above and below, whilst Tiamat, also called the "bitter river", flows around its edges, so the sketch shows the same as Babylon's map, now in sideview. A bubble of breathable air clings to earth, with the Abzu's boundary layer as "a roof" like on Athrahasis's lifeboat. Further details, such as the "Babylonian's Noah" island (Dilmun) and the tunnel (through which sun god Shamash travels at night), are taken from the text of the Babylonian world map as well as of the Gilgamesh epic. An important technical detail are also the sluices built into sky. Through them, the gods, well skilled in construction of irrigation systems, supplied their garden land Eden with rain, but also unleashed the Flood.

There are seven small interior circles within the perimeter of the circle, appearing to represent seven cities. Seven or eight triangular sections outside the water circle represent named "regions" (nagu). The descriptions for five of them have survived.

=== Numbered Objects On The Map ===
The numbered items displayed on the map below are transcribed according to several works from Horowitz.

1. "Mountain" (Akkadian: šá-du-ú)
2. "City" (Akkadian: uru)
3. Urartu (Akkadian: ú-ra-áš-tu)
4. Assyria (Akkadian: kuraš+šurki)
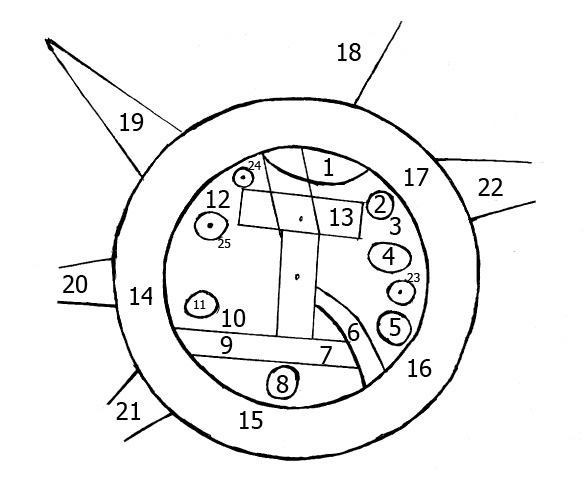
5. Numbered Babylonian Map of the World Created by user EvgenyGenkin inspired from Horowitz (1988).
  Der (Sumer) (Akkadian: dēr) (a city)
6. Unknown (Akkadian: x-ra) (used for missing or damaged signs)
7. Swamp (Akkadian: ap-pa-ru)
8. Susa (capital of Elam) (Akkadian: šuša)
9. Canal/"outflow" (Akkadian: bit-qu)
10. Bit Yakin (Akkadian: bῑt-ia-᾿-ki-nu) (a region)
11. "City" (Akkadian: uru)
12. Habban (Akkadian: ha-ab-ban) (a Kassite land and city)
13. Babylon (Akkadian: tin.tir^{ki}), divided by Euphrates
14. Ocean (salt water, Akkadian: ^{id}mar-ra-tum)
15. Ocean (salt water, Akkadian: ^{id}mar-ra-tum)
16. Ocean (salt water, Akkadian: ^{id}mar-ra-tum)
17. Ocean (salt water, Akkadian: ^{id}mar-ra-tum)
18. "Region 6 leagues in between, where the Sun is not seen" (Akkadian: na-gu-ú 6 'bēru ina bi-rit a-šar Šamaš la innammaru). Referred to as "The Great Wall" which may be an assortment of different interpretations. The "6 leagues in between" referring to a mountain range the width of the Ocean. "Where the Sun is not seen" refers to a dark distant earthy region that gained infamy from a past time due to the first ruler of the Akkadian Empire, Sargon of Akkad, who it is said took stones from said land. This had significance to Babylonian's at the time because these lands were considered so distant, in our modern view, it could be seen as reaching into outer space. Alternatively, the "Sun is not seen" because at the latitude of Babylon, the sun can never be located in the northern section of the sky.
19. "nagu, 6 leagues in between" (Akkadian: na-gu-ú 6 'bēru ina bi-rit). The nagu on the map are the mountain shaped areas outside the inner-circle. Specifically on the tablet itself, the reverse side describes nagu but its descriptions do not line up with what is seen on the front. This is interpreted as the 3 remaining nagu not on the map as the ones being described but this cannot be known. Despite the main interpretations as mountains, it is very likely possible that they are islands separated by the Akkadian: ^{id}mar-ra-tum or Ocean.
20. "[nag]u [..." (rest of text missing)
21. "[na]gu [..." (rest of text missing)
22. "nagu, 8 leagues in between" (Akkadian: na-gu-ú 8 'bēru ina bi-rit).
23. No description.
24. No description.
25. No description.

=== Accompanying texts ===
==== Front side ====
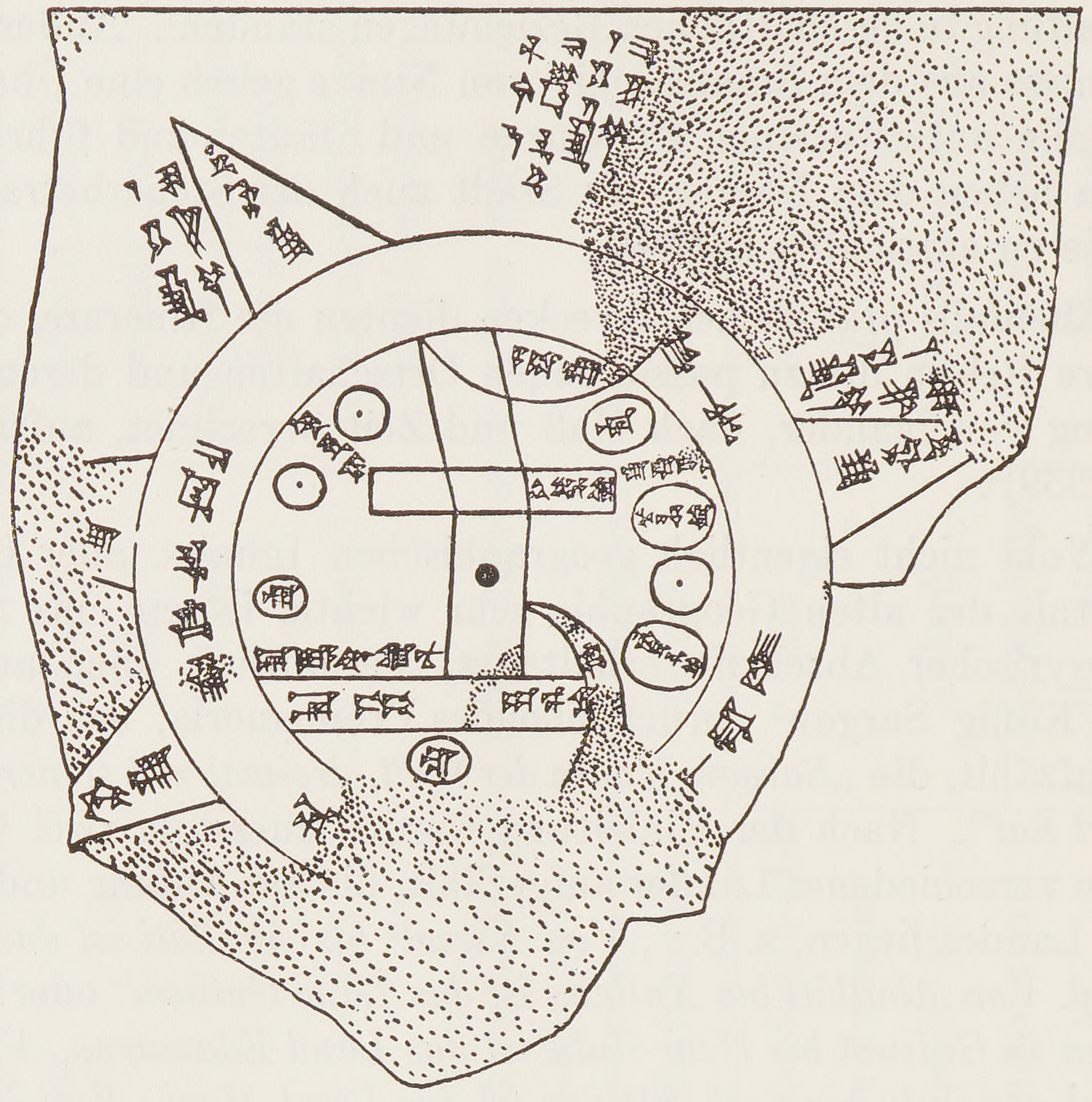
Drawing by B. Meissner in Babylonien und Assyrien, 1925.

The text above the map (11 lines) seems to describe part of the creation of the world by Marduk, the patron god of Babylon, who parted the primeval salt Ocean (the goddess Tiamat) and thus created Land and Sea. Of the Sea it says:

the ruine[d] gods which he (Marduk) set[tled] inside the Sea [...] are present; the viper, the great sea-serpent inside.

Next, on Land, a series of two mythical creatures ("the Anzu-bird, and scorpi[on-man]") and at least fifteen land animals are mentioned, "beasts which Marduk created on top of the res[tl]ess Sea" (i.e. on the land, visualized as a kind of giant raft floating in the Sea), among them mountain goat, gazelle, lion, wolf, monkey and female-monkey, ostrich, cat, and chameleon. With the exception of the cat, all these animals were typical of faraway lands.

The last two lines of the text refer to three legendary heroes: [U]tnapištim (the hero of the Flood as described in Gilgamesh's epic), Sargon (ruler of Akkad), and Nur-[D]agan the King of Buršaḫa[nda] (opponent of Sargon).

==== Back side ====
The back side (29 lines) seems to be a description of (at least) eight nagu. After an introduction, possibly explaining how to identify the first nagu, the next seven nagu are each introduced by the clause "To the n-th region [nagu], where you travel 7 leagues" (the distance of 7 leagues seems to indicate the width of the Ocean, rather than the distance between subsequent nagu).

A short description is given for each of the eight nagu, but those of the first, second, and sixth are too damaged to read. The fifth nagu has the longest description, but this too is damaged and indecipherable. The seventh nagu is more clear:

... where cattle equipped with horns [are ...] they run fast and reach [...]

The third nagu may be a barren desert, impassable even for birds:

A winged [bi]rd cannot safely comp[lete its journey]

In the fourth nagu objects are found of remarkable dimensions:

[...] are thick as a parsiktum-measure, 20 fingers [...]

Irving Finkel assumes that the bird mentioned could be a reference to the author of the map, namely a man who, thanks to his geographical knowledge, was able to imagine the entire known world from a bird's-eye view, as if in flight. He also notes that the parsiktum-measure is known in Babylonian literature exclusively as a specification for Utnapishtim's ark, suggesting that this nagu marks the legendary resting place of this ark. Further, the nagu is a mountain-like triangle close to the Urartu region inside the Bitter River, perhaps equivalent to Mount Ararat, the Biblical resting place of Noah's ark. Irving Finkel | The Ark Before Noah: A Great Adventure.

The eighth nagu may refer to a supposed heavenly gate in the east where the Sun enters as it rises in the morning.

[... the p]lace where [...] dawns at its entrance.

Concluding, the description then states that the map is a bird's eye description:

of the Four Quadrants of the entire [world?] [...] which no one can compre[hend] [i.e., the nagu extend infinitely far]

The last two lines apparently recorded the name of the scribe who wrote the tablet:

[...] copied from its old exemplar and colla[ted ...] the son of Iṣṣuru [the descend]ant of Ea-bēl-il[ī].

The "Great Wall" refers to the nagu, represented by number 18 on Objects on the Babylonian map of the world table. This term refers to a distant earthy region that gained infamy from a past time due to the first ruler of the Akkadian Empire, Sargon of Akkad, who it is said took stones from this mystical distant land. This had significance to Babylonian's at the time because these lands were considered so distant, in our modern view, it could be seen as reaching into outer space.

== The Tablets Influence ==
According to Horowitz the purpose of the tablet was more than just as a map. It had a broader purpose to relate the prominent locations within the Babylonian Empire to distant and far off lands outside of their known world. The tablets circular center focused on the familiar world of Mesopotamia surrounded by the "Bitter River". Beyond the "Bitter River" were far off lands described in the writing on the tablet and were largely mythical in nature. Johannes Haubold points out that several other ancient Babylonian texts reference locations on the map including the "Bitter River", which was often used to reference the sea. The description of the seas as the "Bitter River" was common an ancient Babylonian scrips, especially on royal tablets that detailed the Babylonian conquest of the known world. Haubold goes on to describe how both King Darius and his son Xerxes considered themselves the conquerors of the unknown lands beyond the sea.

Not only was this tablet influential in its own time, but as Carlo Zaccagnini states, the design of the Babylonian map of the world may have influenced the T and O maps of the European Middle Ages. Zaccagnini points out that the distinctive orientation of the tablet as well as its round shape is remarkably similar to the shape and orientation of the Middle Age T and O maps.

== See also ==
- List of cities of the ancient Near East
- Babylonian astronomy

== Sources ==
- Wiggermann, Frans (1996). "Scenes From The Shadow Side". In Vogelzang, M.E.; Vanstiphout, H.L.J. (eds.). Mesopotamian Poetic Language: Sumerian and Akkadian. Styx Publications. pp. 207–230.

== Gallery ==
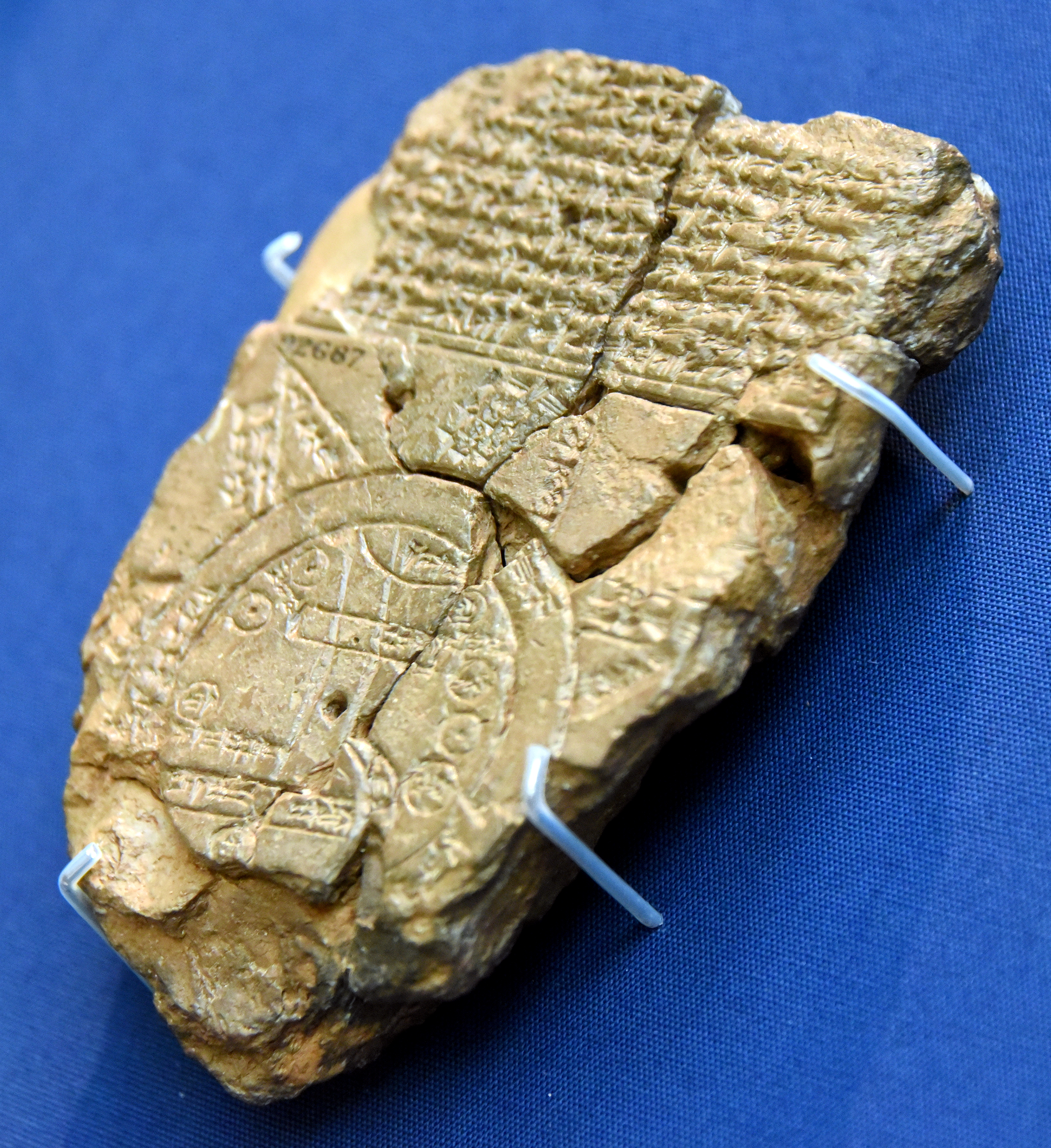
Map of the World from Sippar, Iraq. 6th century BCE. British Museum

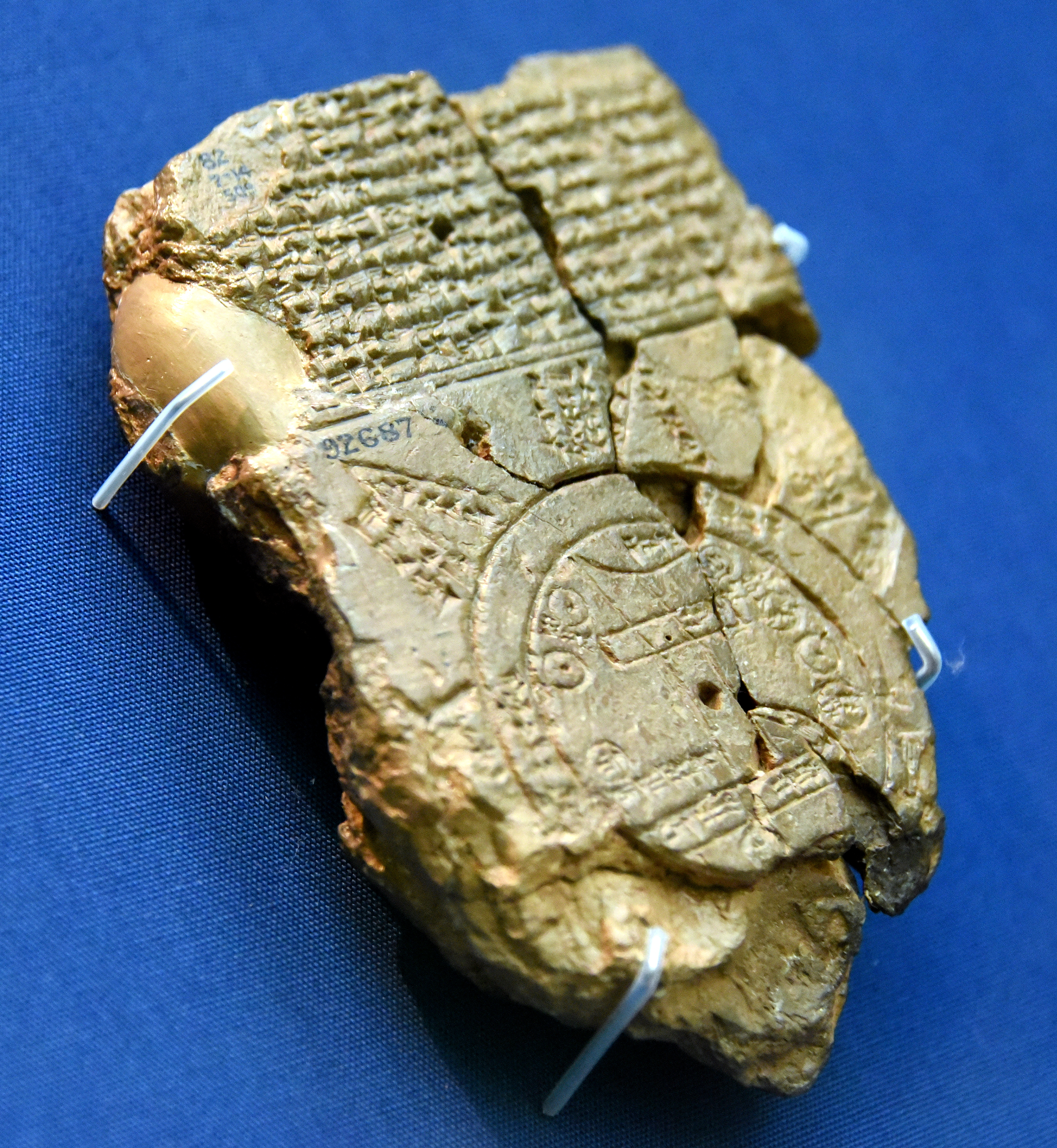
Map of the World from Sippar, Iraq, 6th century BCE. British Museum

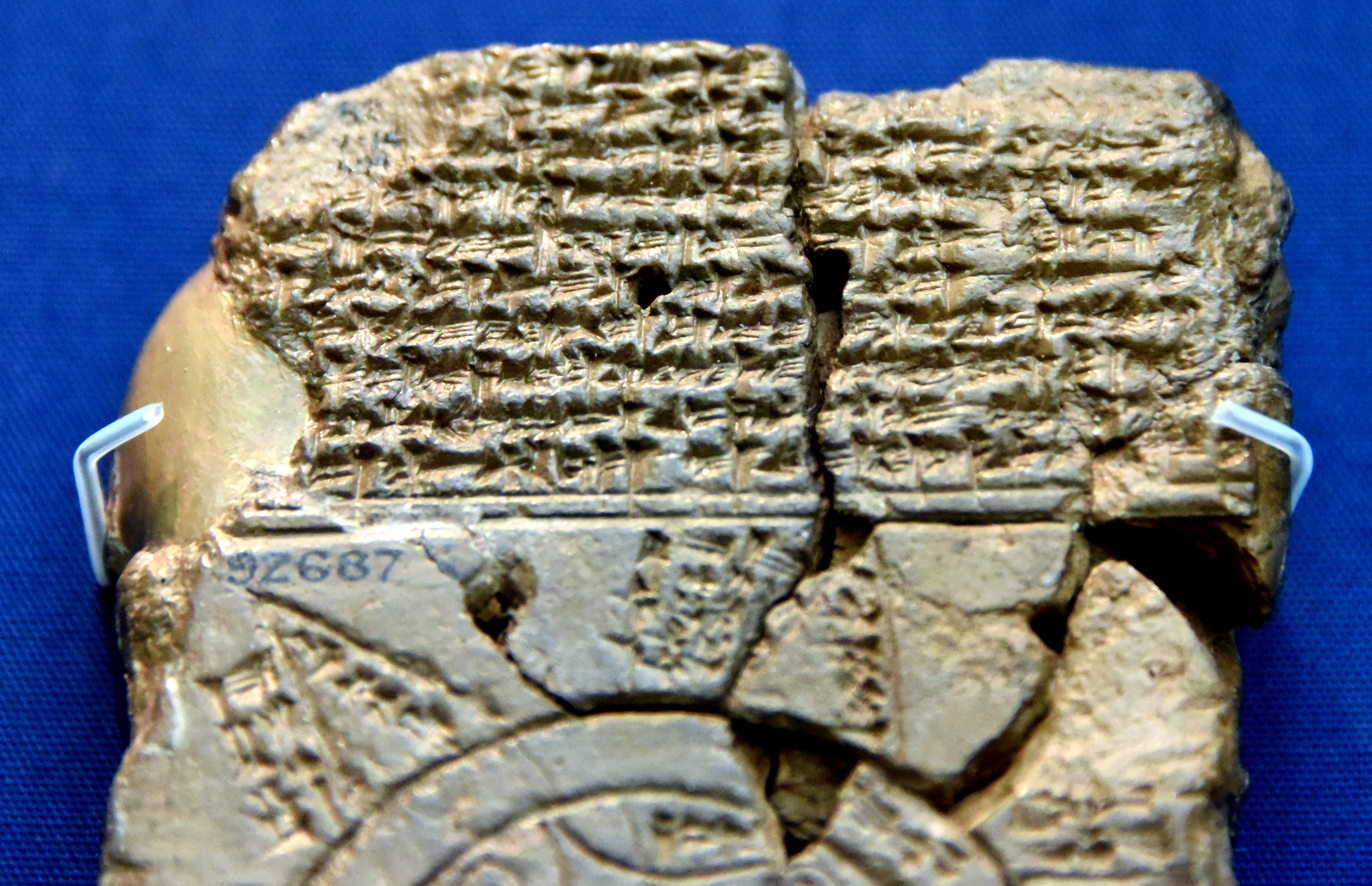
Map of the World from Sippar, Iraq, 6th century BCE. The British Museum
