= Tablet of Shamash =

Stele recovered from Sippa

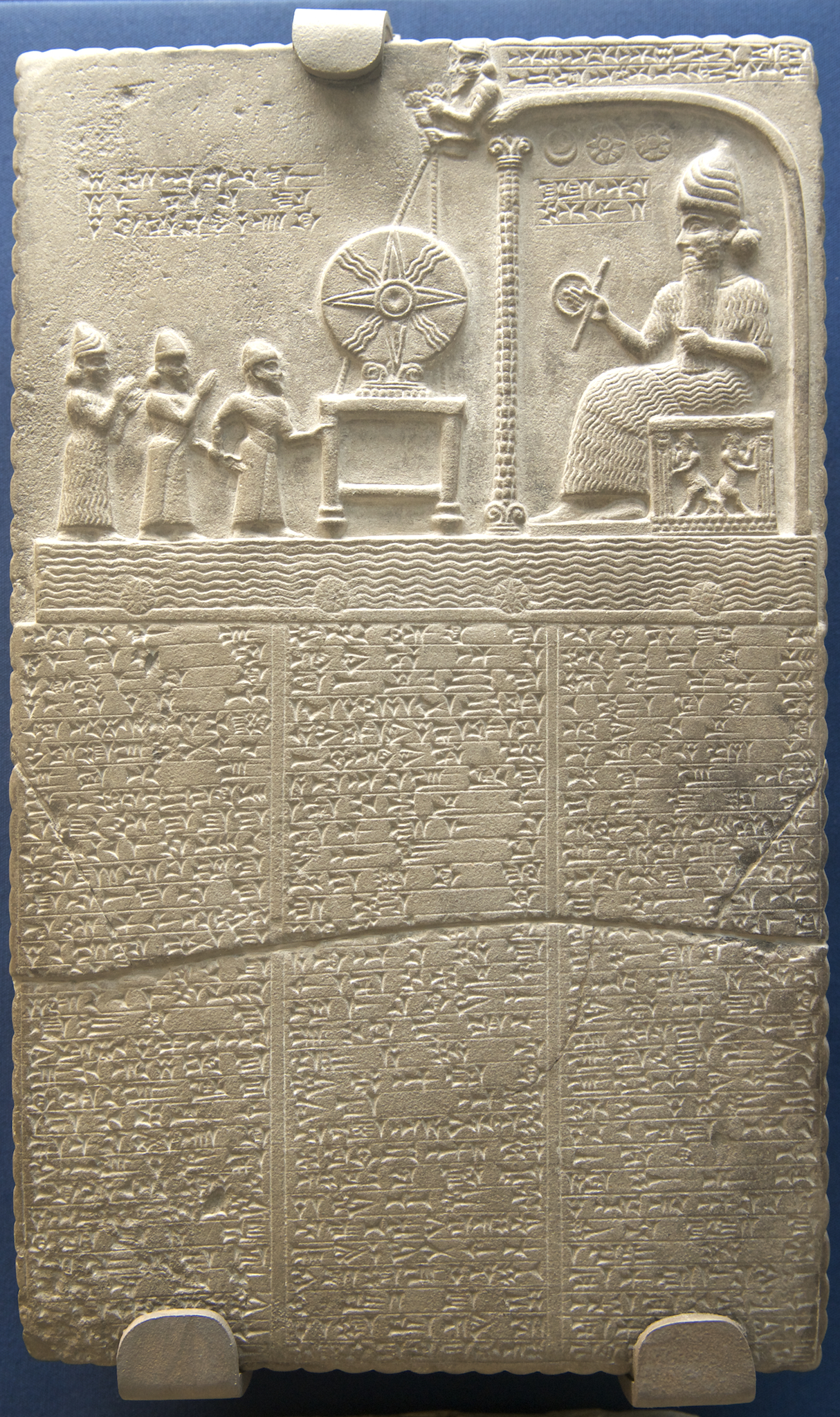
- Tablet of Shamash
- Material: Limestone
- Size: Length: 29.2 cm, Width: 17.8 cm
- Created: 888–855 BC
- Present location: British Museum, London. Room 55.
- Registration: ME 91000

The Tablet of Shamash (also known as the Sun God Tablet or the Nabuapaliddina Tablet) is a stele recovered from the ancient Babylonian city of Sippar in southern Iraq in 1881; it is now a major piece in the British Museum's ancient Middle East collection and is a visual attestation of Babylonian cosmology. It is dated to the reign of King Nabu-apla-iddina ca. 888 – 855 BC.

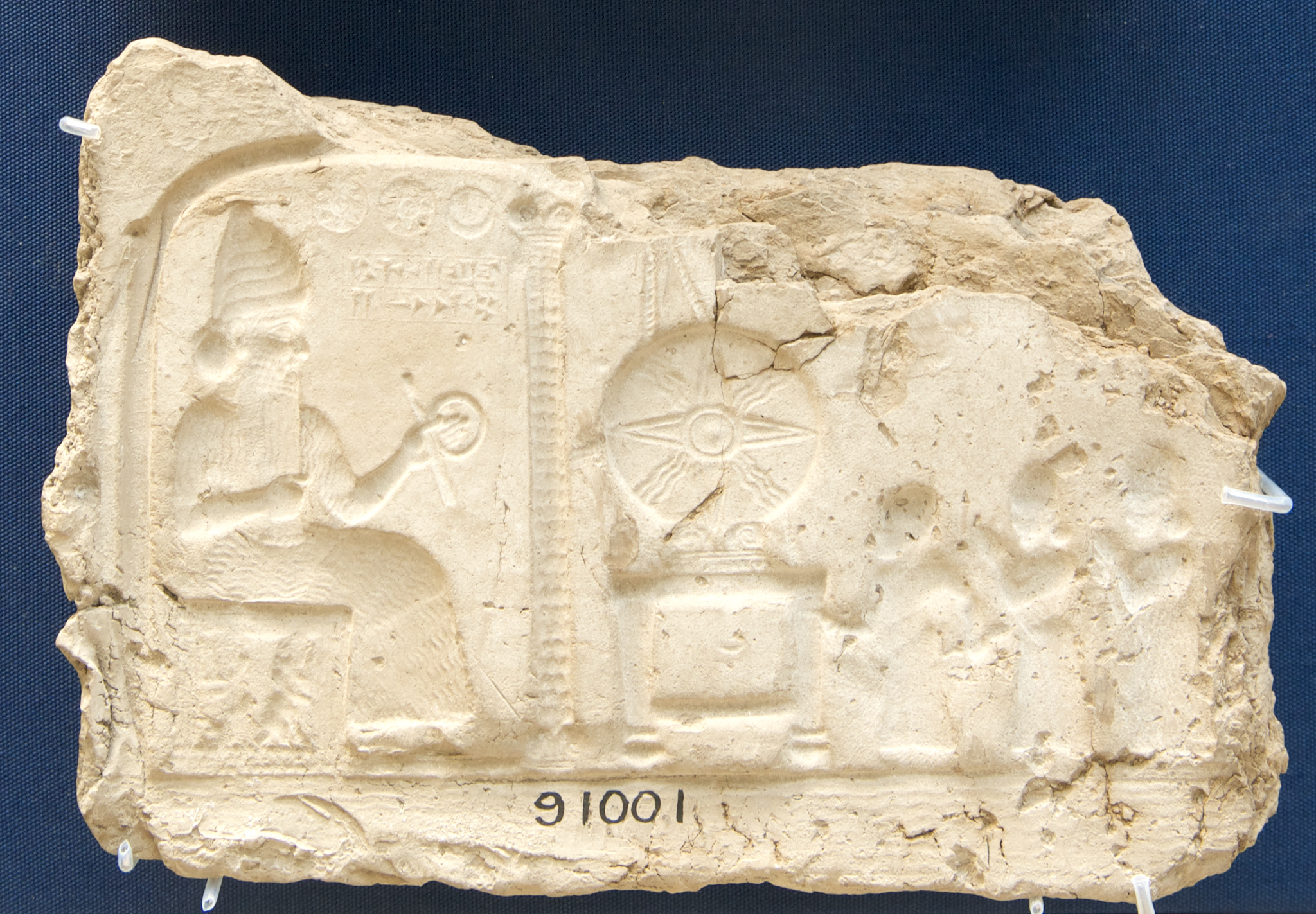
When Nabopolassar discovered the tablet it was enclosed in this fired clay cover originally made by Nabu-apla-iddina. After replacing the cover Nabopolassar buried the original alongside the tablet.

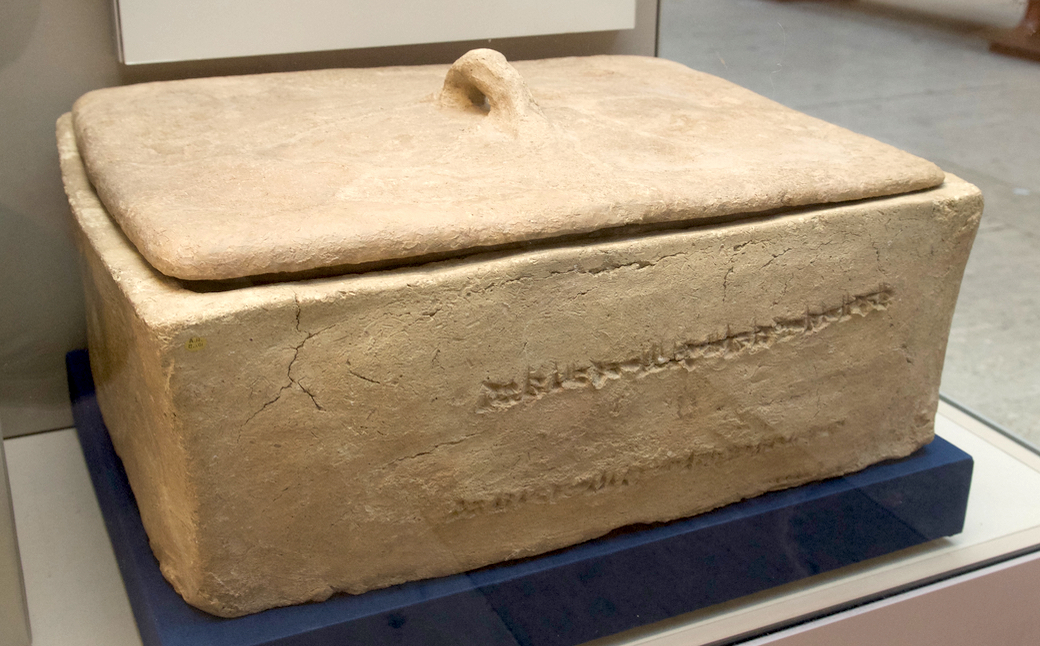
The box in which the tablet of Shamash was discovered.

== Discovery ==
The tablet was discovered during excavations by Hormuzd Rassam between 1878 and 1883. The tablet was found complete but broken into two large and six small pieces. By the time of King Nabopolassar, between 625 and 605 BC, it had broken into four parts and been repaired. The terracotta coffer also contained two clay impressions of the tablet's presentation scene. The coffer was sealed under an asphalt temple floor. It has been suggested that the coffer also contained a second tablet as well as a third clay impression (now in the Istanbul Archaeology Museums).

== Description ==
It was encased in a clay cast or "squeeze" that created impressions when placed over the face of the stone and protected it. This indicates that the tablet was an item of reverence, possibly stored due to newer traditions. The tablet has serrated edges like a saw. The bas-relief on the top of the obverse (pictured) shows Shamash, the Sun God, beneath symbols of the sun, moon and star. Shamash is depicted in a seated position, wearing a horned headdress, holding the rod-and-ring symbol in his right hand. There is another large sun disk in front of him on an altar, suspended from above by two figures. Of the three figures on the left, the central one is dressed in the same fashion as Shamash and is assumed to be the Babylonian king Nabu-apla-iddina receiving the symbols of deity.

The bas relief can be superimposed with two orders of golden rectangles.

== Inscription ==
The scene contains three inscriptions. The first, at the head of the tablet reads:

(1) ṣal-lam (ilu)Šamaš bêlu rabû
(2) a-šib E-babbar-ra
(3) ša ki-rib Sippar(KI)

Translation:

(1) Image of Shamash, the great Lord
(2) who dwells in Ebabbara,
(3) which is in Sippar

Above the sun god a second inscription describes the position of the depicted moon, sun, and star as being over against the heavenly ocean, on which the scene sits:

(1) (ilu)Sin (ilu)Šamaš u (ilu)Ištar ina pu-ut apsî
(2) ina bi-rit ili muš-ti-mi innadû(pl. u)

Translation:

(1) Sin, Shamash and Ishtar are set over against the heavenly ocean
(2) within the divine judge

The final inscription in the scene reads:

(1)agû (ilu)Šamaš
(2) muš-ši do

Translation:

(1) Headdress of Shamash
(2) rod of do.

The cuneiform text beneath the stele is divided into fifteen passages, blending prose, poetic and rhetorical elements in the fashion typical of Mesopotamian royal inscriptions. It tells how Sippar and the Ebabbar temple of Shamash had fallen into disrepair with the loss of the statue of the god. This cult image is temporarily replaced with the solar disk; it is further described how a new figure of Shamash was found in an eastern part of the Euphrates, from which Nabu-apla-iddina has constructed a new statue of lapis lazuli and gold to restore the cult. Similar iconographic and prosaic parallels have been evidenced from Mesopotamian and later Jewish sources where the king who restores the cult is seen like a deity passing on divine symbols. The remainder of the text records the gifts of the royal grant, similar to a kudurru and discusses the practices of the temple, priestly rules, dress codes and regulations.
