= Chaoskampf =

Mythological combat motif

Chaoskampf (German: [ˈkaːɔsˌkampf]; lit. 'the battle against chaos'), or the combat myth, is a widespread mythological motif involving battle between a culture hero deity with a chaos monster, often in the form of a sea serpent or dragon. The term was first used with respect to the destruction of the chaos dragon Tiamat in the Enūma Eliš, although the primeval state is one of a peaceful existence between Abzu and Tiamat and chaos only ensues when Tiamat enters combat with Marduk.

== Definition ==
Today, the Chaoskampf concept is plagued by a lack of consistent definition and use of the term across many studies. Nicolas Wyatt defines the Chaoskampf category as follows:

The Chaoskampf myth is a category of divine combat narratives with cosmogonic overtones, though at times turned secondarily to other purposes, in which the hero god vanquishes a power or powers opposed to him, which generally dwell in, or are identified with, the sea, and are presented as chaotic, dissolutory forces.

It may also be used to refer to a dualistic battle between two gods; in that context, an alternative term that has been proposed is theomachy whereas Chaoskampf may be restrained to refer to cosmic battles in the context of creation. For example, a Chaoskampf may be found in the Enuma Elish (the only surviving ancient near eastern text to place a cosmic battle in the context of a creation narrative), but not in the Baal Cycle or Psalm 74 where a theomachy ensues between Baal/Yahweh and the sea serpent Yam/Leviathan without being followed by creation. The notion of Chaoskampf may be further distinguished from a divine battle between a god and the enemy of his people.

The chaos may be social or economic. In a gift economy, a dragon hoarding treasure or cattle represents a violation of the social contract. Sometimes social violations lead to the battle with the dragon, as in the Homeric Hymn to Apollo when Hera betrayed Zeus by creating Typhon.

== Parallels ==
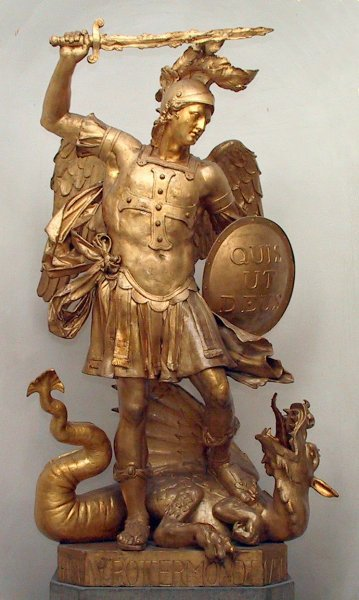
Depiction of the Christianized Chaoskampf: statue of Archangel Michael slaying a dragon. The inscription on the shield reads: Quis ut Deus?

Parallel concepts appear in the Middle East and North Africa, such as the abstract conflict of ideas in the Egyptian duality of Maat and Isfet or the battle of Horus and Set, or the more concrete parallel of the battle of Ra with the chaos serpent Apophis.

=== Old Testament studies ===
Since the classic 1895 German work Schöpfung und Chaos in Urzeit und Endzeit by Hermann Gunkel, various historians in the field of modern biblical studies have associated the theme of chaos in the earlier Babylonian cosmology (and now other cognate narratives from ancient near eastern cosmologies) with the Genesis creation narrative. Besides Genesis, other books of the Old Testament, especially several Psalms, some passages in Isaiah and Jeremiah, and the Book of Job are relevant.

One area of focus has been with respect to the term abyss or tohu wa-bohu in Genesis 1:2. The term may refer to a state of non-being before creation or to a formless state. In the Book of Genesis, the spirit of God is moving upon the face of the waters, displacing the earlier state of the universe which is likened to a "watery chaos" upon which there is choshek (which translated from the Hebrew is darkness/confusion). Some scholars, however, reject the association between biblical creation and notions of chaos from Babylonian and other (such as Chinese) myths. The basis is that the terms themselves in Genesis 1:2 are not semantically related to chaos, and that the entire cosmos exists in a state of chaos in Babylonian, Chinese, and other myths, whereas at most this can be said of the earth in Genesis. The presence of Chaoskampf in the biblical tradition is now contentious.

Jon D. Levenson discussed a process of demythologization in which these accounts of serpent combat myths as a divine creative act are retold in later periods, and was reworked into the creation story of Genesis 1. John Day made the case using Ugaritic evidence and cognates, that Yahweh's conquest over Leviathan was primarily Canaanite in origin and not Babylonian.

== See also ==
- Cosmic ocean – Mythological motif
- Dragon – Legendary creature
- Sea serpent – Type of dragon described in mythology
- Seven-headed serpent – Ancient Sumerian monster
- Trito (Proto-Indo-European mythology) § Serpent-slaying myth
