= Wayne Horowitz =

American-Israeli archeologist

- Born: Roslyn, New York, U.S.

Academic background
- Education: Brandeis University (BA); University of Birmingham (PhD)
- Thesis: Mesopotamian Cosmic Geography (1986)
- Doctoral advisor: W. G. Lambert

Academic work
- Discipline: Assyriology
- Sub-discipline: Mesopotamian astronomy, ancient Near Eastern cosmology, cuneiform studies
- Institutions: Hebrew University of Jerusalem
- Main interests: Ancient Near East, Mesopotamian cosmic geography, cuneiform texts from ancient Israel
- Notable works: Mesopotamian Cosmic Geography (1998); Cuneiform in Canaan (2006)

Wayne Horowitz is an American-Israeli Assyriologist and professor at the Hebrew University of Jerusalem. He specializes in Mesopotamian astronomy, ancient Near Eastern cosmology, and the study of cuneiform texts from ancient Israel. His research on Sumerian and Akkadian cuneiform texts dealing with the structure of the cosmos is considered authoritative in the field.

== Early life and education ==
Horowitz was born in Roslyn, New York. He earned his Bachelor of Arts degree in Classical and Oriental Studies (Greek, Hebrew, Arabic, and Akkadian) from Brandeis University, graduating summa cum laude with highest honors and election to Phi Beta Kappa. It was at Brandeis that he first encountered the Ancient Near East and cuneiform script, deciding to pursue further studies in the field.

After a year at the University of California, Berkeley, Horowitz moved to England to study under W. G. Lambert at the University of Birmingham and to work with the cuneiform tablet collection at the British Museum. He completed his PhD in 1986 with a dissertation on Mesopotamian cosmic geography, examining representations of the physical universe—heaven, earth, and the underworld—in Sumerian and Akkadian cuneiform sources.

== Career ==
Following completion of his doctorate in 1986, Horowitz and his family immigrated to Israel as olim (Jewish immigrants). He began his career at the Hebrew University of Jerusalem, where he has taught for nearly four decades. He holds the position of Professor of Assyriology in the Institute of Archaeology and has served as Academic Advisor in both undergraduate and graduate programs at the Rothberg International School.

Horowitz has held visiting professorships at the Chinese University of Hong Kong (2008) and Northeast Normal University in Changchun, China (2006–2007). In 2012, he was a Townsend Fellow at the University of California, Berkeley.

=== Research ===
Horowitz's primary research focuses on Mesopotamian representations of the cosmos. His 1998 monograph Mesopotamian Cosmic Geography, based on his doctoral dissertation, remains a standard reference work in the field.

His second major area of research involves the study and publication of cuneiform documents discovered in the Land of Israel. This work began in the 1990s with an invitation to study newly discovered tablets at Hazor and expanded into a comprehensive project to collect and publish all known cuneiform texts from ancient Israel. In 2006, he and Takayoshi Oshima published Cuneiform in Canaan, the definitive collection of these texts. Horowitz has also published the first cuneiform tablets ever discovered in Jerusalem.

In 2010, Horowitz led the team that deciphered a law code fragment (18th–17th century BCE) discovered at Hazor—the first such text found in Israel showing features similar to the Code of Hammurabi.

Horowitz has contributed to Jewish history through his work with the Bible Lands Museum Jerusalem on the Al-Yahudu archive—administrative tablets from the "City of the Jews," a Judean community in southern Babylonia dating to the 570s BCE that document life during the early Babylonian exile.

More recently, Horowitz has pursued comparative research on astronomical traditions, conducting fieldwork with Gwich'in First Nations communities in Canada's Yukon and Northwest Territories, funded by the Halbert Centre for Canadian Studies. He has lectured on this research under the title "What I Learned About Being Jewish in the Canadian Arctic."

== Selected publications ==
=== Books ===
- Mesopotamian Cosmic Geography. Winona Lake, IN: Eisenbrauns, 1998. ISBN 978-0931464997
- A Catalogue of Cuneiform Tablets in the Birmingham City Museum, with P. Watson. Volume 1 (1986); Volume 2 (1993).
- Cuneiform in Canaan: Cuneiform Sources from the Land of Israel in Ancient Times, with Takayoshi Oshima. Jerusalem: Israel Exploration Society, 2006.
- Writing Science Before the Greeks: A Naturalistic Analysis of the Babylonian Astronomical Treatise MUL.APIN, with Rita Watson. Leiden: Brill, 2011.
- The Three Stars Each: The Astrolabes and Related Texts. Vienna: Archiv für Orientforschung, Beiheft 33, 2014.

=== Selected articles ===
- "The Babylonian Map of the World." Iraq 47 (1988): 147–165.
- with A. Shaffer, "An Administrative Tablet from Hazor: A Preliminary Edition." Israel Exploration Journal 42 (1992): 21–33.
- with V. Hurowitz, "Urim and Thummim in Light of a Psephomancy Ritual from Assur (LKA 137)." Journal of Ancient Near Eastern Studies 21 (1992): 95–115.
- "Mesopotamian Accounts of Creation." In Encyclopedia of Cosmology, ed. N. Hetherington. Garland Press, 1993, pp. 387–397.
- with Takayoshi Oshima and Seth Sanders, "A Bibliographical List of Cuneiform Inscriptions from Canaan, Palestine/Philistia, and The Land of Israel." Journal of the American Oriental Society 122 (2002): 753–766.
- with E. Mazar, T. Oshima, and Y. Goren, "A Cuneiform Tablet from the Ophel in Jerusalem." Israel Exploration Journal 60 (2010): 4–21.

== Professional service ==
- Associate Editor, Journal of the Ancient Near Eastern Society
- Associate Editor, Journal of Ancient Civilizations
- Editorial Board Member, Review of Biblical Literature, Society of Biblical Literature
- Academic Advisory Committee, Bible Lands Museum Jerusalem

== Awards and honors ==
- Gerald A. Soffen Memorial Fund Award
- Townsend Fellowship, Doreen B. Townsend Center for the Humanities, University of California, Berkeley (2012)
- Halbert Centre Faculty Research Exchange Program Grant (2012)

== See also ==
- Babylonian astronomy
- Cuneiform
- Tel Hazor
- Code of Hammurabi
