= Ancient Near Eastern cosmology =

The cosmology of the ancient Near East denotes the beliefs concerning the universe's origin, evolution, and structure that prevailed in the ancient Near East, an area equivalent to the modern Middle East and encompassing Mesopotamia, Egypt, Persia, the Levant, Anatolia, and the Arabian Peninsula. Premodern cosmology in this region featured a flat earth, a solid firmament above the sky, a cosmic ocean above that, a divine realm above the ocean, and a netherworld at the bottom. Creation myths explained where the universe came from, including which gods created it (and how), as well as how humanity was created. These beliefs are attested as early as the fourth millennium BC and dominated until the modern era, with the only major competing system being the Hellenistic cosmology that developed in Ancient Greece in the mid-1st millennium BC.

Geographically, these views are known from the Mesopotamian cosmologies from Babylonia, Sumer, and Akkad; the Levantine or West Semitic cosmologies from Ugarit and ancient Israel and Judah (the biblical cosmology); the Egyptian cosmology from Ancient Egypt; and the Anatolian cosmologies from the Hittites. This system of cosmology went on to have a profound influence on views in early Greek cosmology, later Jewish cosmology, patristic cosmology, and Islamic cosmology (including Quranic cosmology).

== Summary ==
The cosmology of the ancient Near East can be divided into cosmography, the understanding of the physical structure and features of the cosmos, and cosmogony, the creation myths describing the origins of the cosmos. The cosmos and the gods were also related, as cosmic bodies like heaven, earth, the stars were believed to be and/or personified as gods, and the sizes of the gods were frequently described as being of cosmic proportions.

=== Cosmography (structure of the cosmos) ===
The many civilizations of the ancient Near East shared most of their main views about the structure of the cosmos, a situation which held for thousands of years. Widely held beliefs about cosmography included:

- a flat earth and a solid heaven (firmament), both of which are disk-shaped
- a primordial cosmic ocean. When the firmament is created, it separates the cosmic ocean into two bodies of water:
  - the heavenly upper waters located on top of the firmament, which act as a source of rain
  - the lower waters that the earth is above and that the earth rests on; they act as the source of rivers, springs, and other earthly bodies of water
- the region above the upper waters, namely the abode of the gods
- the netherworld, the furthest region in the direction downwards, below the lower waters

Paul Keyser categorizes the cosmology of the ancient Near East into a larger, cross-cultural group of cosmologies that he calls a "cradle cosmology", and Keyser suggests an even larger number of shared features between them all.

Some misconceptions are held about Near Eastern cosmography. One misconception is the idea that ziggurats were considered cosmic objects that reached all the way up to heaven. Another misconception is that the firmament was shaped like a dome or a vault, whereas in reality, it was believed to be flat.

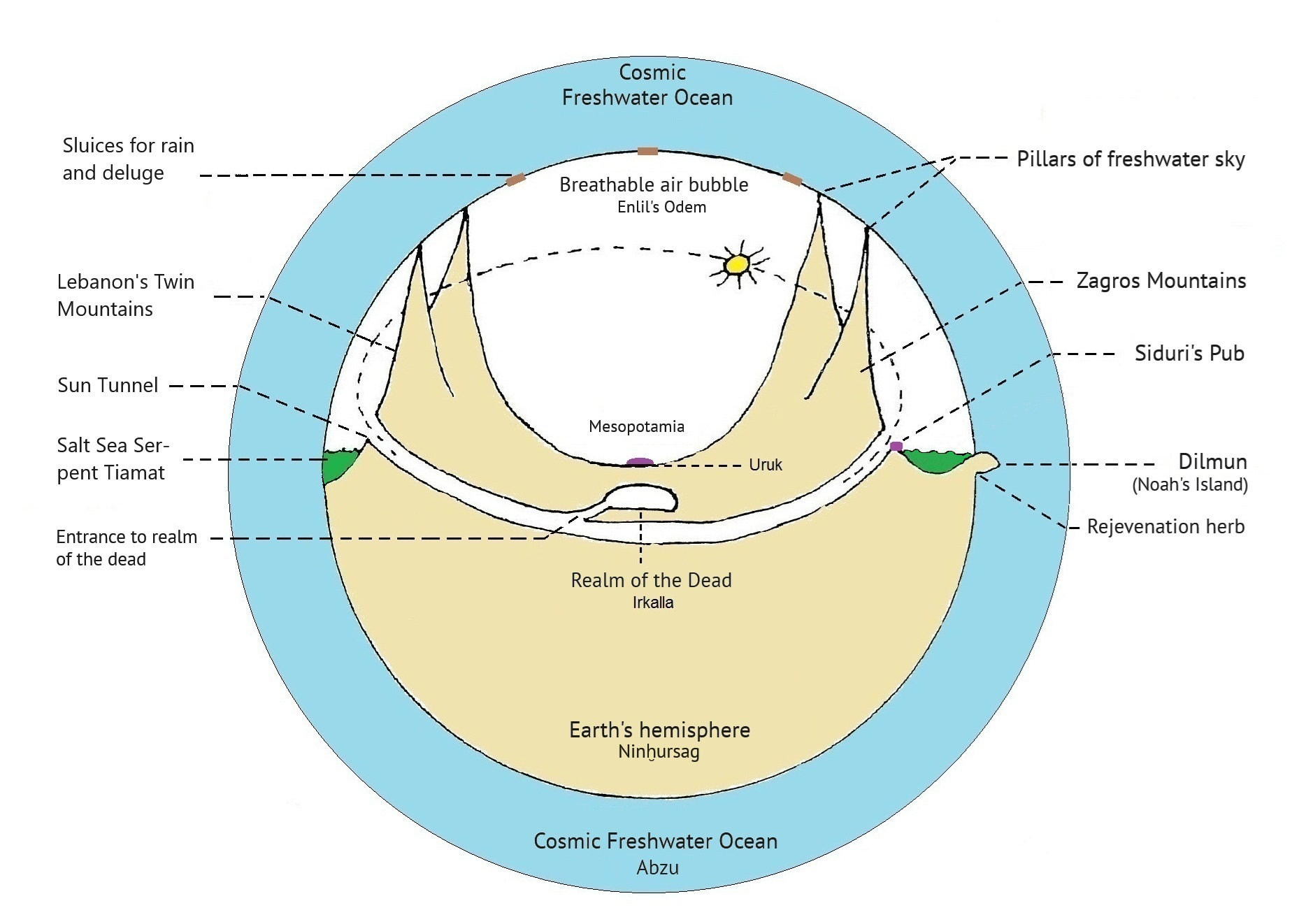
Modern reconstruction of a Babylonian cosmographic model, showing the earth, surrounding waters, heavens, and underworld. Follows the path Gilgamesh takes in the Epic of Gilgamesh.

Another controversy concerns whether the ancients thought this cosmography was literal or observational (phenomenological). John Hilber argues that ancient Near Eastern cosmography was not phenomenological for many reasons, including: based on the descriptions provided by cosmological texts, that non-cosmological texts assume the reality of this cosmography (like in incantations), anthropological studies showing that there are primitive cosmologies still believed in today and that these are not phenomenological, and that there is a cognitive expectation that humans will construct models to explain the observations they make, and that the cosmography described in cosmological texts would have played this role.

A 12th-century BC limestone Kudurru from Susa, dating to the late Kassite period, maps the cosmos in five levels: an upper ocean; beneath it, heaven, where gods are identified with stars and constellations; then the earth, populated by humans, animals, and plants; below that, the netherworld's citadel, upheld by towers or pillars; and underneath, a lower ocean.

=== Cosmogony (creation of the cosmos) ===
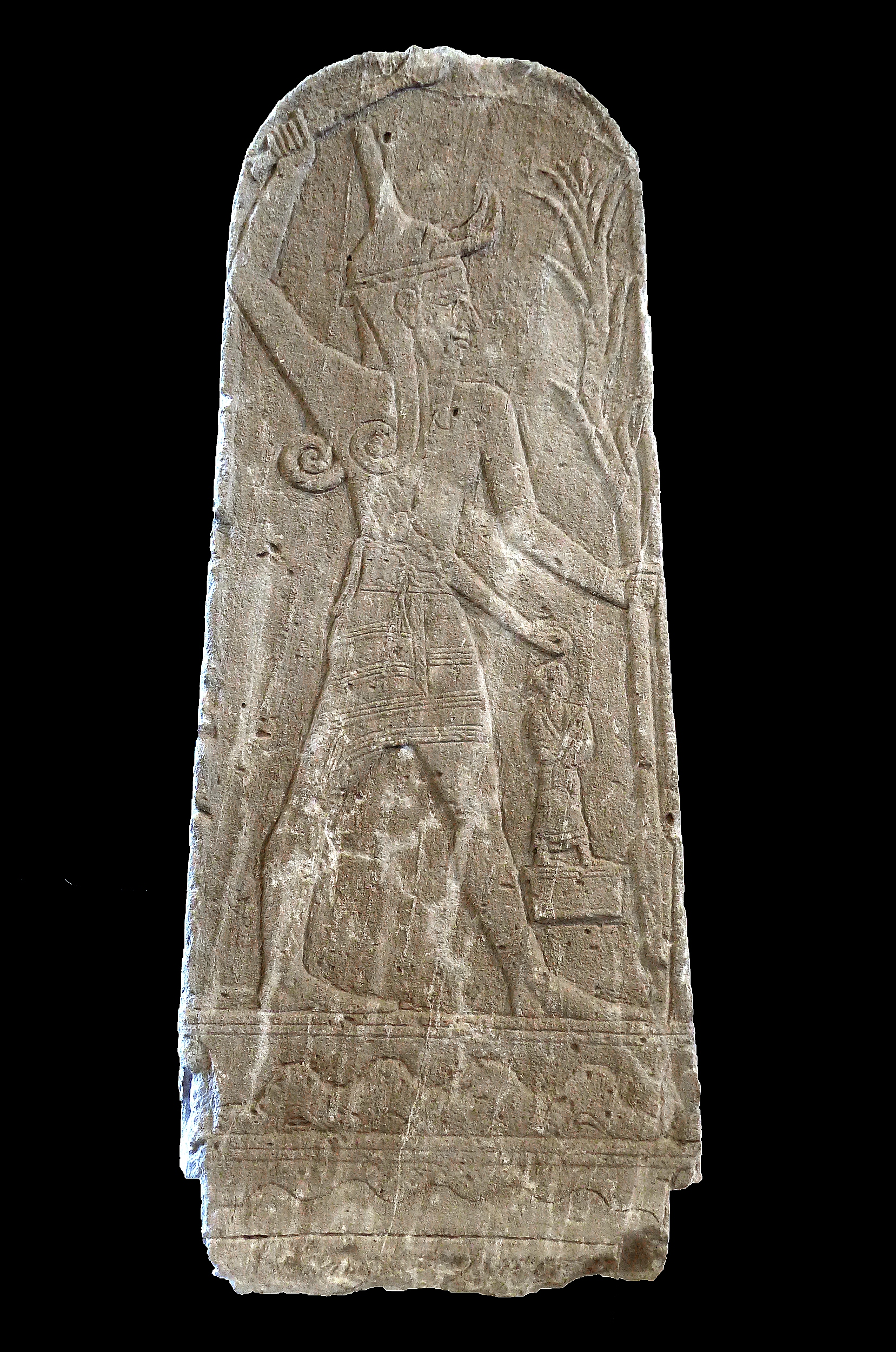
The Ugaritic Baal stele, showing the storm god Baal, whose conflict with Sea/Yam belongs to the wider Near Eastern pattern of divine combat myths.

Many widely held beliefs permeated the creation myths of ancient Near Eastern cosmogony:

- Creatio ex materia from a primordial state of chaos; (Note: On occasion, the Egyptian Memphite Theology and the Genesis creation narrative have been interpreted as supporting creatio ex nihilo. Though this is in dispute, other texts in the Hebrew Bible passages, including the Book of Isaiah, Book of Proverbs (8:24), and the Psalms (90:2; 102:25–27) have also been proposed to be in support creation ex nihilo.) that is, the organization of the world from pre-existing, unordered and unformed (hence chaotic) elements, represented by a primordial body of water
- the presence of a divine creator
- the Chaoskampf motif: a cosmic battle between the protagonist and a primordial sea monster (Note: The widespread nature of this motif is, however, in dispute. David Tsumura relegates Chaoskampf to one creation narrative (the Enuma Elish). Nicolas Wyatt defines it and sees it more expansively, but at the same time, does not interpret it as a battle between "good" and "evil".)
- the separation of undifferentiated elements (to create heaven and earth)
- the creation of mankind

Lisman uses the broader category of "Beginnings" to encompass three separate though inter-related categories: the beginning of the cosmos (cosmogony), the beginning of the gods (theogony), and the beginning of humankind (anthropogeny).

There is evidence that Mesopotamian creation myths reached as far as Pre-Islamic Arabia.

== Cosmos ==
=== Overview ===
The Mesopotamian cosmos can be understood as multiple planes of existence, layered above one another. The highest plane of existence was heaven, which was the home of the sky god Anu. Below heaven was the atmosphere which ranged from the bottom of heaven (or the lowermost firmament) to the ground that humans walk on. This region between heaven and earth was inhabited by Enlil, the king of the gods in Sumerian mythology. Below the ground was the cosmic ocean, and this was believed to be the place of residence of the sibling deities Enki and Ninhursag. The lowest plane of existence was the underworld. Other deities inhabited these planes of existence even if they did not reign over them, such as the sun and moon gods. In later Babylonian accounts, the god Marduk alone ascends to the top rank of the pantheon and rules over all domains of the cosmos. The three-tiered cosmos (sky-earth-underworld) is found in Egyptian artwork on coffin lids and burial chambers.

==== Terminology ====
There were many ways to speak about or refer to the totality of the world, equivalent to contemporary words like "cosmos" or "universe". This included phrases like "heaven and earth" or "heaven and underworld". Terms like "all" or "totality" similarly connoted the entire universe. These ideas are found in hymns and royal inscriptions found in temples. Temples symbolized cosmic structures that reached heaven at their height and the underworld at their depths/foundations. Surviving evidence does not specify the exact physical bounds of the cosmos or what lies beyond the region described in the texts.

==== Unity ====
Mythical bonds, akin to ropes or cables, played the role of cohesively holding the entire world and all its layers of heaven and Earth together. These are sometimes called the "bonds of heaven and earth". They can be referred to with terminology like durmāhu (typically referring to a strong rope made of reeds), markaṣu (referring to a rope or cable, of a boat, for example), or ṣerretu (lead-rope passed through an animals nose). A deity can hold these ropes as a symbol of their authority, such as the goddess Ishtar "who holds the connecting link of all heaven and earth (or netherworld)". This motif extended to descriptions of great cities like Babylon which was called the "bond of [all] the lands," or Nippur which was "bond of heaven and earth," and some temples as well.

==== Center ====
The idea of a center to the cosmos played a role in elevating the status of whichever place was chosen as the cosmic center and in reflecting beliefs of the finite and closed nature of the cosmos. Babylon was described as the center of the Babylonian cosmos. In parallel, Jerusalem became "the navel of the earth" (Ezekiel 38:12). The finite nature of the cosmos was also suggested to the ancients by the periodic and regular movements of the heavenly bodies in the visible vicinity of the Earth.

=== Heaven and earth ===
"Heaven and earth" was a common phrase to the refer to the entire cosmos, describing it by its two main parts. Sometimes, a third region was added to refer to the entire cosmos in addition to these two, usually the netherworld or the region between heaven and earth. Heaven was believed to be located in the direction up (the word "heavenward" was synonymous with "upward"). It was the dwelling place of the gods, whereas earth was the dwelling place for humans. "Earth" means the land and the sea, but sometimes, it only means land (the terrestrial regions inhabited by humans and where they grew vegetation). The word heaven could refer to the general plane upwards inaccessible to humans, but often, it specifically means the firmament (a solid celestial barrier believed to be located above the sky). Although the gods and humans live in the two different planes of the cosmos in the present, some creation mythologies held that gods and humans once co-existed in the primordial past. In some myths, gods could dwell at the extreme ends of the earth, still beyond human reach. Temples could function as a cosmic axis that united the heavenly and earthly planes.

==== Three heavens and earths ====
In Mesopotamian cosmology, heaven and earth both had a three-part (tripartite) structure: a Lower Heaven/Earth, a Middle Heaven/Earth, and an Upper Heaven/Earth. The Upper Earth was where humans existed. Middle Earth, corresponding to the Abzu (primeval underworldly ocean), was the residence of the god Enki. Lower Earth, the Mesopotamian underworld, was where the 600 Anunnaki gods lived, associated with the land of the dead ruled by Nergal. As for the heavens: the highest level was populated by 300 Igigi (great gods), the middle heaven belonged to the Igigi and also contained Marduk's throne, and the lower heaven was where the stars and constellations were inscribed into. The extent of the Babylonian universe therefore corresponded to a total of six layers spanning across heaven and Earth. Notions of the plurality of heaven and earth are no later than the 2nd millennium BC and may be elaborations of earlier and simpler cosmographies. One text (KAR 307) describes the cosmos in the following manner, with each of the three floors of heaven being made of a different type of stone:

30 “The Upper Heavens are Luludānītu stone. They belong to Anu. He (i.e. Marduk) settled the 300 Igigū (gods) inside. 31 The Middle Heavens are Saggilmud stone. They belong to the Igīgū (gods). Bēl (i.e. Marduk) sat on the high throne within, 32 the lapis lazuli sanctuary. And made a lamp? of electrum shine inside (it). 33 The Lower Heavens are jasper. They belong to the stars. He drew the constellations of the gods on them. 34 In the ... .... of the Upper Earth, he lay down the spirits of mankind. 35 [In the ...] of the Middle earth, he settled Ea, his father. 36 [.....] . He did not let the rebellion be forgotten. 37 [In the ... of the Lowe]r earth, he shut inside 600 Anunnaki. 38 [.......] ... [.... in]side jasper.

Another text (AO 8196) offers a slightly different arrangement, with the Igigi in the upper heaven instead of the middle heaven, and with Bel placed in the middle heaven. Both agree on the placement of the stars in the lower heaven. Exodus 24:9–10 identifies the floor of heaven as being like sapphire, which may correspond to the blue lapis lazuli floor in KAR 307, chosen potentially for its correspondence to the visible color of the sky. One hypothesis holds that the belief that the firmament is made of stone (or a metal, such as iron in Egyptian texts) arises from the observation that meteorites, which are composed of this substance, fall from the firmament.

==== Seven heavens and earths ====
Certain writings mention seven heavens and seven earths; within Mesopotamian tradition, however, the figure probably signifies the entirety of the cosmos, carrying magical or numerological weight, not a literal tally of heavens and earths. Israelite texts do not mention the notion of seven heavens or earths.

=== Firmament ===
The firmament was believed to be a solid boundary above the Earth, separating it from the upper or celestial waters. In the Book of Genesis, it is called the raqia. In ancient Egyptian texts, and from texts across the Near East generally, the firmament was described as having special doors or gateways on the eastern and western horizons to allow for the passage of heavenly bodies during their daily journeys. These were known as the windows of heaven or the gates of heaven. Canaanite text describe Baal as exerting his control over the world by controlling the passage of rainwater through the heavenly windows in the firmament. In Egyptian texts particularly, these gates also served as conduits between the earthly and heavenly realms for which righteous people could ascend. The gateways could be blocked by gates to prevent entry by the deceased as well. As such, funerary texts included prayers enlisting the help of the gods to enable the safe ascent of the dead. Ascent to the celestial realm could also be done by a celestial ladder made by the gods. Multiple stories exist in Mesopotamian texts whereby certain figures ascend to the celestial realm and are given the secrets of the gods.

Four different Egyptian models of the firmament and/or the heavenly realm are known. One model was that it was the shape of a bird: the firmament above represented the underside of a flying falcon, with the sun and moon representing its eyes, and its flapping causing the wind that humans experience. The second was a cow, as per the Book of the Heavenly Cow. The cosmos is a giant celestial cow represented by the goddess Nut or Hathor. The cow consumed the sun in the evening and rebirthed it in the next morning. The third is a celestial woman, also represented by Nut. The heavenly bodies would travel across her body from east to west. The midriff of Nut was supported by Shu (the air god) and Geb (the earth god) lay outstretched between the arms and feet of Nut. Nut consumes the celestial bodies from the west and gives birth to them again in the following morning. Stars cover Nut's belly; one must identify with a star or constellation to join them after death. The fourth model was a flat (or slightly convex) celestial plane which, depending on the text, was thought to be supported in various ways: by pillars, staves, scepters, or mountains at the extreme ends of the Earth. The four supports give rise to the motif of the "four corners of the world".

=== Earth ===
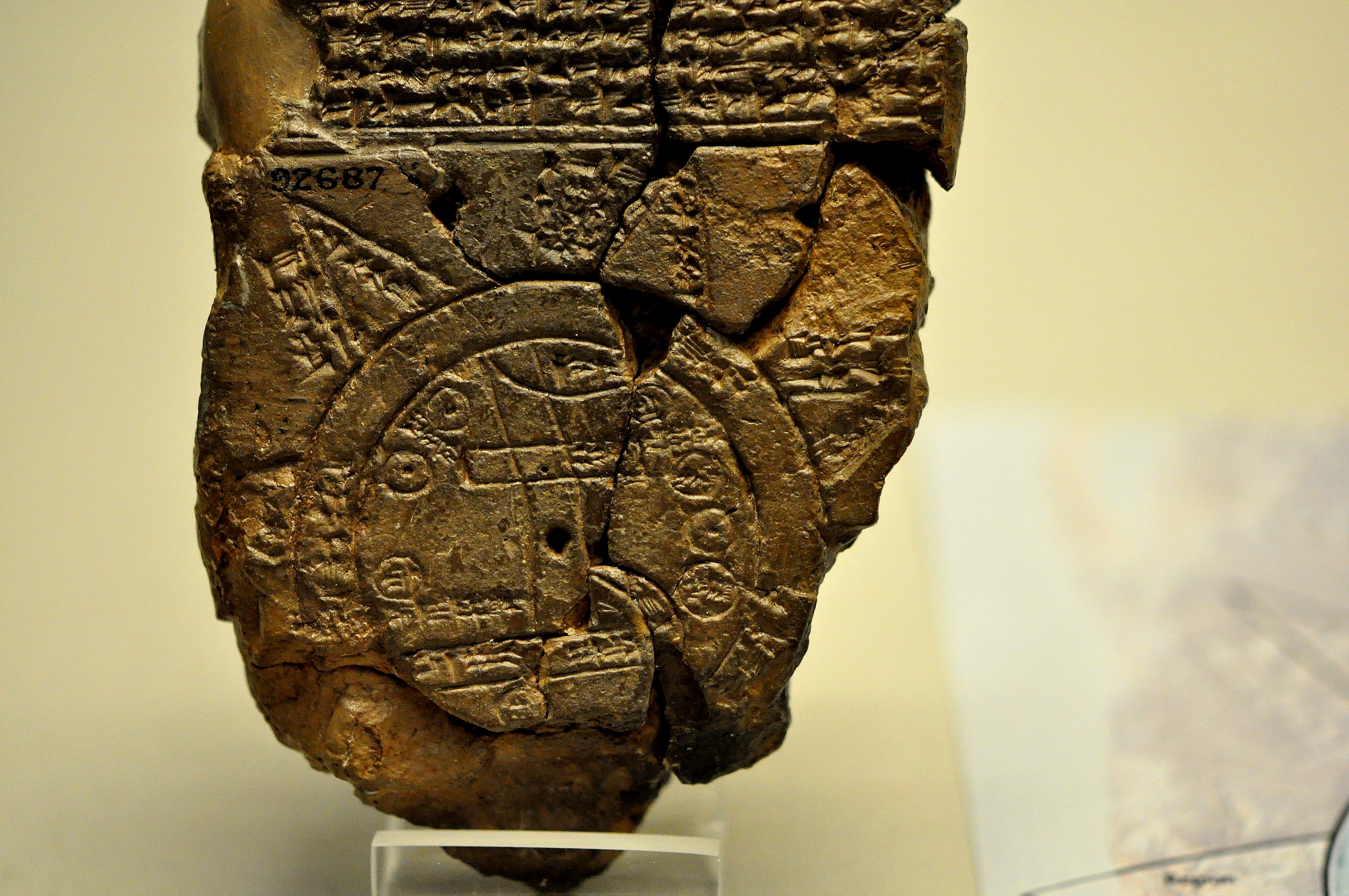
Babylonian Map of the World

The ancient Near Eastern earth was a single-continent disk resting on a body of water sometimes compared to a raft. An aerial view of the cosmography of the earth is pictorially elucidated by the Babylonian Map of the World. Here, the city Babylon is near the Earth's center and it is on the Euphrates river. Other kingdoms and cities surround it. The north is covered by an enormous mountain range, akin to a wall. This mountain range was traversed in some hero myths, such as the Epic of Gilgamesh where Gilgamesh travels past it to an area only accessible by gods and other great heroes. The furthest and most remote parts of the earth were believed to be inhabited by fantastic creatures. In the Babylonian Map, the world continent is surrounded by a bitter salt-water Ocean (called marratu, or "salt-sea") akin to Oceanus described by the poetry of Homer and Hesiod in early Greek cosmology, as well as the statement in the Bilingual Creation of the World by Marduk that Marduk created the first dry land surrounded by a cosmic sea. Egyptian cosmology appears to have also shared this view, as one of the words used for sea, shen-wer, means "great encircler". World-encircling oceans are also found in the Fara tablet VAT 12772 from the 3rd millennium BC and the Myth of Etana.

==== Four corners of the earth ====
Texts mention the four corners of the world, referring to the extremities of the world. A common title among powerful kings who ascribed to themselves that they ruled over this area was King of the Four Corners. For example, Hammurabi (ca. 1810–1750 BC) received the title of "King of Sumer and Akkad, King of the Four Quarters of the World". Monarchs of the Assyrian empire like Ashurbanipal also took on this title. Despite implying a square or rectangular shape, the title denotes the four quadrants of a circle meeting at the world's center. The "four corners" motif also occurs in biblical texts, including Isaiah 11:12.

In Greco-Roman and Jewish literature, the phrase "ends of the earth" referred to the outermost points of the earth that terminated at Oceanus, the outer ocean circling around the earth disc. The furthest point south was identified with Ethiopia and Sheba, and to the West, Spain, specifically the city of Gades.

==== Cosmic mountain ====
According to iconographic and literary evidence, the cosmic mountain, known as Mashu in the Epic of Gilgamesh, was thought to be located at or extend to both the westernmost and easternmost points of the earth, where the sun could rise and set respectively. As such, the model may be called a bi-polar model of diurnal solar movement. The gates for the rising and setting of the sun were also located at Mashu. Some accounts have Mashu as a tree growing at the center of the earth with roots descending into the underworld and a peak reaching to heaven. The cosmic mountain is also found in Egyptian cosmology, as Pyramid Text 1040c says that the mountain ranges on the eastern and western sides of the Nile act as the "two supports of the sky." In the Baal Cycle, two cosmic mountains exist at the horizon acting as the point through which the sun rises from and sets into the underworld (Mot). The tradition of the twin cosmic mountains may also lie behind Zechariah 6:1.

=== Heavenly bodies ===
==== Sun ====
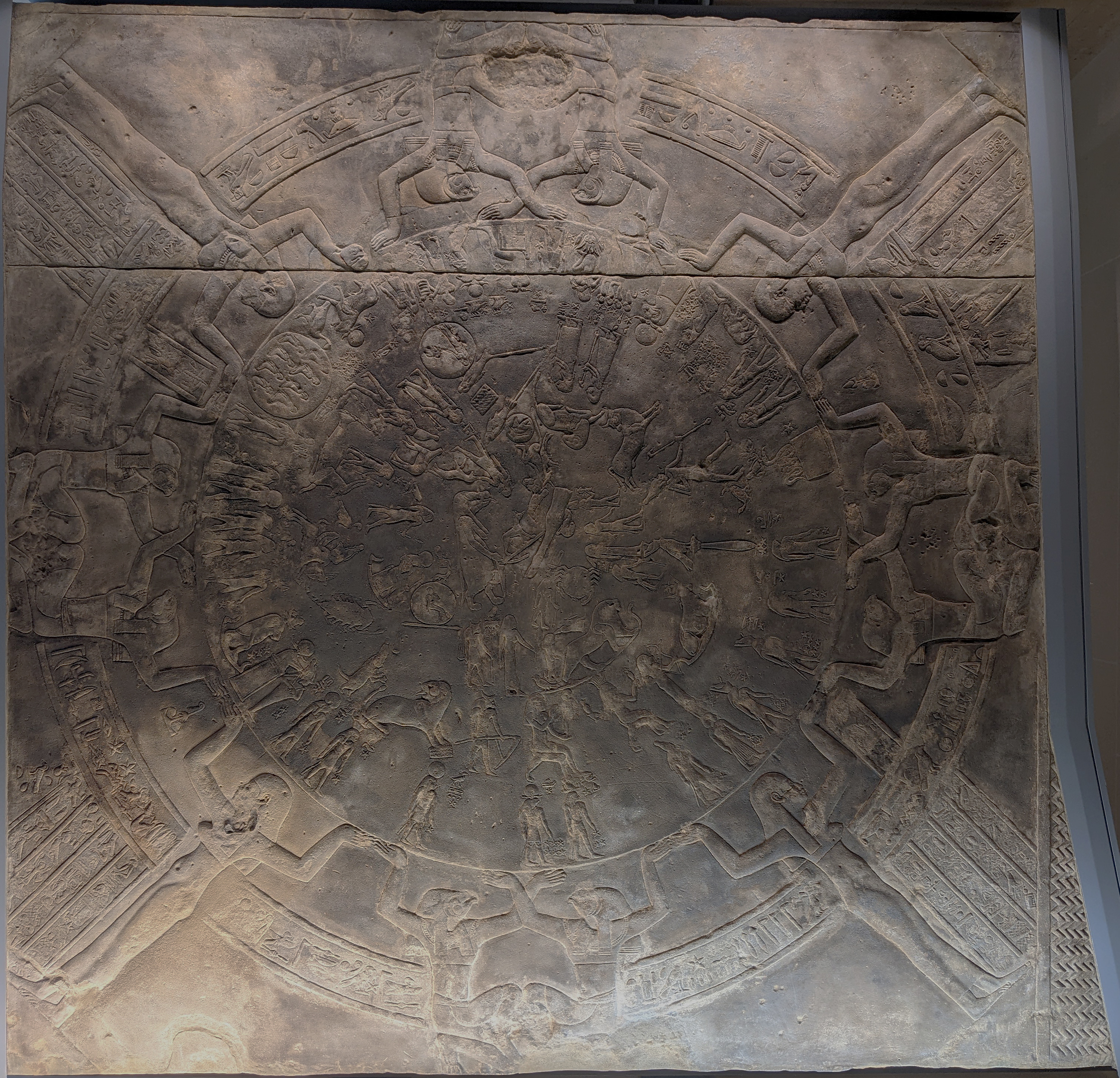
The Dendera zodiac, a late Egyptian celestial map showing constellations and zodiacal imagery.

The sun god (represented by the god Utu in Sumerian texts or Shamash in Akkadian texts) rises in the day and passes over the earth. Then, the sun god falls beneath the earth in the night and comes to a resting point. This resting point is sometimes localized to a designated structure, such as the chamber within a house in the Old Babylonian Prayer to the Gods of the Night. To complete the cycle, the sun comes out in the next morning. Likewise, the moon was thought to rest in the same facility when it was not visible. A similar system was maintained in Egyptian cosmology, where the sun travelled beneath the surface of the earth through the underworld (known among ancient Egyptians as Duat) to rise from the same eastern location each day. These images result from anthropomorphizing the sun and other astral bodies also conceived as gods. To exit beneath the earth, the sun had to cross the solid firmament, which was believed to contain passages (illustrated as doors, windows, or gates) that could temporarily open and close for astral bodies. The firmament was conceived as a gateway, with the entry/exit point as the gates; other opening and closing mechanisms were also imagined in the firmament like bolts, bars, latches, and keys. During the sun's movement beneath the earth, into the netherworld, the sun would cease to flare. This enabled the netherworld to remain dark. But when it rose, it would flare up and again emit light. This model of the course of the sun had an inconsistency that later models evolved to address. The problem was explaining how the sun, if it rested beneath the Earth, could travel the same distance below ground as it appeared to travel above ground during the day, so that it would rise in the east. One solution that some texts arrived at was to reject the idea that the sun had a resting point. Instead, it remained unceasing in its course.

Sumerian and Akkadian texts outline the sun god's nocturnal routine as a fixed sequence: (1) heaven's western door opens; (2) the sun passes through into heaven's interior; (3) light drops below the western horizon; (4) the sun performs netherworld duties such as judging the dead; (5) the sun enters the White House; (6) the sun god dines; (7) the sun god sleeps in the chamber agrun; (8) the sun emerges; (9) the eastern door opens and the sun passes through as it rises. In many ancient near eastern cultures, the underworld had a prominent place in descriptions of the sun journey, where the sun would carry out various roles including judgement related to the dead.

In legend, many hero journeys followed the daily course of the sun god. These have been attributed to Gilgamesh, Odysseus, the Argonauts, Heracles and, in later periods, Alexander the Great. In the Epic of Gilgamesh, Gilgamesh reaches the cosmic mountain Mashu, which is either two mountains or a single twin-peaked mountain. Mashu acts as the sun-gate, from where the sun sets in its path to and out from the netherworld. In some texts, the mountain is called the mountain of sunrise and sunset. According to the Epic:

The name of the mountain was Mashu. When [he] arrived at Mount Mashu, which daily guards the rising [of the sun,] – their tops [abut] the fabric of the heavens, their bases reach down to Hades – there were scorpion-men guarding its gate, whose terror was dread and glance was death, whose radiance was terrifying, enveloping the uplands – at both sunrise and sunset they guard the sun...

Another texts describing the relationship between the sun and the cosmic mountain reads:

O Shamash, when you come forth from the great mountain, When you come forth from the great mountain, the mountain of the deep, When you come forth from the holy hill where destinies are ordained, When you [come forth] from the back of heaven to the junction point of heaven and earth...

A number of additional texts share descriptions like these.

==== Moon ====
Mesopotamians identified the moon with the moon god, called Nanna in Sumerian and Sîn in Akkadian sources. A major deity, he received worship and fathered both the sun god Shamash and the Venus deity Inanna. The path of the moon in the night sky and its lunar phases were also of interest. At first, Mesopotamia had no common calendar, but around 2000 BC, the semi-lunar calendar of the Sumerian center of Nippur became increasingly prevalent. Hence, the moon god was responsible for ordering perceivable time. The lunar calendar was divided into twelve months of thirty days each. New months were marked by the appearance of the moon after a phase of invisibility. The Enuma Elish creation myth describes Marduk as arranging the paths of the stars and then spends considerable space on Marduk's ordering of the moon:

12 He made Nannaru (=the moon-god) appear (and) entrusted the night to him. 13 He assigned him as the jewel of the night to determine the days. 14 Month by month without cease, he marked (him) with a crown: 15 “At the beginning of the month, while rising over the land, 16 you shine with horns to reveal six days. 17 On the seventh day, (your) disc shall be halved. 18 On the fifteenth day, in the middle of each month, you shall stand in opposition. 19 As soon as Šamaš (= the sun-god) sees you on the horizon, 20 reach properly your full measure and form yourself back. 21 At the day of disappearance, approach the path of Šamaš. 22 [... 3]0. day you shall stand in conjunction. You shall be equal to Šamaš.

The ideal course of the moon was thought to form one month every thirty days. However, the precise lunar month is 29.53 days, leading to variations that made the lunar month counted as 29 or 30 days in practice. The mismatch between the predictions and reality of the course of the moon gave rise to the idea that the moon could act according to its expected course as a good omen or deviate from it as a bad omen. In the 2nd millennium BC, Mesopotamian scholars composed the Enūma Anu Enlil, a collection of at least seventy tablets concerned with omens. The first fourteen (1–14) relate to the appearance of the moon, and the next eight (15–22) deal with lunar eclipses.

The moon was also assigned other functions, such as providing illumination during the night, and already in this period, had a known influence on the tides. During the day when the moon was not visible, it was thought that the moon descended beneath the flat disk of the earth and, like the sun, underwent a voyage through the underworld. The cosmic voyage and motion of the moon also allowed it to exert influence over the world; this belief allowed for the practice of divination to arise.

==== Stars and planets ====
Mesopotamian cosmology would differ from the practice of astronomy in terms of terminology: for astronomers, the word "firmament" was not used but instead "sky" to describe the domain in which the heavenly affairs were visible. The stars were located on the firmament. The earliest texts attribute to Anu, Enlil, and Enki (Ea) the ordering of perceivable time by creating and ordering the courses of the stars. Later, according to the Enuma Elish, the stars were arranged by Marduk into constellations representing the images of the gods. The year was fixed by organizing the year into twelve months, and by assigning (the rising of) three stars to each of the twelve months. The moon and zenith were also created. Other phenomena introduced by Marduk included the lunar phases and lunar scheme, the precise paths that the stars would take as they rose and set, the stations of the planets, and more. Another account of the creation of the heavenly bodies appears in the Babyloniaca of Berossus, where Bel (Marduk) creates the stars, sun, moon, and the five known planets. The planets here do not help guide the calendar, a lack of concern also shared by the Book of the Courses of the Heavenly Luminaries, a subsection of 1 Enoch. Concern for the establishment of the calendar by the creation of heavenly bodies as visible signs is shared in at least seven other Mesopotamian texts. A Sumerian inscription of Kudur-Mabuk, for example, reads "The reliable god, who interchanges day and night, who establishes the month, and keeps the year intact." Another example is to be found in the Exaltation of Inanna.

The word "star" (mul in Sumerian; kakkabu in Akkadian) was inclusive to all celestial bodies, stars, constellations, and planets. A more specific term for planets existed however (udu.idim in Sumerian; bibbu in Akkadian, literally "wild sheep") to distinguish them from other stars (of which they were a subcategory): unlike the stars thought to be fixed into their location, the planets were observed to move. By the 3rd millennium BC, the planet Venus was identified as the astral form of the goddess Inanna (or Ishtar), and motifs such as the morning and evening star were applied to her. Jupiter became Marduk (hence the name "Marduk Star", also called Nibiru), Mercury was the "jumping one" (in reference to its comparatively fast motion and low visibility) associated with the gods Ninurta and Nabu, and Mars was the god of pestilence Nergal and thought to portend evil and death. Saturn was also sinister. The most obvious characteristic of the stars were their luminosity and their study for the purposes of divination, solving calendrical calculations, and predictions of the appearances of planets, led to the discovery of their periodic motion. From 600 BC onwards, the relative periodicity between them began to be studied.

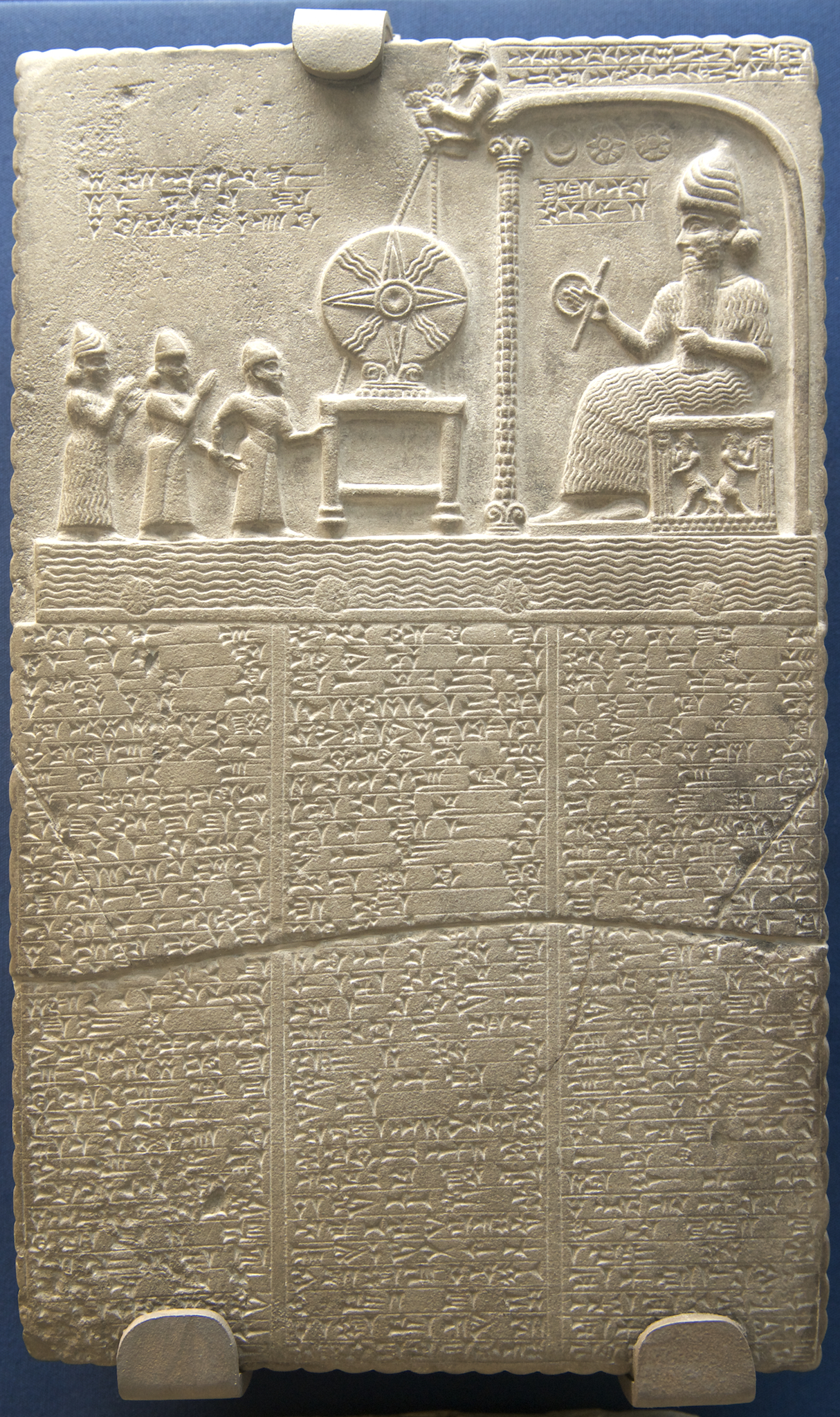
The Tablet of Shamash, otherwise known as the Sun God Tablet. An ancient Babylonian stele depicting the sun god, Shamash, seated on his throne.

=== Upper waters ===
Above the firmament was a large, cosmic body of water which may be referred to as the cosmic ocean or celestial waters. In the Tablet of Shamash, the throne of the sun god Shamash is depicted as resting above the cosmic ocean. The waters are above the solid firmament that covers the sky. (Note: However, according to Hilber: 'The wavy lines are often wrongly interpreted as the "heavenly ocean." However, the Akkadian term apsu is not used for any waters other than the deep ocean, the Abyss of the underworld god, Ea, or things related to these, such as temple water basins. Interpreted correctly, the iconography depicts Shamash emerging from his activity in the underworld waters at sunrise, reinforcing the standard tripartite cosmic divisions in Mesopotamian thought.') In the Enuma Elish, the upper waters represented the waters of Tiamat, contained by Tiamat's stretched out skin. Canaanite mythology in the Baal Cycle describes the supreme god Baal as enthroned above the freshwater ocean. Egyptian texts depict the sun god sailing across these upper waters. Some also convey that this body of water is the heavenly equivalent of the Nile River.

=== Lower waters ===
Both Babylonian and Israelite texts describe one of the divisions of the cosmos as the underworldly ocean. In Babylonian texts, this is coincided with the region/god Abzu. In Sumerian mythology, this realm was created by Enki. It was also where Enki lived and ruled over. Due to the connection with Enki, the lower waters were associated with wisdom and incantational secret knowledge. In Egyptian mythology, the personification of this subterranean body of water was instead Nu. The notion of a cosmic body of water below the Earth was inferred from the realization that much water used for irrigation came from under the ground, from springs, and that springs were not limited to any one part of the world. Therefore, a cosmic body of water acting as a common source for the water coming out of all these springs was conceived.

=== Underworld ===
The Underworld/Netherworld (kur or erṣetu in Sumerian) is the lowest region in the direction downwards, below even Abzu (the primeval ocean/lower waters). It is geographically parallel with the plane of human existence, but was so low that both demons and gods could not descend to it. One of its names was "Earth of No Return". It was, however, inhabited by beings such as ghosts, demons, and local gods. The land was depicted as dark and distant: this is because it was the opposite of the human world and so did not have light, water, fields, and so forth. According to KAR 307, line 37, Bel cast 600 Annunaki into the underworld. They were locked away there, unable to escape, analogous to the enemies of Zeus who were confined to the underworld (Tartarus) after their rebellion during the Titanomachy. During and after the Kassite period, Annunaki were largely depicted as underworld deities; a hymn to Nergal praises him as the "Controller of the underworld, Supervisor of the 600".

In Canaanite religion, the underworld was personified as the god Mot. In Egyptian mythology, the underworld was known as Duat and was ruled by Osiris, the god of the afterlife. It was also the region where the sun (manifested by the god Ra) made its journey from west (where it sets) to the east (from where it would rise again the next morning).

== Creation ==
=== Creation of the cosmos ===
The world was thought to be created ex materia. That is, out of pre-existing, and unformed, eternal matter. This is in contrast to the later notion of creation ex nihilo, which asserts that all the matter of the universe was created out of nothing. The primeval substance had always existed, was unformed, divine, and was envisioned as an immense, cosmic, chaotic mass of water or ocean (a representation that still existed in the time of Ovid). In the Mesopotamian theogonic process, the gods would be ultimately generated from this primeval matter, although a distinct process is found in the Hebrew Bible where God is initially distinct from the primeval matter. For the cosmos and the gods to ultimately emerge from this formless cosmic ocean, the idea emerged that it had to be separated into distinct parts and therefore be formed or organized. This event can be imagined of as the beginning of time. Furthermore, the process of the creation of the cosmos is coincident or equivalent to the beginning of the creation of new gods. In the 3rd millennium BC, the goddess Nammu was the one and singular representation of the original cosmic ocean in Mesopotamian cosmology. From the 2nd millennium BC onwards, this cosmic ocean came to be represented by two gods, Tiamat and Abzu who would be separated from each other to mark the cosmic beginning. The Ugaritic god Yam from the Baal Cycle may also represent the primeval ocean.

Sumerian and Akkadian sources understand the matter of the primordial universe out of which the cosmos emerges in different ways. Sumerian thought distinguished between the inanimate matter that the cosmos was made of and the animate and living matter that permeated the gods and went on to be transmitted to humans. In Akkadian sources, the cosmos is originally alive and animate, but the deaths of Abzu (male deity of the fresh waters) and Tiamat (female sea goddess) give rise to inanimate matter, and all inanimate matter is derived from the dead remains of these deities.

=== Creation of the gods ===
The core Mesopotamian myth to explain the gods' origins begins with the primeval ocean, personified by Nammu, containing Father Sky and Mother Earth within her. In the god-list TCL XV 10, Nammu is called 'the mother, who gave birth to heaven and earth'. The conception of Nammu as mother of Sky-Earth is first attested in the Ur III period (early 2nd millennium BC), though it may go back to an earlier Akkadian era. Earlier in the 3rd millennium BC, the starting point was not Nammu, but just Sky and Earth, with little apparent question about their own origins.

The representation of Sky as male and Earth as female may come from the analogy between the generative power of the male sperm and the rain that comes from the sky, which respectively fertilize the female to give rise to newborn life or the Earth to give rise to vegetation. In the desert-dweller milieu, life depended on pastureland. Sky and Earth are in a union. Because they are the opposite sex, they inevitably reproduce. Every generation of their offspring includes a pair of gods, and altogether, this successive pairs or generations of gods is known as the Enki-Ninki deities. It has been named this way because in every version of the story, the first pair of offspring gods are Enki and Ninki ("Lord and Lady Earth"). The only other consistent feature between all versions of the story is that the last pair is made up of Enlil and Ninlil. In addition, in each pair, one member is male (indicated by the En- prefix) and the other is female (indicated by the Nin- prefix). The birth of Enlil results in the separation of heaven and earth as well as the division of the primordial ocean into the upper and lower waters. Sky, now known as Anu, can mate with other deities after being separated from Earth: he mates with his mother Nammu to give birth to Enki (different from the earlier Enki) who takes dominion over the lower waters. The siblings Enlil and Ninlil mate to give birth to Nanna (also known as Sin), the moon god, and Ninurta, the warrior god. Nanna fathers Utu (known as Shamash in Akkadian texts), the sun god, and Inanna (Venus). By this point, the main features of the cosmos had been created/born.

A variation of this myth existed in Egyptian cosmology. Here, the primordial ocean is given by the god Nu. The creation act neither takes its materials from Nu, unlike in Mesopotamian cosmology, nor is Nu eliminated by the creation act.

=== Separation of heaven and earth ===
The cosmic union, or marriage, of heaven and earth is spoken of in ancient Near Eastern texts stretching back to the 3rd millennium BC. The first source that mentions their separation is from the late 3rd millennium BC, known as the Song of the hoe. During the 2nd millennium BC, these texts shift in their focus from the union to the separation of heaven and earth, as shown by Sumerian, Akkadian, Phoenician, Egyptian, and Greek mythologies.

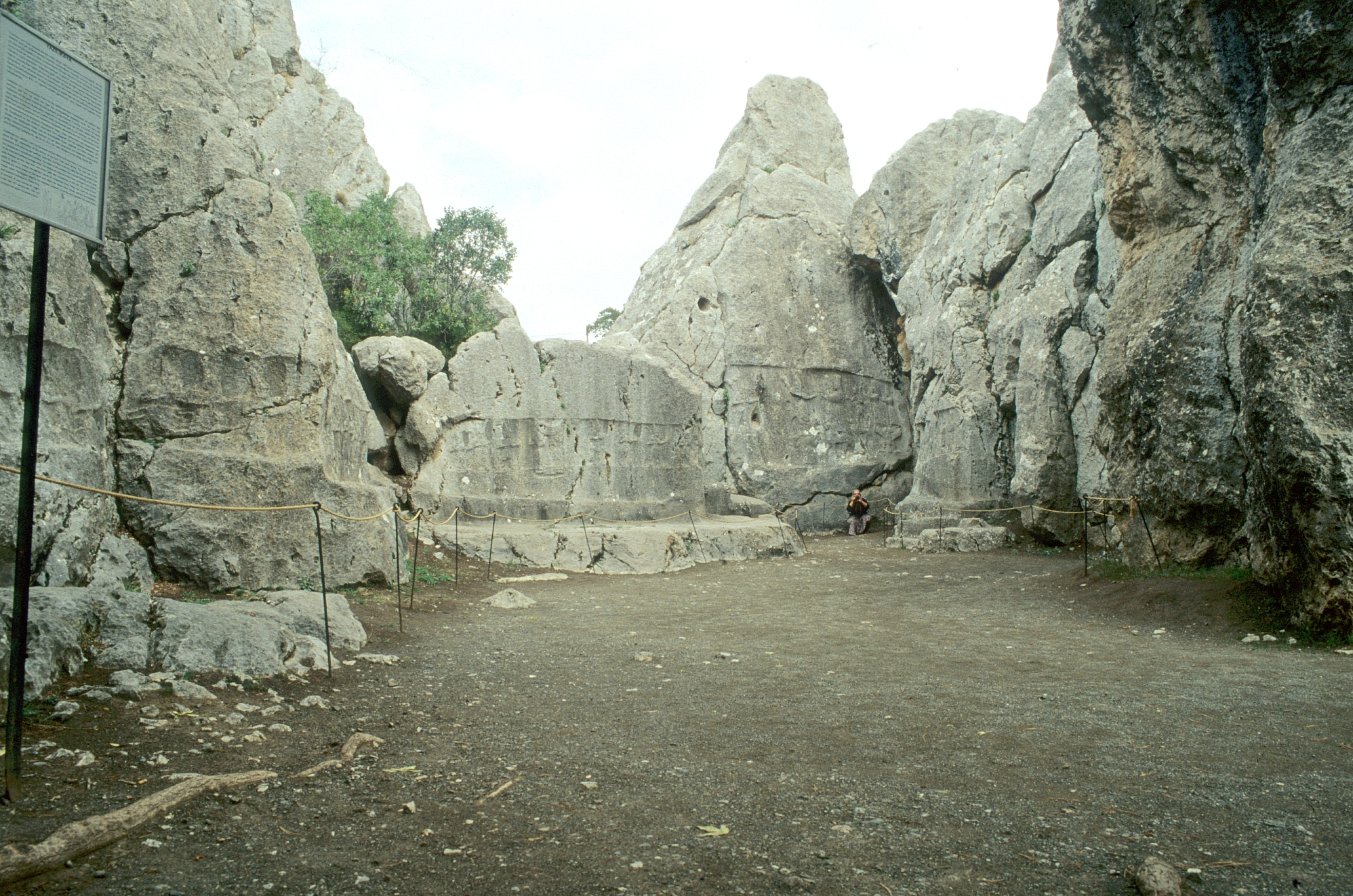
Chamber A at Yazılıkaya, a Hittite rock sanctuary whose divine processions have been interpreted in relation to Hittite cosmic and calendrical symbolism.

The cause of the separation involves either the agency of Enlil or takes place as a spontaneous act. One recovered Hittite text states that there was a time when they "severed the heaven from the earth with a cleaver", and an Egyptian text refers to "when the sky was separated from the earth" (Pyramid Text 1208c). OIP 99 113 ii and 136 iii says Enlil separated Earth from Sky and separated Sky from Earth. Enkig and Ninmah 1–2 also says Sky and Earth were separated in the beginning. The introduction of Gilgamesh, Enkidu, and the Netherworld says that heaven is carried off from the earth by the sky god Anu to become the possession of the wind god Enlil. Several other sources also present this idea.

In the Akkadian Enuma Elish, written in the early 1st millennium BC, the god Marduk divides the corpse of the slain primordial goddess Tiamat into two parts, one stretched out to create heaven, the other to create the earth. As begins in lines 135–138:

135 The Lord [Marduk] rested, examining her [Tiamat's] dead body, 136. To divide the abortion (and) to create ingenious things (therewith). 137. He split her open like a mussel (?) into two (parts); 138. Half of her he set in place and formed the sky (therewith) as a roof....

The nature of the original mass is described in several ways. In older, Sumerian texts from the 3rd to early 2nd millennia BC, the original mass was a solid. In the younger Akkadian tradition, such as the Enuma Elish, the original mass was a water. In the Sumerian sources, heaven and earth are separated over the course of "long days and nights" (similar to the six-day timeline in the Genesis creation narrative), by two gods: Anu, the King of Heaven, and Enlil, the King of Earth.

=== Stretching out the heavens ===
The idiom of the heavens and earth being stretched out plays both a cultic and cosmic role in the Hebrew Bible where it appears repeatedly in the Book of Isaiah (40:22; 42:5; 44:24; 45:12; 48:13; 51:13, 16), with related expressions in the Book of Job (26:7) the Psalms (104:2), Jeremiah (10:12) and in Zechariah (12:1). One example reads "The one who stretched out the heavens like a curtain / And who spread them out like a tent to dwell in" (Is 40:22). The idiom is used in these texts to identify the creative element of Yahweh's activities and the expansion of the heavens signifies its vastness, acting as Yahweh's celestial shrine. In Psalmic tradition, the "stretching" of the heavens is analogous to the stretching out of a tent. The Hebrew verb for the "stretching" of the heavens is also the regular verb for "pitching" a tent. The heavens, in other words, may be depicted as a cosmic tent (a motif found in many ancient cultures). This finds architectural analogy in descriptions of the tabernacle, which is itself a heavenly archetype, over which a tent is supposed to have been spread. The phrase is frequently followed by an expression that God sits enthroned above and ruling the world, paralleling descriptions of God being seated in the Holy of Holies of the Tabernacle where he is stated to exercise rule over Israel. Biblical references to stretching the heavens typically occur in conjunction with statements that God made or laid the foundations of the earth.

Similar expressions may be found elsewhere in the ancient world. A text from the 2nd millennium BC, the Ludlul Bēl Nēmeqi, says "Wherever the earth is laid, and the heavens are stretched out", though the text does not identify the creator of the cosmos. The Enuma Elish also describes the phenomena, in IV.137–140:

137 He split her into two like a dried fish: 138 One half of her he set up and stretched out as the heavens. 139 He stretched the skin and appointed a watch. 140 With the instruction not to let her waters escape.

In this text, Marduk takes the body of Tiamat, who he has killed, and stretches out Tiamat's skin to create the firmamental heavens which, in turn, comes to play the role of preventing the cosmic waters above the firmament from escaping and being unleashed onto the earth. Whereas the Masoretic Text of the Hebrew Bible states that Yahweh stretched heaven like a curtain in Psalm 104:2, the equivalent passage in the Septuagint instead uses the analogy of stretching out like "skin", which could represent a relic of Babylonian cosmology from the Enuma Elish. Nevertheless, the Hebrew Bible never identifies the material out of which the firmament was stretched. Numerous theories about what the firmament was made of sprung up across ancient cultures.

=== Creation of humanity ===
Many stories emerged to explain the creation of humanity and the birth of civilization. Earlier Sumerian language texts from the 3rd and 2nd millennia BC can be divided into two traditions depending on if they come from the city of Nippur or the city of Eridu. The Nippur tradition asserts that Heaven (An) and Earth (Ki) were coupled in a cosmic marriage. After they are separated by Enlil, Ki receives semen from An and gives rise to the gods, animals, and man. The Eridu tradition says that Enki, the offspring of An and Namma (in this tradition, the freshwater goddess) is the one who creates everything. Periodical relations between Enki and Ninhursaga (in this tradition, the personification of Earth) gives rise to vegetation. With the help of Namma, Enki creates man from clay. A famous work of the Eridu tradition is Eridu Genesis. A minority tradition in Sumerian texts, distinct from Nippur and Eridu traditions, is known from KAR 4, where the blood of a slaughtered deity is used to create humanity for the purpose of making them build temples for the gods.

Later Akkadian language tradition can be divided into various minor cosmogonies, cosmogonies of significant texts like Enuma Elish and Epic of Atrahasis, and finally the Dynasty of Dunnum placed in its own category. In the Atrahasis Epic, the Anunnaki gods force the Igigi gods to do their labor. However, the Igigi became fed up with this work and rebel. To solve the problem, Enlil and Mami create humanity by mixing the blood of gods with clay, who in the stead of the Igigi are assigned the gods' work. In the Enuma Elish, divine blood alone is used to make man.

== Main texts ==
=== Overview and limitations ===
The Hebrew Bible, especially in the Genesis creation narrative, undergirds known beliefs about biblical cosmology in ancient Israel and Judah. From Mesopotamia, cosmological evidence has fragmentarily survived in cuneiform literature especially in the Sumerian and Akkadian languages, like the Enuma Elish. Cosmogonic information has been sourced from Enki-Ninki god lists. Cosmogonic prologues preface texts falling in the genre of the Sumerian and Akkadian disputation poems, as well as individual works like the Song of the hoe, Gilgamesh, Enkidu, and the Netherworld, and Lugalbanda I. Evidence is also available in Ugaritic (Ritual Theogony of the Gracious Gods) and Hittite (Song of Emergence) sources. Egyptian papyri and inscriptions, like the Memphite Theology, and later works such as the Babyloniaca of Berossus, offer additional evidence. A less abundant source are pictorial/iconographic representations, especially the Babylonian Map of the World.

Limitations of these types of texts (papyri, cuneiform, etc.) is that the majority are administrative and economic in their nature, saying little about cosmology. Detailed descriptions are unknown before the first millennium BC. As such, reconstructions from that time depend on gleaning information from surviving creation myths and etiologies.

=== Enuma Elish ===
The Enuma Elish is the most famous Mesopotamian creation story and was widely known in among learned circles across Mesopotamia, influencing both art and ritual. It is also the only complete cosmogony, whereas others must be reconstructed from disparate sources. The narrative is largely original and does not reflect broader ancient Near Eastern or Babylonian cosmology. It remains the most complete creation account, likely because it was embedded in a preserved corpus of Babylonian literature. On the other hand, recent evidence suggests that after its composition, it played an important role in Babylonian scribal education. The story is preserved foremost in seven clay tablets discovered from the Library of Ashurbanipal in Nineveh. The creation myth seeks to describes how the god Marduk created the world from the body of the sea monster Tiamat after defeating her in battle, after which Marduk ascends to the top of the heavenly pantheon. The Enuma Elish is one of a broader set of Near Eastern traditions describing the cosmic battle between the storm and sea gods, but only Israelite cosmogonies share with it the act of creation that follows the storm gods victory.

The following is a synopsis of the account. The primordial universe is alive and animate, made of Abzu, commonly identified as a male deity of the fresh waters, and Tiamat, the female sea goddess of salt waters. (Note: The idea of a salt-fresh water duality between Apsu and Tiamat is based on, for the former, texts where the term apsu refers to springs and canal waters, and for the latter, the derivation of Tiamat's name from the noun tâmtu meaning "sea" (seas typically being salty). However, this interpretation leads to a number of conceptual difficulties when interpreting the Enuma Elish and many have rejected the presence of a salt-fresh water duality altogether in the text (which is never explicitly articulated) in favor of the view that Apsu and Tiamat simply represent two undifferentiated primordial waters. Fresh and saltwater dualities are, however, also proposed for the Baal Cycle, such as the characterization of Yam as the god of salt sea with his daughters Pidray (god of rain), Tallay (dew) and Arsay (springs, ground-water) as the gods of freshwater. Similarly, in early Greek cosmology, Oceanus was the saltwater god and his wife Tethys was the freshwater god.) The waters mingle to create the next generations of deities. However, the younger gods are noisy and this noise eventually incenses Abzu so much that he tries to kill them. In trying to do so, however, he is killed by Ea (Akkadian equivalent of the Sumerian Enki). This eventually leads to a battle between Tiamat and the son of Ea, Marduk. Marduk kills Tiamat and fashions the cosmos, including the heavens and Earth, from Tiamat's corpse. Tiamat's breasts are used to make the mountains and Tiamat's eyes are used to open the sources of the Tigris and Euphrates rivers. Parts of the watery body were used to create parts of the world including its wind, rain, mist, and rivers. Marduk forms the heavenly bodies including the sun, moon, and stars to produce periodic astral activity that is the basis for the calendar, before finally setting up the cosmic capital at Babylon. Marduk attains universal kingship and the Tablet of Destinies. Tiamat's helper Kingu is also slain and his life force is used to animate the first human beings.

The Enuma Elish is in continuity with other texts like the Myth of Anzû, the Labbu Myth, and KAR 6. In both the Enuma Elish and the Myth of Anzu, a dragon (Anzu or Tiamat) steals the Tablet of Destinies from Enlil, the chief god and in response, the chief god looks for someone to slay the dragon. Then, in both stories, a champion among the gods is chosen to fight the dragon (Ninurta or Marduk) after two or three others before them reject the offer to fight. The champion wins, after which he is acclaimed and given many names. The Enuma Elish may have also drawn from the myth of the Ninurta and the dragon Kur. The dragon is formerly responsible for holding up the primordial waters. Upon being killed, the waters begin to rise; this problem is solved by Ninurta heaping stones upon them until the waters are held back. One of the most significant differences between the Enuma Elish and earlier creation myths is in its exaltation of Marduk as the highest god. In prior myths, Ea was the chief god and creator of mankind.

=== Genesis creation narrative ===
The Genesis creation narrative, composed perhaps in the 7th or 6th century BC, spans Gen 1:1–2:3 and covers a one-week (seven-day) period. In each of the first three days there is an act of division: day one divides the darkness from light, day two the "waters above" from the "waters below", and day three the sea from the land. In each of the next three days these divisions are populated: day four populates the darkness and light with "greater light" (Sun), "lesser light" (Moon) and stars; day five populates seas and skies with fish and fowl; and finally land-based creatures and mankind populate the land. According to Victor Hamilton, most scholars agree that the choice of "greater light" and "lesser light", rather than the more explicit "Sun" and "Moon", is anti-mythological rhetoric intended to contradict widespread contemporary beliefs that the Sun and the Moon were deities themselves.

In 1895, Hermann Gunkel related this narrative to the Enuma Elish via an etymological relationship between Tiamat and təhôm ("the deep" or "the abyss") and a sharing of the Chaoskampf motif. Today, another view rejects these connections and groups the Genesis creation narrative with other West Semitic cosmologies like those of Ugarit.

=== Other biblical creation narratives ===
Other prominent biblical cosmogonies include Psalm 74:12–17; Psalm 89:6–13; and Job 26:7–13, with a variety of additional briefer passages expounding on subsections of these lengthier passages (like Isaiah 51:9–10). These cosmogonies, like those from Babylon, Egypt, Anatolia, and Canaan and the Levant, depict a cosmic battle between a deity (Yahweh in the biblical accounts) and a sea god, Leviathan or Rahab; however, only Babylonian versions such as the Enuma Elish follow the sea god's defeat with an act of creation. In this familiar cosmogony, Yahweh battles and overcomes the sea god, depicted as armed and commanding weather; the primordial sea retreats to reveal dry land, with portions confined to the shoreline, clouds, and subterranean storehouses; Mount Zaphon is founded and Yahweh's temple built; ultimately, Yahweh takes his throne above the other gods.

An alternative cosmogony appears in the doxologies of Amos (4:13; 5:8; 9:5–6). Instead of the earth being already covered by a primal sea, the earth is originally in a dry state and only later is the sea stretched over it. No cosmic battle takes place. The winds and mountains, which elsewhere primordially exist, in this account are both created. Like some passages in Deutero-Isaiah, these doxologies appear to present a view of creation ex-nihilo.

These cosmogonies are relatively mythologized compared to the Genesis cosmogony. In addition, the Genesis cosmogony differs by describing the separation of the upper and lower waters by the creation of a firmament, whereas here, they are typically assembled into clouds. The closest cosmogony to Genesis is the one in Psalm 104.

=== Babyloniaca of Berossus ===
The first book of the Babyloniaca of the Babylonian priest Berossus, composed in the third century BC, offers a variant (or, perhaps, an interpretation) of the cosmogony of the Enuma Elish. This work is not extant but survives in later quotations and abridgements. Berossus' account begins with a primeval ocean. Unlike in the Enuma Elish, where sea monsters are generated for combat with other gods, in Berossus' account, they emerge by spontaneous generation and are described in a different manner to the 11 monsters of the Enuma Elish, as it expands beyond the purely mythical creatures of that account in a potential case of influence from Greek zoology. The fragments of Berossus by Syncellus and the Armenian of how he described his cosmogony are as follows:

Syncellus: There was a time, he says, when everything was [darkness and] water and that in it fabulous beings with peculiar forms came to life. For men with two wings were born and some with four wings and two faces, having one body and two heads, male and female, and double genitalia, male and female ... [a list of monstrous beings follows]. Over all these a woman ruled named Omorka. This means in Chaldaean Thalatth, in Greek it is translated as ‘Sea’ (Thalassa) ... When everything was arranged in this way, Belos rose up and split the woman in two. Of one half of her he made earth, of the other half sky; and he destroyed all creatures in her ... For when everything was moist, and creatures had come into being in it, this god took off his own head and the other gods mixed the blood that flowed out with earth and formed men. For this reason they are intelligent and share in divine wisdom. Belos, whom they translate as Zeus, cut the darkness in half and separated earth and sky from each other and ordered the universe. The creatures could not endure the power of the light and were destroyed. When Belos saw the land empty and barren, he ordered one of the gods to cut off his own head and to mix the blood that flowed out with earth and to form men and wild animals that were capable of enduring the air. Belos also completed the stars and the sun and the moon and the five planets. Alexander Polyhistor says that Berossus asserts these things in his first book.

Syncellus: They say that in the beginning all was water, which was called Sea (Thalassa). Bel made this one by assigning a place to each, and he surrounded Babylon with a wall.

Armenian: All, he said, was from the start water, which was called Sea. And Bel placed limits on them (the waters) and assigned a place to each, allocated their lands, and fortified Babylon with an enclosing wall.

The conclusion of the account states that Belus then created the stars, sun, moon, and five planets. The account of Berossus agrees largely with the Enuma Elish, such as its reference to the splitting of the woman whose halves are used to create heaven and earth, but also contain a number of differences, such as the statement about allegorical exegesis, the self-decapitation of Belus in order to create humans, and the statement that it is the divine blood which has made humans intelligent. Some debate has ensued about which elements of these may or may not go back to the original account of Berossus. Some of the information Berossus got for his account of the creation myth may have come from the Enuma Elish and the Babylonian Dynastic Chronicle.

=== Other ===
Additional minor texts also present varying cosmogonical details. The Bilingual Creation of the World by Marduk describes the construction of Earth as a raft over the cosmic waters by Marduk. An Akkadian text called The Worm describes a series of creation events: first Heaven creates Earth, Earth creates the Rivers, and eventually, the worm is created at the end of the series and it goes to live in the root of the tooth that is removed during surgery.

== Influence ==
=== Survival ===
Copies from the Sippar Library indicate the Enuma Elish was copied into Seleucid times. One Hellenistic-era Babylonian priest, Berossus, wrote a Greek text about Mesopotamian traditions called the Babyloniaca (History of Babylon). The text survives mainly in fragments, especially by quotations in Eusebius in the fourth-century. The first book contains an account of Babylonian cosmology and, though concise, contains a number of echoes of the Enuma Elish. The creation account of Berossus is attributed to the divine messenger Oannes in the period after the global flood and is derivative of the Enuma Elish but also has significant variants to it. Babylonian cosmology also received treatments by the lost works of Alexander Polyhistor and Abydenus. The last known evidence for reception of the Enuma Elish is in the writings of Damascius (462–538), who had a well-informed source. As such, some learned circles in late antiquity continued to know the Enuma Elish. Echoes of Mesopotamian cosmology continue into the 11th century.

=== Early Greek cosmology ===
Early Greek cosmology was closely related to the broader domain of ancient near eastern cosmology, reflected 8th century BC works like the Theogony of Hesiod and the works of Homer, and prior to the emergence of an independent and systematic Hellenistic system of cosmology that was represented by figures such as Aristotle and the astronomer Ptolemy, starting with the Ionian School of philosophy at the city of Miletus from the 6th to 4th centuries BC. In early Greek cosmology, the Earth was conceived of as being flat, encircled by a cosmic ocean known as Oceanus, and that heaven was a solid firmament held above the Earth by pillars. Many believe that a Hurro-Hittite work from the 13th century BC, the Song of Emergence (CTH 344), was directly used by Hesiod on the basis of extensive similarities between their accounts.

The notion of heaven and earth originally being in unity followed by their separation continues to be attested in later Greek cosmological texts, such as in the descriptions of Orphic cosmology according to the Wise Melanippe of Euripides in the 5th century BC and the Argonautica by Apollonius of Rhodes in the 3rd century BC, as well as in other and still later Greek accounts, such as the writings of Diodorus Siculus in the 1st century BC.

=== Zoroastrian cosmology ===
The earliest Zoroastrian sources describe a tripartite sky, with an upper heaven where the sun exists, a middle heaven where the moon exists, and a lower heaven where the stars exist and are fixed. Significant work has been done on comparing this cosmography to ones present in Mesopotamian, Greek, and Indian parallels. In light of evidence which has emerged in recent decades, the present view is that this idea entered into Zoroastrian thought through Mesopotamian channels of influence. Another influence is that the name that one of the planets took on in Middle Persian literature, Kēwān (for Saturn), was derived from the Akkadian language.

=== Jewish cosmology ===
Mesopotamian cosmology, especially as it manifested in the biblical Genesis creation narrative, exerted continued substantial influence on Jewish cosmology, especially as it is described in the rabbinic literature. Not all influence appears to have been mediated through the Bible. The dome-shaped firmament was described in Hebrew as a kippah, which has been related to its Akkadian cognate kippatšamê, though the latter only refers to flat objects. The Jewish belief in seven heavens, as it is absent from the Hebrew Bible, has often been interpreted as being taken from early interactions with Mesopotamian cosmologies.

=== Christian cosmology ===
Christian texts were familiar with ancient near eastern cosmology insofar as it had shaped the Genesis creation narrative. A genre of literature emerged among Jews and Christians dedicated to the composition of texts commenting precisely on this narrative to understand the cosmos and its origins: these works are called Hexaemeron. The first extant example is the De opificio mundi ("On the Creation of the World") by the first-century Jewish philosopher Philo of Alexandria. Philo preferred an allegorical form of exegesis, in line with that of the School of Alexandria, and so was partial to a Hellenistic cosmology as opposed to an ancient near eastern one. In the late fourth century, the Hexaemeral genre was revived and popularized by the Hexaemeron of Basil of Caesarea, who composed his Hexaemeron in 378, which subsequently inspired numerous works including among Basil's own contemporaries. Basil was much more literal in his interpretation than Philo, closer instead to the exegesis of the School of Antioch. Christian authors would heavily dispute the correct degree of literal or allegorical exegesis in future writings. Among Syrian authors, Jacob of Serugh was the first to produce his own Hexaemeron in the early sixth century, and he was followed later by Jacob of Edessa's Hexaemeron in the first years of the eighth century. Cosmas Indicopleustes's Christian Topography took the most literal approach, presenting a cosmography closely resembling the traditional Mesopotamian model. John Philoponus sharply rebutted Cosmas in his De opificio mundi. Syrian Christian texts also shared topographical features like the cosmic ocean surrounding the earth.

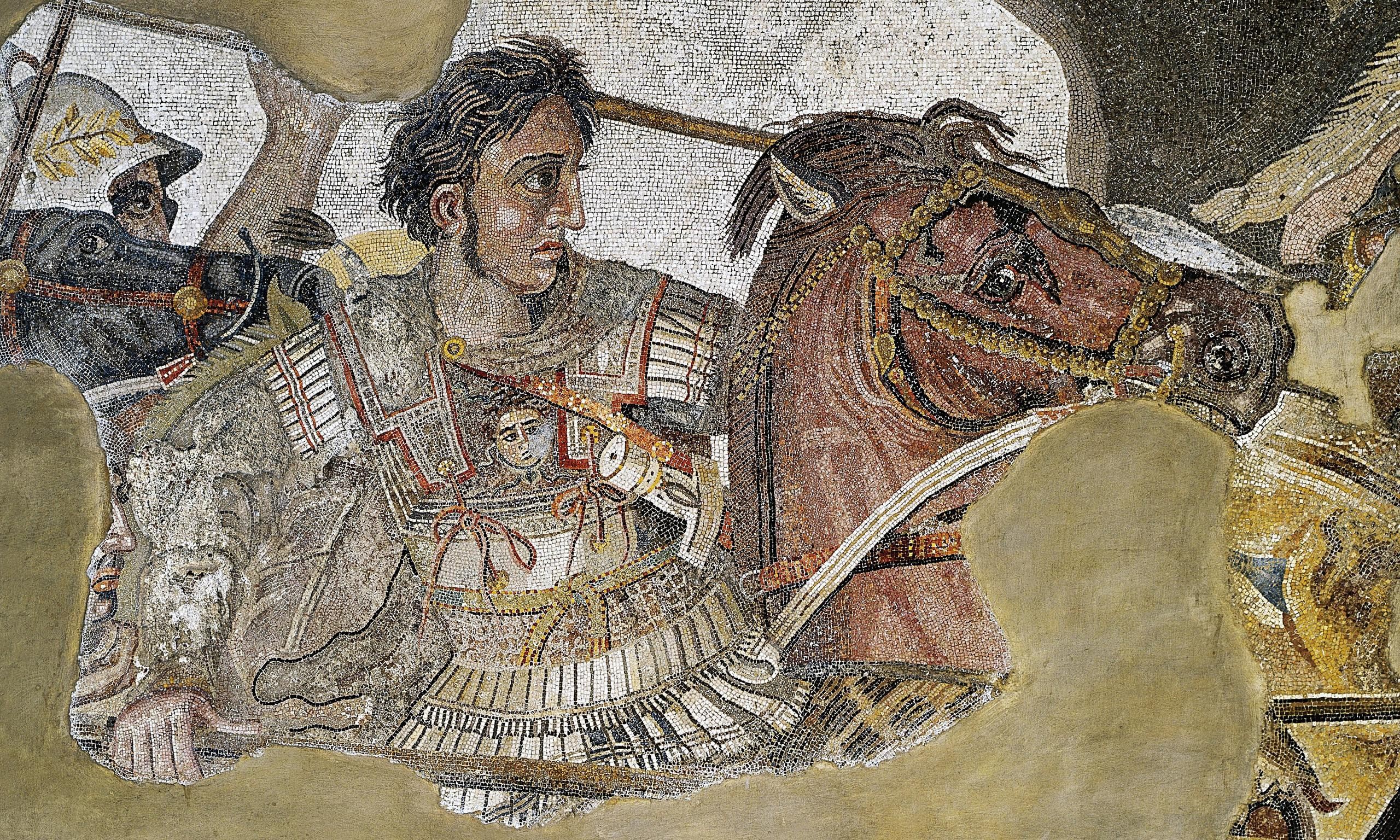
Mosaic of Alexander the Great from Pompei

Cosmographies were described in works other than those of the Hexaemeral genre. For example, in the genre of novels, the Alexander Romance would portray a mythologized picture of the journeys and conquests of Alexander the Great, ultimately inspired by the Epic of Gilgamesh. The influence is evident in the texts cosmography, as Alexander reaches an outer ocean circumscribing the Earth which cannot be passed. Both in the Alexander Romance, and in later texts like the Syriac Alexander Legend (Neshana), Alexander journeys to the ends of the Earth which is surrounded by an ocean. Unlike in the story of Gilgamesh, however, this ocean is an unpassable boundary that marks the extent to which Alexander can go. The Neshana likewise reflects Mesopotamian cosmography in its account of the sun's course: the sun enters a firmamental gateway at sunset in the west, traverses the earth's opposite side, and emerges at dawn in the east through another celestial gate. Alexander, like Gilgamesh, follows the path of the sun during his journey. These elements of Alexander's journey are also described as part of the journey of Dhu al-Qarnayn in the Quran. Gilgamesh's journey takes him to a great cosmic mountain Mashu; likewise, Alexander reaches a cosmic mountain known as Musas. The cosmography depicted in this text greatly resembles that outlined by the Babylonian Map of the World.

=== Quranic cosmology ===
The Quran conceives of the primary elements of the ancient near eastern cosmography, such as the division of the cosmos into the heavens and the Earth, a solid firmament, upper waters, a flat Earth, and seven heavens. As with rabbinic cosmology, however, these elements were not directly transmitted from ancient near eastern civilization. Instead, work in the field of Quranic studies has identified the primary historical context for the reception of these ideas to have been in the Christian and Jewish cosmologies of late antiquity. This conception of the cosmos was carried on into the traditionalist cosmologies that were held in the caliphate, though with a few nuances that appear to have emerged.

== See also ==
- Ancient Mesopotamian religion
- Creation of life from clay
- Hexaemeron
- Pre-Islamic Arabian inscriptions
- King of the Universe
- Mandaean cosmology
- Panbabylonism
- Quranic studies
