= List of Mandaean priests =

This article contains a list of historical and active Mandaean priests, all of whom have the ranks of Rishama, Ganzibra or Tarmida.

Mandaean priestly families include the Manduia (Manduwi), Kupašia (Khaffagi), Kuhailia (Choheili), and Durakia (Dorragi) families, all of which can be traced back to the mid-1400s.

== List of Mandaean priests ==
=== Active ===
As of 2023, Australia has the largest number of active Mandaean priests, all of whom reside in the Western Sydney region. Most of the following list of currently active Mandaean priests is based on Buckley (2023) and from The Worlds of Mandaean Priests website curated by Christine Robins, Yuhana Nashmi et al. Note that this is a partial, incomplete list.

- Rishamma Sattar Jabbar Hilow, Iraq
- Rishamma Salah Choheili, Australia
- Rishamma Professor Brikha Nasoraia, Australia
- Ganzibra Najah Choheili, Iran
- Ganzibra Khaldoon Majid Abdullah, Australia
- Ganzibra Waleed Khashan, Australia (also known as Walid Abdul Razzak or Walid Ebadfardzadeh)
- Ganzibra Salwan Alkhamas (or Salwan Shakir Khamas), Sweden
- Ganzibra Salam Ghaiad, Sweden
- Ganzibra Taleb Dorragi, Iran
- Ganzibra Fawzi Masboob, United States
- Tarmida Bassam Fadhil al-Haider, United States
- Tarmida Asaad Muttar al-Othmani, Australia
- Tarmida Thamir Shamkhi, Australia
- Tarmida Sahi Bashikh, Australia
- Tarmida Peyam Jizan, Australia
- Tarmida Saleem al-Zuhairi, Australia
- Tarmida Yuhana Nashmi, Australia
- Tarmida Qais Edan (Qais Aidan), Sweden
- Tarmida Rafid Al-Sabti, Netherlands
- Tarmida Behram Khafajy (Bihram Khaffagi), Iran
- Tarmida Sam Zahrooni, Iran

=== Historical ===
This list of historical Mandaean priests, along with the accompanying notes, is primarily adapted from Buckley (2010). The majority of the names are from colophons (tarik ࡕࡀࡓࡉࡊ) in Mandaean texts that provide detailed information about the scribes who had transcribed them. Note that written Mandaic br means "son of," while written Mandaic pt means "daughter."

Priest	Other names	Notes	Years
Sh. Abdullah Khaffagi of Ahwaz	Sam Yuhana br Bihram		d. 1975
Sh. Abdullah br Sh. Negm		rishama; emigrated to the United Kingdom	d. 2009
Adam br Mhatam Yuhana, Manduia	Sh. ‛Idan		
Adam br Ram Gadana			
Adam br Yahia Papia			
Adam br Sarwan Ruzbia/Ruzba			
Adam br Sam, Ram Ziwa			fl. 1658
Adam Abu‛l Faraš br Bihram Šitil		"head of the people"	
Adam Bahran/Bihram br Zakia Mašhadia		older brother of Yahia Sam br Hibil Zihrun	
Adam Bayan br Šadan Zarzuia		brother of Sarwan Bulbul br Adam Bayan	fl. early 1400s
Adam Yuhana br Yahia Anuš, Šu‛ilia, Busa‛id			
Adam Yuhana br Sam, Kamisia, Riš Draz		father of Yahia Bihram	fl. 1788–early 1800s
Adam Paraš br Zihrun, ‛Ubadia and Baṭahaiia			fl. 1615
Adam (Sabur) br Ninia			
Adam Zakia br BrHiia			
Adam Zihrun br Bihram Šitlan			fl. 1529–1564
Adam Zihrun br Sam, Manduia	Sh. Abdullah	ganzibra in Baghdad; initiator of Jabbar Choheili in 1948; father of Abdul Jabbar Abdullah	d. 1981
Adam Zihrun br Yahia Yuhana Bihdad			
Adam Zihrun br Yahia Bihram, Manduia			
Adam Zihrun br Mhatam, Ram Ziwa			fl. 1690
Adam Zihrun br Zakia Šitil, Quṭana		yalufa	fl. 1629
Anhar pt Sam Bihram			
Anhar Kumraita		ganzibra; in Qulasta prayer 170	
Anuš br Naṭar			
Anuš br Buran		in Qulasta prayer 170	
Anuš Bihdad br Yahia (Sam) Adam			
Anuš br Danqa			fl. 638
Anuš Ma‛ilia/Mu’ilia br Anuš Bihdad (the elder)			
Anuš Ma‛ilia br Bihdad Zakia (the younger)			
Anuš Šaiar br Nṣab			
Badriiah pt Šuraš		book owner	
Bayan br Yahia Diqnana			
Bayan Hibil br Brik Yawar			fl. mid-700s
Bayan Hibil ‛Qaiam br Zindana			
Bainai br Zakia and Haiuna			
Baktiar br Adam Mhatam, Kuhailia			
Baktiar Bulbul br Ram Ziwa, Ram Ziwa clan			fl. 1632
Baktiar Tilidia (and his unnamed mother)			
Banan/Bahram br Brik Yawar	Bayan		
Bhira br Šitil			
Bibia Mudalal pt Adam Yuhana, Sa‛dan, Kamisia		survivor of 1831 cholera; wife of Ram Zihrun br Sam Bihram, Kupašia; sister of Yahia Bihram br Adam Yuhana	fl. 1831
Bihdad br Zihrun		ethnarch; grandson of ‛Qaiam br Zindana	
(Yahia) Bihram br Adam Zarzuia			
Bihram br Ram Zihrun			fl. 1831
(Bihram) Bayan br Adam Šupartaiia			
Bihram Bayan br Yahia Baz			
Bihram BrHiia br Adam Zakia, Kuhailia (the elder)		one of the earliest known ancestors of the Kuhailia clan, including Brikha Nasoraia	fl. 1400s
Bihram BrHiia br (Adam) Baktiar, Kuhailia (the younger)		nephew of Bihram BrHiia, above	
Bihram Sam br Yahia Yuhana, Dihdaria	Sam Bihram	a ganzibra, exiled in 1818, Qurna	fl. 1818
Bihram Šitil br Yahia Yuhana, Sumaqa			
Bihram Zakia br Bayan Šupartaiia			
BrHiia br Yuhana			
Brik Yawar br Bihdad			c. 560–600
Brik Manda (Šitil) br Sku/Ska Hiia			
Dihdar ‛Id br Adam Bihram			
Dihdar Mhatam Bulbul br Sam Bihram, ‛Asikir			
Dihdar Zihrun br Sam Sakara/‛Asikir		"head of the people"	
‛Qaiam br Zindana			
‛Uda br Yuhana			
Sh. Farraj br Sh. Sam	Adam br Sam		fl. 1900s
Faruk br Marspindu Abuzdaqad			
Haiašum br Sku Hiia			
Sh. Haithem	Sam br Sam Yuhana Haiuna pt Tihwia and Yahia	ethnarch; in Qulasta prayer 170	
Harmuzdukt/Hurmuzdukt			
Hawa pt Daiia		ganzibra; in Qulasta prayer 170	
Hawa pt Nukraya			c. 750–800
Hawa pt Yahia/Yuhana		editor	c. 1300
Hawa Mahnuš pt Yahia			fl. mid-1400s
(Hida) Hawa Simat pt Adam			c. 1700
Hibil BrHiia br Sam Nangara		from Gazania	
Sh. Jabbar Tawoosie	Mhatam Yuhana br Tawoos	from Ahwaz	
Sh. Kumait			fl. 1900s
Kiria pt Salim, Quṭana			
Mamania pt Hibil			
Mamul Dihgan pt ‛sta Bihram			
Mariuaria pt Adam Šapur			
Marspindu Abuzdaqad			
Mhatam br Yahia Bihram, Kamisia, Riš Draz			fl. 1910
Mhatam br Yahia Bayan, Dihdaria			
Mhatam Bayan br Dihdar Zihrun, Ša‛puria		"father of kings"	
Mhatam Yuhana br Yahia Sam, Manduia	Sh. Damouk	great-grandfather of Lamia Abbas Amara	
Mhatam Yuhana br Adam Yuhana, Sabur	Sh. Šukar br Sh. Fulad		fl. 1849
Mhatam Zihrun br Baktiar/Yahia BrHiia, Kuhailia		husband of Yasmin Mudalal; uncle of Bihram BrHiia the elder	
Mhatam Zihrun br Bahran/Bihram Mušarah			
Mhatam Zihrun br Adam, Manduia	Sh. Dakhil/Dukhayl		d. 1964
Miriai pt Simat			
Mudalal pt Dihdar Salim			fl. 1700s
Mula Abd‛l Šik		a fighter for the Mandaeans	
Sh. Negm/Nejm	Adam Negm br Zakia Zihrun; Sh. Negm, son of Sh. Zahroon		fl. 1900s
Nṣab br Maškna			
Nṣab br Bihram			
Nukraya br Šitil			
Papa br Guda			
Qinta pt Zihrun Adam		aunt of Yahia Yuhana br Zihrun Adam, Dihdaria	fl. early 1500s
Qiqel			
Ram br Adam, Manduia		ganzibra in Huwaiza	fl. 1560
Ram Bayan br Sam Daudania			
Ram Baktiar br Bihram Šadan, Quṭana			fl. 1560
Ram Yuhana br Ram, Dihdaria, Sabur			fl. 1743–53
Ram Yuhana br Yahia Zihrun, Manduia			
Ram Yuhana br Yahia Baktiar, Kuhailia			c. 1580
Ram Kuhailia		ganzibra in Huwaiza	fl. 1560
Ram Ṣilai br Daimir			
Ram Zihrun br Sam Bihram, Kupašia		survivor of 1831 cholera; cousin of Yahia Bihram; husband of Bibia Mudalal; grandfather of Sh. Abdullah Khaffagi	fl. 1831
Ram Zihrun Bihdad		great-grandson of Zindana	
Ram Ziwa br Bayan Hibil/Bihram Bihdad			
Ram Ziwa br Šaiar		"bad priest"	c. 800
Ram Ziwa Baktiar br Bayan Zihrun		an ancestor of the ethnarch Bihdad br Zihrun	
Ramuia br ‛Qaimat and Bayan Hibil			fl. 638
Ruzba son of Hawa			
Šabur br Zazai			
Šad Manda br Sku Yawar			
Šadan br Brik Yawar			
Šadia Mamania pt Hibil			c. 1300
Šaha pt Aziz Sakma, Wašia			fl. early 1500s
Šaiar (Ziwa) br Bayan Hibil			
Sam Adam br Zakia, Manduia		initiator of his brothers Yahia Mhatam and Sam Yuhana	fl. 1500s
Sam Bihdad br Bihram Gadana			
Sam Bihram br Bibia Mudalal			
Sam Bihram, Laiit, Diqnana			
Sam Šitlan br Ram Bayan, Ša‛puria			fl. 1599
Sam (Ziwa) br Bayan Hibil			
Sam Hibil br Adam		erroneously: "maknušta"	
Sam Yuhana br Mhatam Bulbul, ‛Asikir			
Sam Yuhana br Yahia Adam, ‛Asikir			
Sam Yuhana br Sam Adam, Manduia		brother of Yahia Mhatam br Sam Adam	c. 1560
Sam Saiwia		ganzibra; maternal grandson of Bainai br Haiuna	c. 800
Sarwan Baz		"king of Naṣoraeans"	
Sarwan Bulbul br Adam Bayan, Zarzuia			fl. early 1400s
Šamiat pt Yahia Bayan, Manduia, ‛Kuma		mother of Ram Yuhana br Yahia Zihrun	
Šarat Yasmin pt Zakia, Diqnana		mother of Yahia Bihram br Adam Zarzuia; grandmother of Yasmin Mudalal pt Adam Bihram, Zarzuia	fl. mid-1400s
Šganda br Yasmin and Yahia Yuhana		ethnarch	fl. before 600
Simat pt Adam Yuhana, Zakia and Buhaiir			
Ska Manda			
Sku Hiia br ‛Idai			
Šlama pt Qidra			c. 200
Ṭabia br Zazai			
Yahia br Zihrun, Manduia		ganzibra in Maqdam	fl. 1560
Yahia br Adam Kuhailia			
Yahia Adam br Baktiar Bulbul, Ram Ziwa			fl. 1680
Yahia Adam br Yuhana Šitlan, Riš Draz			
Yahia Adam, Baliq Hiwia			
Yahia Bihram br Adam Yuhana, Sa‛dan, Kamisia		survivor of 1831 cholera	fl. 1831
Yahia Bihram br Adam, Manduia, ‛Kuma			fl. 1735–36
Yahia Bihram br Sam (Sarwan) Bihran, Zakia			c. 1500
Yahia Halal			
Yahia Yuhana br Ram, Kuhailia		brother of Zakia Zihrun	fl. 1600s
Yahia Yuhana (Bihdad/Bihram) br Anuš Bihdad			
Yahia Yuhana br Adam Zihrun, Dihdaria		uncle of Yahia Bihram br Adam Yuhana; nephew of Qinta; exiled 1818 with Sam Bihram and other ganzibras; initiator of eight novices	
Yahia Mhatam br Anuš, clan name Anuš		"head of all Mandaeans," Huwaiza	
Yahia Mhatam br Sam Adam, Manduia, ‛Kuma		brother of Sam Yuhana br Sam Adam	fl. also 1560
Yahia (Ram Zihrun) br Zakia Zihrun		brother of Sh. Negm	fl. 1900s
Yahia Ram Zihrun br Mhatam, Sabur and Batahaiia		grandson of Yahia Yuhana br Adam Zihrun, Dihdaria	fl. 1815–1818
Yahia (Sam) Adam br Sam Saiwia		brother/cousin of Bihdad br Zihrun, both of whom were ethnarchs. He is the maternal grandson of Bainai br Haiuna.	fl. late 800s
Yahia Bayan/Bihram br Sam Bihram, Diquana, Laiit		biologically of the Manduias, but initiated into the Diqnana clan and has three brothers who are priests	
Yahia Sam br Hibil Zihrun		father-in-law of Dihdar Mhatam Bulbul	
Yahia Sam br Sarwan			
Yahia Šaiar br Adam Baktiar, Durakia			
Yahia Zakia br Brik Yawar			c. 600
Yahia Zihrun br Yahia Ram Zihrun			
Yasmin Bana pt Yahia Bihram			
Yasmin Mudalal pt Adam Bihram, Zarzuia		wife of Mhatam Zihrun	fl. 1400s
Yuhana br Zindana			
Yuhana Šitlan br Zakia Šitlan, Buhair			fl. 1480
Yuzaṭaq br Sasa Zakia Bayan br Yuhana/Yahia Bihram, Šapuria			c. 1480
Zakia Šitlan br Sam Yuhana, Bakšia			
Zakia Zihrun br Ram Kuhailia		brother of Yahia Yuhana br Ram	fl. 1677
Zazai of Gawazta br Naṭar			
Zihrun br Yahia Mhatam ‘Asikir			
Zihrun br Adam		a rejected teacher	
Zihrun br Adam, Paraš and ‘Kuma			fl. 1617
