= Yahya Bihram =

19th-century Mandaean priest

Rishama Yahya Bihram
- ࡉࡀࡄࡉࡀ ࡁࡉࡄࡓࡀࡌ
- Title: Ganzibra

Personal life
- Born: c. 1811 Basra Vilayet, Ottoman Empire (now Iraq)
- Died: late 1800s Suq esh-Shuyuk, Basra Vilayet, Ottoman Empire (now Iraq)
- Children: Yasmin Bana (daughter), Mhatam (son), and others
- Parent: Adam Yuhana
- Known for: Revival of the Mandaean priesthood
- Other name: Yahia Bihram
- Occupation: Mandaean priest
- Relatives: Ram Zihrun (cousin); Bibia Mudalal (sister)

Religious life
- Religion: Mandaeism
- Initiation: early 1830s Suq esh-Shuyuk by Ram Zihrun

Senior posting
- Initiated: Ram Zihrun

Yahya Bihram (also spelled Yahia Bihram; Classical Mandaic: ࡉࡀࡄࡉࡀ ࡁࡉࡄࡓࡀࡌ, Modern Mandaic pronunciation: [ˈjeh.ja ˈbɪh.ram]) was a 19th-century Mandaean priest. Although initially a learned layman (yalufa), he became known for reviving the Mandaean priesthood after a cholera epidemic had killed all living Mandaean priests in 1831. He is mentioned in the colophons of various Mandaean manuscripts.

== Early life ==
Yahya Bihram was born around 1811 as the son of the Mandaean ganzibra (high priest) Adam Yuhana (Classical Mandaic: ࡀࡃࡀࡌ ࡉࡅࡄࡀࡍࡀ), and belonged to the Qindila ("lamp"), Kamisia, and Riš Draz families. His father, Adam Yuhana, had previously served as an informant for the British Vice-Consul John George Taylor in Basra and taught him to read the Ginza Rabba. Adam Yuhana also copied the manuscripts DC 12, 38, 39, 41, and 53, which are now held at the Bodleian Library's Drower Collection.

Yahya Bihram spent his childhood in Basra, in his father's large house next to Taylor's house. Taylor collected various Mandaean texts transcribed by Adam Yuhana, which were later donated to the British Library by Taylor's widow in 1860.

== 1831 cholera epidemic ==
From September 1831 A.D. (1247 A.H.) to January 1832, a catastrophic cholera epidemic, which Mandaeans call the muṭana (Classical Mandaic: ࡌࡅࡈࡀࡍࡀ), ravaged the lower Euphrates and Tigris regions of what is now Iraq and Iran. In Shushtar, Iran, about half of the city's inhabitants died. The Mandaean community was hit particularly hard, and all of their priests died in the plague, including Yahya Bihram's own father and many of his relatives. Since Mandaean priests spent much more time in the river than laypeople did, they were especially vulnerable to cholera and all succumbed to the plague as a result. Yahya Bihram told Petermann that there were only 1,500 Mandaeans survivors immediately following the plague.

== Mandaean priesthood revival ==
Yahya Bihram, along with his elder cousin and brother-in-law (paternal uncle's son) Ram Zihrun (Classical Mandaic: ࡓࡀࡌ ࡆࡉࡄࡓࡅࡍ), were two šgandas (priest assistants) who were both also the surviving sons of deceased priests. Ram Zihrun was the son of Sam Bihram, and belonged to the ‘Aziz and Kupašia families. Together, the two of them went on to revive the Mandaean priesthood by initiating each other as tarmida (junior priests), and later as ganzibra (high priests), in Suq eš-Šuyuk, Iraq. As a result, Mandaean manuscripts mention Yahya Bihram as the son of Ram Zihrun, since the priestly initiators of priests and scribes are typically listed as "fathers" in Mandaean spiritual genealogical lineages, rather than their biological fathers. At Suq eš-Šuyuk, they also initiated 13 other yalufa (learned Mandaeans) as priests.

Immediately after the 1831 cholera epidemic, Yahya Bihram widely traveled in the Mandaean areas of Iraq and Iran as he worked to revive the community, including Muhammerah (Khorramshahr), Shushtar, Basra, and many other towns.

== As priest ==
While Ram Zihrun served as a ganzibra priest in the towns of Shushtar and Dezful in Khuzestan, Yahya Bihram stayed on to serve as a ganzibra in the Mandaean quarter of Margab in Suq eš-Šuyuk (Arabic: سوق الشيوخ), a village along the lower Euphrates located in what is now Dhi Qar Governorate in southern Iraq. In Suq eš-Šuyuk, Yahya Bihram and the Mandaean community endured persecution under the local tribal chieftain Thamir ibn Ghadban during the reign of Ottoman ruler Abdülmecid I, as they underwent forced circumcisions, robberies, murders, and starvation.

In 1854, the German philologist Julius Heinrich Petermann worked with Yahya Bihram in Suq eš-Šuyuk to document the Mandaean religion, culture, and language. Yahya Bihram was Petermann's primary informant. Petermann later published accounts of his travels, as well as a Latin translation of the Ginza Rabba, in the 1860s.

Yahya Bihram died in the late 1800s.

== Family ==
According to different manuscript colophons, his children included a daughter, Yasmin (or Yasmin Bana), and a son, Mhatam, both of whom were copyists.

Yahia Bihram's sister Bibia Mudalal, who survived the 1831 cholera epidemic, was a copyist and also a priest. She was married to Ram Zihrun, Yahya Bihram's priestly initiator. Bibia Mudalal was also the grandmother of Sheikh Negm (or Sheikh Nejm), who copied many manuscripts for E. S. Drower. Sheikh Negm was born in Huwaiza, Iran in 1892, lived in Khorramshahr during his early youth, and moved to Qal'at Saleh, Iraq in 1914.

Yahia Bihram's uncle Yahia Yuhana, of the Kuhailia (Persian: Choheili) clan, was also a prominent copyist and ganzibra.

Ram Zihrun was the grandfather of Sheikh Abdullah Khaffagi (or Abdullah Khaffaji) in Ahvaz, and is also the grandfather of Sheikh (Adam) Negm bar (Zakia) Zihrun, who was E. S. Drower's primary copyist and consultant.

== Work as scribe ==
Yahya Bihram was a prolific scribe. He copied at least six of the Mandaic manuscripts that are currently held in the Drower Collection (abbreviated DC), a collection of Mandaic manuscripts collected by E. S. Drower during the early 1900s. These include the DC 35, 24, 47, 43, 28, 37, and 50 manuscripts:

- DC 35, The Baptism of Hibil Ziwa (MHZ): copied in 1831
- DC 24, Scroll of the Parwanaya: copied in 1832 at his sister's son's house, in Muhammerah (now Khorramshahr)
- RRC 4G, Mandaean Book of John, copied in 1832–1833
- DC 47, Pišra ḏ-Šambra "A Phylactery for Rue", copied in 1833
- DC 43, The Poor Priest’s Treasury, copied in 1853
- Strasbourg MS 3.978: copied for Julius Heinrich Petermann in 1853–1854
- DC 28, Pišra ḏ-Bit Mišqal Ainia "The Exorcism of ‘I sought to lift my eyes’": copied in 1855 together with Ram Zihrun, probably in Amarah
- DC 37, "The Exorcism of the Great Overthrower": copied in 1861
- DC 50, "Scroll of the Great Baptism": copied in 1867
- Code Sabéen 4 (Paris Ms. D)

== See also ==
- Bihram
- Ram Zihrun
- Negm bar Zahroon
- List of Mandaean priests (includes many of Yahya Bihram's relatives)
