= Bibia Mudalal =

19th-century Mandaean female priest and scribe

- ࡁࡉࡁࡉࡀ ࡌࡅࡃࡀࡋࡀࡋ

Personal life
- Born: unknown; perhaps c. 1800 Ottoman Empire
- Died: 1800s
- Spouse: Ram Zihrun
- Occupation: Mandaean priest
- Relatives: Yahya Bihram (brother); Negm bar Zahroon (grandson); Abdullah bar Negm (great-grandson); Rafid al-Sabti (great-great-grandson); Ardwan Al-Sabti (great-great-great-grandson)

Religious life
- Religion: Mandaeism

Bibia Mudalal (Classical Mandaic: ࡁࡉࡁࡉࡀ ࡌࡅࡃࡀࡋࡀࡋ, Modern Mandaic pronunciation: [ˈbibi muˈdælæl]) was a 19th-century Mandaean priest and scribe. She was perhaps the last Mandaean female priest. She is known as the wife of Ram Zihrun.

Bibia Mudalal's mother was Hawa Simat, and her father was Adam Yuhana, son of Sam. Her father came from the Kamisia and Riš Draz families. She was a scribe who copied the Ginza Rabba and also a priest who was likely initiated before the 1831 cholera epidemic that killed all of the other Mandaean priests.

Bibia Mudalal was the grandmother of Sheikh Negm (or Sheikh Nejm; born 1892 in Huwaiza, Iran), who copied many manuscripts for E. S. Drower.

== See also ==
- Ram Zihrun
- Yahya Bihram
- Negm bar Zahroon
- List of Mandaean priests
