= Salwan Alkhamas =

Iraqi-Swedish Mandaean priest

Ganzibra Salwan Alkhamas
- سلوان الخماس
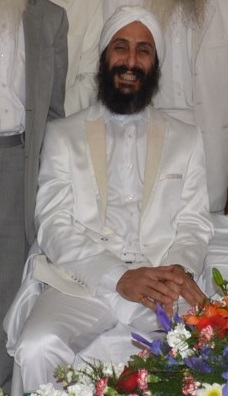
- Salwan Alkhamas at his engagement ceremony in Ahvaz, Iran in 2015
- Title: Ganzibra

Personal life
- Born: 27 March 1970 (age 56) Basra Governorate, Iraq
- Other name: Salwan Shakir Khamas
- Occupation: Mandaean priest

Religious life
- Religion: Mandaeism
- Initiation: Tarmida; November 11, 1989; Baghdad by Abdullah bar Negm
- Initiated: Tarmida Majid Dakhil, Tarmida Asaad Dakhil, Tarmida Maksim Al-Saeedi, Tarmida Thamir Jabbar Shamkhi

Ganzibra Salwan Alkhamas (سلوان الخماس, also known as Salwan Shakir Khamas; born 27 March 1970, Basra Governorate, Iraq) is an Iraqi-Swedish Mandaean priest currently serving as the head priest of the Mandaean community in Sweden.

== Biography ==
Born in Basra Governorate, Salwan Alkhamas moved to Baghdad with his family in 1986 and completed his university studies there. On November 11, 1989, he was ordained as a tarmida by Ganzibra Abdullah bar Negm and then moved to Basra to serve as a Mandaean priest. In 1995, he moved back to Baghdad, and then to Stockholm, Sweden in 1998. He initially served as a priest in Sandviken during the early 2000s. In 2010, Salwan Alkhamas was became a ganzibra. He then became the head priest of the Södertälje mandi and currently serves as the Rishama of the Mandaean community in Sweden and Finland.

Salwan Alkhamas has initiated Tarmida Majid Dakhil (الترميذا ماجد داخل), Tarmida Asaad Dakhil (الترميذا اسعد داخل), Tarmida Maksim Al-Saeedi (الترميذا مكسيم السعيدي), and Tarmida Thamir Jabbar Shamkhi (الترميذا ثامر جابر شمخي).

== See also ==
- List of Mandaean priests
- Mandaeans in Sweden
