= Abdullah Khaffagi =

Iranian Mandaean priest

Sheikh Abdullah Khaffagi
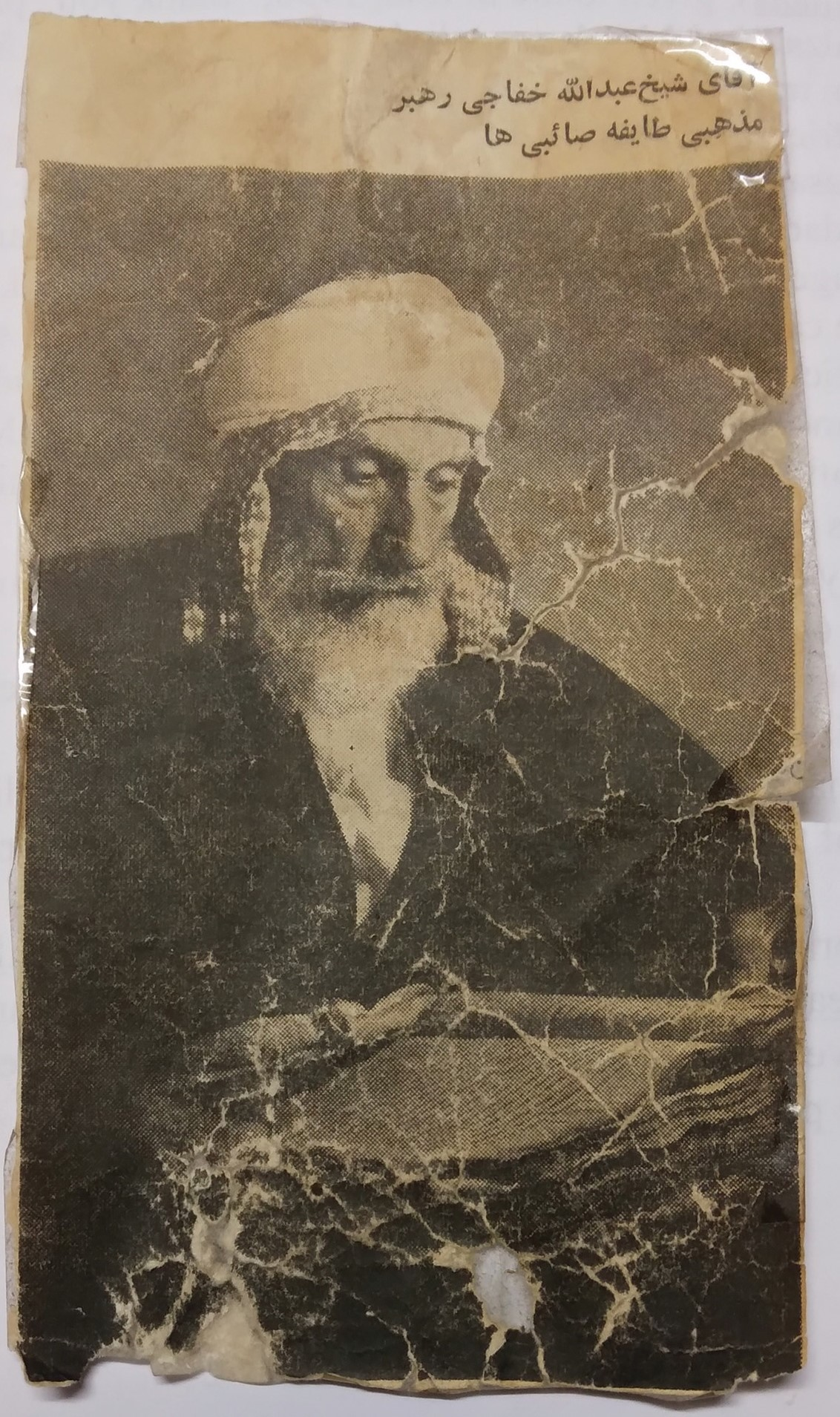
- Abdullah Khaffagi's portrait as printed in an Iranian newspaper from the 1950s or 1960s
- Title: Ganzibra

Personal life
- Born: c. 1880
- Died: 1975 Ahvaz, Iran
- Children: Šarat (Sharat) (wife of Abdullah bar Negm)
- Citizenship: Iranian
- Other name: Sam Yuhana bar Bihram
- Occupation: Mandaean priest
- Relatives: Ganzibra Bahram bar Ram Zihrun (father); Negm bar Zahroon (cousin); Tarmida Adam (cousin); Ganzibra Yahya (cousin); Ram Zihrun (grandfather); Ganzibra Zahroon bar Ram Zihrun (uncle)

Religious life
- Religion: Mandaeism

Sheikh Abdullah Khaffagi (baptismal name: Sam Yuhana bar Bihram ࡎࡀࡌ ࡉࡅࡄࡀࡍࡀ ࡁࡓ ࡁࡉࡄࡓࡀࡌ; Persian: عبدالله خفاجی; Arabic: عبدالله الخفاجي; born c. 1880; died 1975, Ahvaz) was an Iranian Mandaean priest from Ahvaz, Iran. He is a grandson of Ganzibra Ram Zihrun.

== Life ==
Abdullah Khaffagi was born c. 1880 into the Khaffagi (written Mandaic: Kupašia) family. He was the 16th priest in an unbroken lineage of Mandaean priests dating back to the 15th century.

Sheikh Abdullah Khaffagi's daughter Šarat (Sharat) married Rishama Abdullah bar Negm, who is the son of his cousin Ganzibra Negm bar Zahroon.

Abdullah Khaffagi was known for his large collection of Mandaic texts, including the Mandaean Book of John made of lead plates. He died in Ahvaz in 1975 when he was about 95 years old.

== See also ==
- List of Mandaean priests
- Khaffagi family
