= Mandaean name =

Mandaean names can include both birth names (i.e., secular names) and baptismal names (i.e., religious names; also called maṣbuta names or zodiacal names), called malwasha (ࡌࡀࡋࡅࡀࡔࡀ) in Mandaic.

== Birth names ==
Mandaean birth names are secular names that are given at birth and are used by non-Mandaeans to refer to Mandaeans in everyday life.

== Malwasha (baptismal names) ==
In Mandaeism, a baptismal (zodiacal) or masbuta name, also known as malwasha (Classical Mandaic: ࡌࡀࡋࡅࡀࡔࡀ, romanized: malwaša, which can also mean 'zodiac'), is a religious name given by a Mandaean priest to a person, as opposed to a birth name. The baptismal name of a priest reflects his spiritual lineage, with his "spiritual father" being the priest who had initiated him rather than his biological father. Since they are spiritual names that are typically used only within the Mandaean community, Mandaeans may often be reluctant to reveal their baptismal names to non-Mandaeans. As a result, baptismal names are never used as legal names. The malwasha is used to protect a Mandaean from their zodiac sign. This is due to the twelve zodiac constellations being seen as part of the evil spirit Ruha's entourage.

A lay Mandaean's malwasha is linked with the mother's name. For example, Mhattam Yohanna bar Simat (written as Mhatam Yuhana br Simat ࡌࡄࡀࡕࡀࡌ ࡉࡅࡄࡀࡍࡀ ࡁࡓ ࡎࡉࡌࡀࡕ) means "Mhattam Yohanna son of Simat," his mother. When naming a child, the priest takes the zodiac sign of the birth month and calculates the hour of birth sign from the zodiacal circle. The resulting numerical value has the mother's name value subtracted from it. The Book of the Zodiac is consulted to find a Mandaeans malwasha.

For instance, a male child is born at 11 a.m. in Awwal Gita, 1935, on February 4th. His mother's name is Sharat (numerical value 2). The sign for Awwal Gita is Aria. Starting at Aria on the circle but not counting it in, eleven hours gives us Sartana (numerical value 4). Two (for the mother's name) deducted from four, leaves two. The name selected for the child, therefore, is Zahrun, one of the names with a numerical value of two. Thus the infant's full Malwasha is Zahrun bar Sharat, which adds up to four, the number of the Zodiacal sign Sartana.

The colophons of Mandaean texts usually refers to scribes by their malwasha (baptismal) rather than birth names. For example, Ganzibra Jabbar Choheili is referred to in Mandaean texts by his baptismal name Mhatam Yuhana (Classical Mandaic: ࡌࡄࡀࡕࡀࡌ ࡉࡅࡄࡀࡍࡀ).

Although rare, a few non-Mandaeans have also been given Mandaean baptismal names in recognition of their contributions to Mandaean society. MS. DC 2, which was copied by Sheikh Negm in 1933, mentions the Mandaean baptismal name of E. S. Drower as Klila beth Šušian ("Wreath, daughter of Susan"), as her middle name Stefana means 'wreath' in Greek. MS. DC 26, a manuscript copied by Sheikh Faraj for Drower in 1936, contains two qmahas (exorcisms). MS. DC 26 is dedicated to Drower's daughter, Margaret ("Peggy"), who is given the Mandaean baptismal name Marganita beth Klila ("Pearl, daughter of Wreath") in the text.

Below are some auspicious malwašia and their associated numerical values as listed in Book 3 of the Sfar Malwašia.

Male names

1. Ram, Yuhana, Zihan and Mahan, Ram, Ziwa Daimur
2. Zakia, Zihrun, Bhira, Bihdad, Bainia, Zazai, Hurmizdukt
3. Yahia, Maimun, Manduiia, Sukhiia, Saiwia, ʿQaiam
4. Bayan, Bulbul, Sku-Yawar, Bulfaraz, Ram-Šilai
5. Sam Paiiš, Ramuia, Šabur, Sabur, Šad-Manda
6. Bihram, Šitil, Sarwan, ʿQaiam, Tibit, Zandana, Brik-Yawar, Zakia-Yawar
7. Mhatam (Mhattam), Bihram, Sandan, Malia
8. Šaiar, Ziwa, Šadan, Naṭar
9. Anuš, Hibil, Ruzbia, Samuiia, Naṭar
10. Adam, Baktiar, Baṭia, Zakria
11. Br-Hiia, Šitlan, Nṣab, Zangia
12. Gadana, Šitluia

Female names

1. Hawa, Dihgan, Škinta, Haiuna, Mdinat, Mamuia
2. Šarat, Samra, Pašta
3. Šadia, Yasmin, Ruhmaita-Hiia, Daia, Dukta, Handa
4. Mudalal, Rhima, Mihrizad
5. Anhar, Kaizariʿil
6. Mahnuš, Bana, Dinartia, Kumraita
7. Simat, Murwaria, Buran, Dmut-Hiia
8. Simat-Hiia, Sindaita, Šahmia
9. Qinta, Anat-Hiia, Kisna, Rhimat-Hiia
10. Mamania, Marganita, ʿQaimat, Zadia, Suta
11. Murwarid, Manu-Qinta, Paiwia
12. Bibia, Maliha, Nargis, Biṣam

== Matronymic names ==
Lay Mandaeans historically did not have actual family names or surnames, but were rather referred to by the names of their mothers in their malwasha using the prefix bar (written as ࡁࡓ br in the Mandaic script) for a male and beth (written as ࡐࡕ pt in the Mandaic script) for a female, such as Mhattam Yohanna bar Simat and Mahnash beth Simat respectively. Early priests or religious leaders such as Anush bar Danqa and Zazai d-Gawazta bar Hawa used matronymic names, as well as the earliest Mandaean scribe Shlama beth Qidra. Ganzibra Jabbar Choheili's matronymic malwasha is Mhatam Yuhana bar Sharat.

== Patronymic names ==
Modern priests are an exception and named after their fathers if they were also priests. An example name would be Mhatam Zihrun bar Adam ("Mhatam Zihrun, son of Adam"), which is the malwasha baptismal name of Ganzibra Dakhil Aidan (his birth name). Ganzibra Jabbar Choheili's patronymic malwasha is Mhatam Yuhana bar Yahya. Birth or secular names (not malwasha) are also patronymic. An example is Lamia Abbas Amara; Lamia is her given name, while Abbas is her father's name, and Amara is her paternal grandfather's name.

== Surnames ==
Today, Mandaeans are officially registered with surnames that are derived from the names of their clans, such as Choheili (the Persian pronunciation of Kuhailia, a Mandaean clan or extended family).

Historically, some Mandaeans have also been known as Al-Ṣābi’ (Arabic: الصابئ, lit. 'Sabian'), such as Hilal al-Sabi'.

== See also ==
- Choheili family
- Khaffagi family
- Bihram
- Christian name
- Jewish name
- Naming ceremony
- Papal name
- Religious name
