= Religious name =

Given name bestowed for a religious purpose

A religious name is a type of given name bestowed for religious purposes, and which is generally used in such contexts.

== Christianity ==
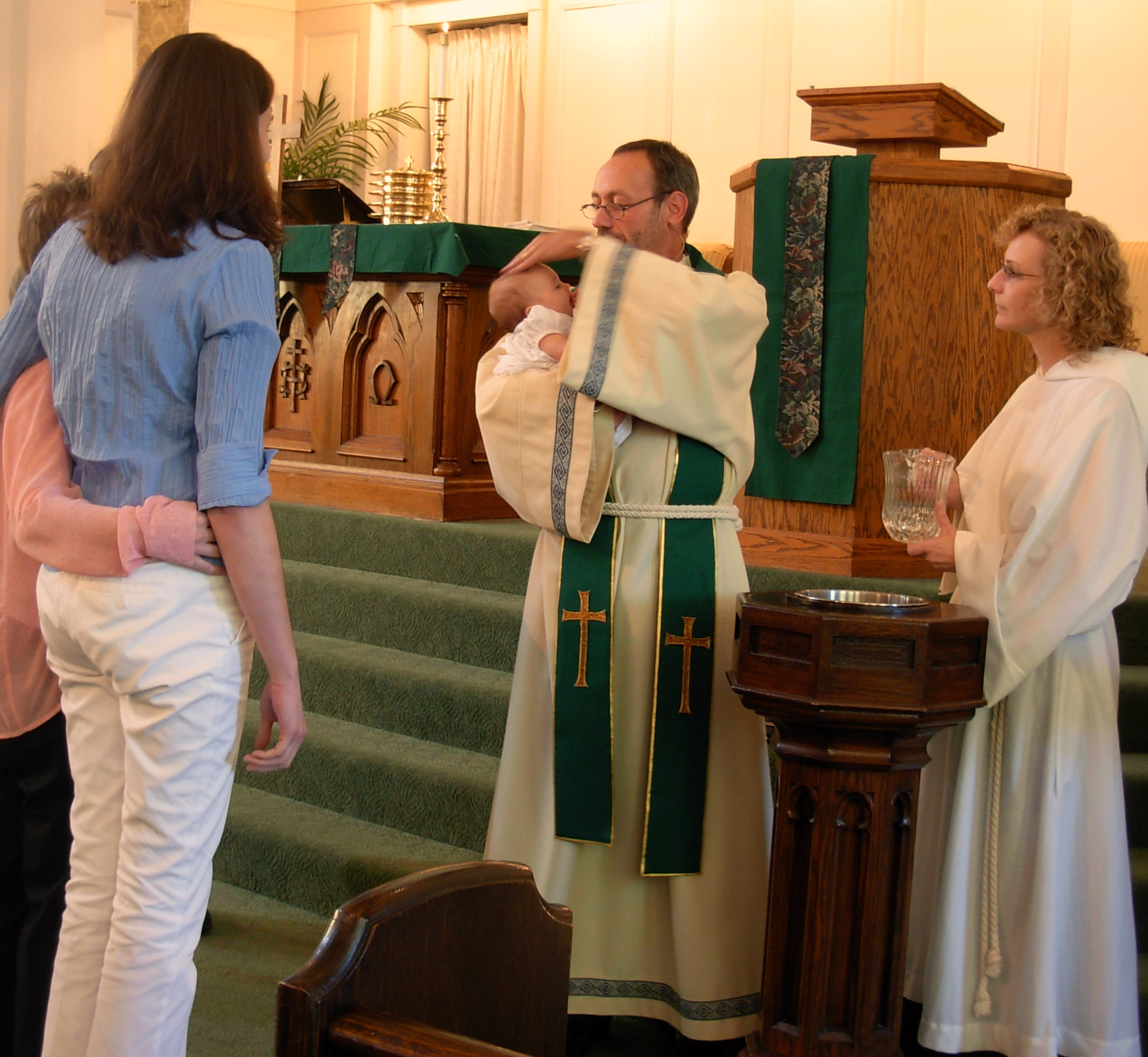
In many Christian traditions, those who receive the sacrament of baptism are given a Christian name by which they become known.

=== Catholic Church ===
==== Baptismal name ====
In baptism, Catholics are given a Christian name, which should not be "foreign to Christian sentiment" and is often the name of a saint. In East Asia, in Africa and elsewhere, the baptismal name is distinct from the traditional-style given name.

Traditionally, Orthodox and Catholic Christians celebrate their name day (i.e., the feast day of their patron saint), in addition to their birthday.

==== Confirmation name ====
In some countries, it is common to adopt a confirmation name, always the name of a saint, in addition to the baptismal name. The saint whose name is taken is henceforth considered to be a patron saint.

==== Religious name ====
In general, religious names are used among the persons of the consecrated life. In most religious institutes, a new member is traditionally either given a religious name or chooses one. This could be either the name of a beatified or a venerable of the church, an honorific title of the Virgin Mary, or even a virtue or something similar. Apart from that, it is also possible for a person in religious life to continue to use their baptismal name. The name is taken usually either upon investiture or on the occasion of taking the first vows, but in some communities it takes place prior to the entry of a new postulant.

==== Papal name ====
A newly elected pope traditionally takes on a new name, called his regnal name or papal name.

=== Lutheran Church ===
In the Lutheran Churches, those who receive the sacrament of baptism are given a Christian name.

=== Eastern Church ===
==== Baptismal name ====
In the Eastern Orthodox Church and Eastern Catholicism, converts often take a new name at the time of their reception into the church. When deciding on a name for their child, Orthodox parents will often name the child after a saint whose feast day falls on either the day of the child's birth or the day of its baptism.

==== Monastic name ====
Orthodox and Eastern catholic monks and nuns are often given a new monastic name at the time of their investiture.

== Mandaeism ==
In Mandaeism, a baptismal (zodiacal) or masbuta name, also known as malwasha, is a name given by a priest, as opposed to a legal name. Mandaeans have matronymic Mandaean names which are used in Mandaean rituals. A malwasha is linked with the mother's name and time of birth in order to protect the individual from their zodiac sign which is considered ominous.

== Buddhism ==
All Buddhist denominations also practice this, with newly ordained Sangha members given new Buddhist names by their master or preceptors. Lay Buddhists (Upāsaka and Upāsikā) are also given Buddhist names during their Tisarana ceremony.

== See also ==
- Theophoric name
- Surnames of Russian Orthodox clergy
