= Khaffagi family =

Mandaean family

Khaffagi family ࡊࡅࡐࡀࡔࡉࡀ Kupašia
- Family
- Country: Iraq and Iran
- Current region: Lower Mesopotamia and Khuzestan
- Origin: Iran and Iraq
- Members: Ram Zihrun, Abdullah Khaffagi, Negm bar Zahroon, Abdullah bar Negm, Rafid al-Sabti
- Connected families: Choheili family
- Traditions: Mandaean priestly family

The Khaffagi family (also spelled Khaffagy, Khaffajy, Khafajy; Persian: خفاجی; Arabic: خفاجي or الخفاجي; written Mandaic: Kupašia ࡊࡅࡐࡀࡔࡉࡀ) is a Mandaean priestly family with origins in Khuzestan, Iran, although some family members also lived in southern Iraq. The family's genealogy can be traced back to at least the mid-1400s (and possibly the 1200s) in Khuzestan.

The family contains over 26 generations of priests.

Other Mandaean priestly families include the Manduia, Kuhailia (Choheili), and Durakia (Dorragi) lineages, the latter two with origins primarily in Khuzestan, Iran.

== Family members ==
Notable family members include:

- Ram Zihrun (late 1700s–1800s)
- Abdullah Khaffagi (c. 1880–1975); baptismal name: Sam Yuhana bar Bihram bar Ram Zihrun
- Negm bar Zahroon (1892–1976); baptismal name: Adam Negm bar Zakia Zihrun bar Ram Zihrun
- Abdullah bar Negm (early 1900s–2009)
- Rafid al-Sabti (born 1965)
- Ardwan Al-Sabti
- Bihram Khaffagi, a tarmida in Ahvaz, Iran

During the 21st century, some members of the family are now based in Nijmegen, Netherlands, where many of the family's Mandaic manuscripts are now archived as part of the Rbai Rafid Collection (RRC). Other manuscripts belonging to the family are currently being held in Ahvaz, Iran and Baghdad, Iraq.

== See also ==
- List of Mandaean priests
- Choheili family
