= Negm bar Zahroon =

19th-century Mandaean priest

Ganzibra Negm bar Zahroon
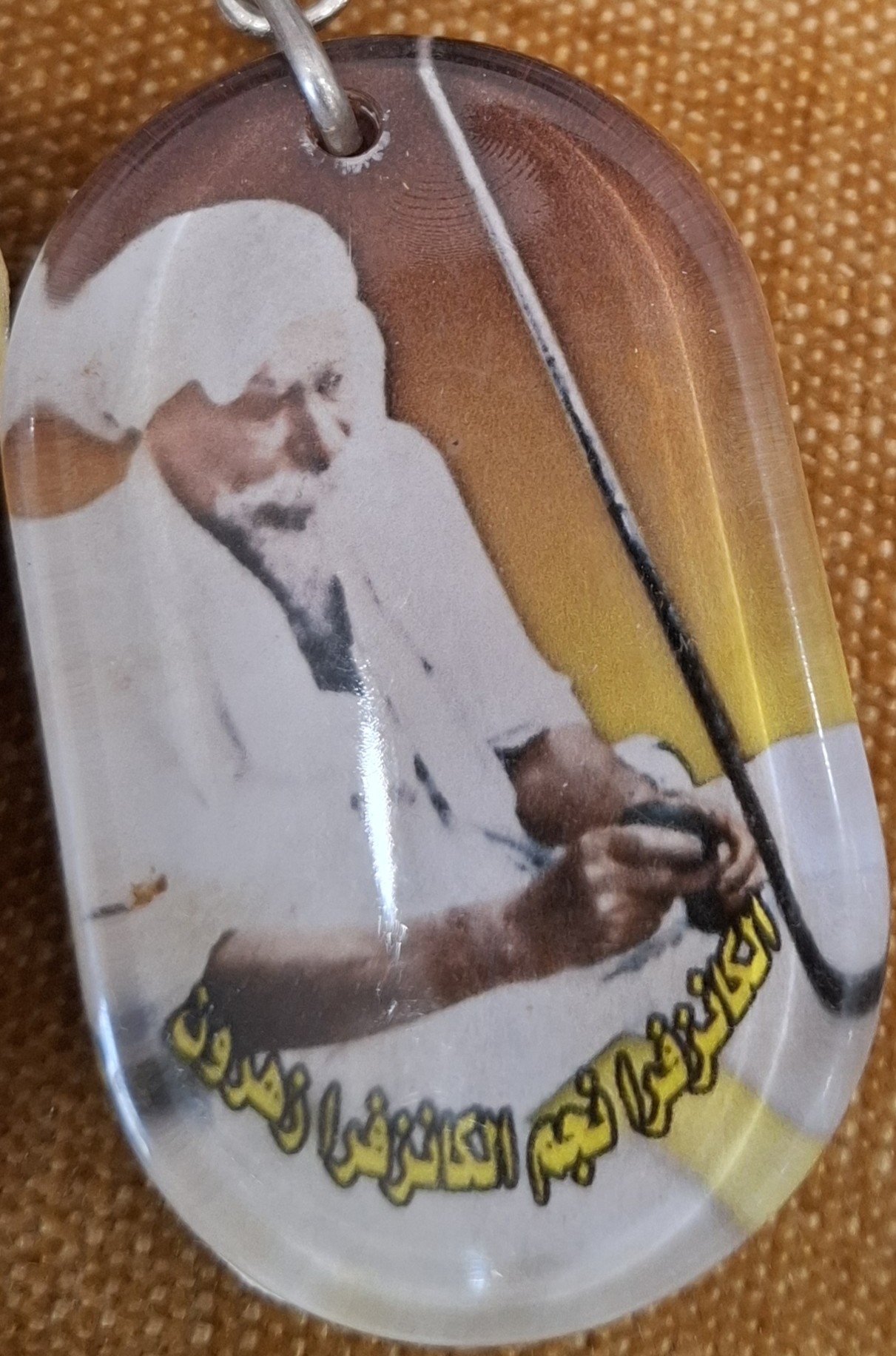
- A keychain with a portrait of Negm bar Zahroon
- Title: Ganzibra

Personal life
- Born: 1892 Huwaiza, Qajar Iran
- Died: 1976 (aged 83–84) Qal'at Saleh, Iraq
- Children: Rabbi Abdullah bar Negm
- Citizenship: Iraqi
- Known for: Procuring and copying Drower Collection manuscripts
- Other name: Adam Negm bar Zakia Zihrun
- Occupation: Mandaean priest
- Relatives: Abdullah Khaffagi (cousin); Ram Zihrun (grandfather); Bibia Mudalal (grandmother); Rafid al-Sabti (grandson); Tarmida Adam (brother); Ganzibra Yahya (brother)

Religious life
- Religion: Mandaeism
- Initiation: Tarmida; 1920; Liṭlaṭa, Qal'at Saleh by Sheikh Damouk and Sheikh Sahan

Senior posting
- Initiated: Abdullah bar Negm

Ganzibra Negm bar Zahroon (baptismal name: Adam Negm bar Zakia Zihrun ࡀࡃࡀࡌ ࡍࡉࡂࡌ ࡁࡓ ࡆࡀࡊࡉࡀ ࡆࡉࡄࡓࡅࡍ; Arabic: الشيخ نجم ابن زهرون; born 1892, Huwaiza; died 1976, Qal'at Saleh District) was a Mandaean priest. He is known for his role as E. S. Drower's main field consultant who helped her procure dozens of Mandaic texts, now kept in the Bodleian Library's Drower Collection.

== Names ==
He is often known simply as Sheikh Negm or Sheikh Nejm in E. S. Drower's writings. His Mandaean baptismal name is Adam Negm bar Zakia Zihrun bar Ram Zihrun (or also Negm bar Zihrun ࡍࡉࡂࡌ ࡁࡓ ࡆࡉࡄࡓࡅࡍ). In his letters to Drower, he refers to himself as Sheikh Negm, son of Sheikh Zahroon.

== Life ==
Sheikh Negm was born in Huwaiza in 1892 into the Khaffagi (written Mandaic: Kupašia) clan. He lived in Khorramshahr during his early youth. He later moved to Liṭlaṭa, Qal'at Saleh in 1914, where he was later initiated as a tarmida. He became acquainted with E. S. Drower sometime before 1933, with whom he had a lifelong collaboration. He helped Drower obtain many of the Mandaic manuscripts in the Drower Collection, typically by serving as an agent to help purchase them, but at times also copied some of Mandaic texts himself. Drower Mss. 2, 4, 15, 22, 23, 28–32, 34, 35, 38–41, 43, 44, and others were obtained via the assistance of Sheikh Negm.

In 1920, he was initiated as a tarmida (junior priest) by two ganzibras from the Manduia clan, namely Sheikh Damouk (baptismal name: Mhatam Yuhana bar Yahya Sam), who is Lamea Abbas Amara's great-grandfather), and by Sheikh Sahan (an uncle of Sheikh Sam, the great-grandfather of Sinan Abdullah of Niskayuna, New York). In 1947, he was ordained as a ganzibra (senior priest). That same year, Sheikh Negm initiated his son Abdullah as a tarmida. Abdullah later married Sheikh Abdullah Khaffagi's daughter Šarat (Sharat) from Ahvaz.

From 2 February 1936 to 1 February 1950, Sheikh Negm wrote letters to Drower mostly while she resided in Baghdad (with a few letters also sent to England), using seven different scribes who could write in English. A few letters were also written in Neo-Mandaic (colloquial Mandaic). Many of Sheikh Negm's letters date to 1939.

Sheikh Negm died in 1976.

== Family ==
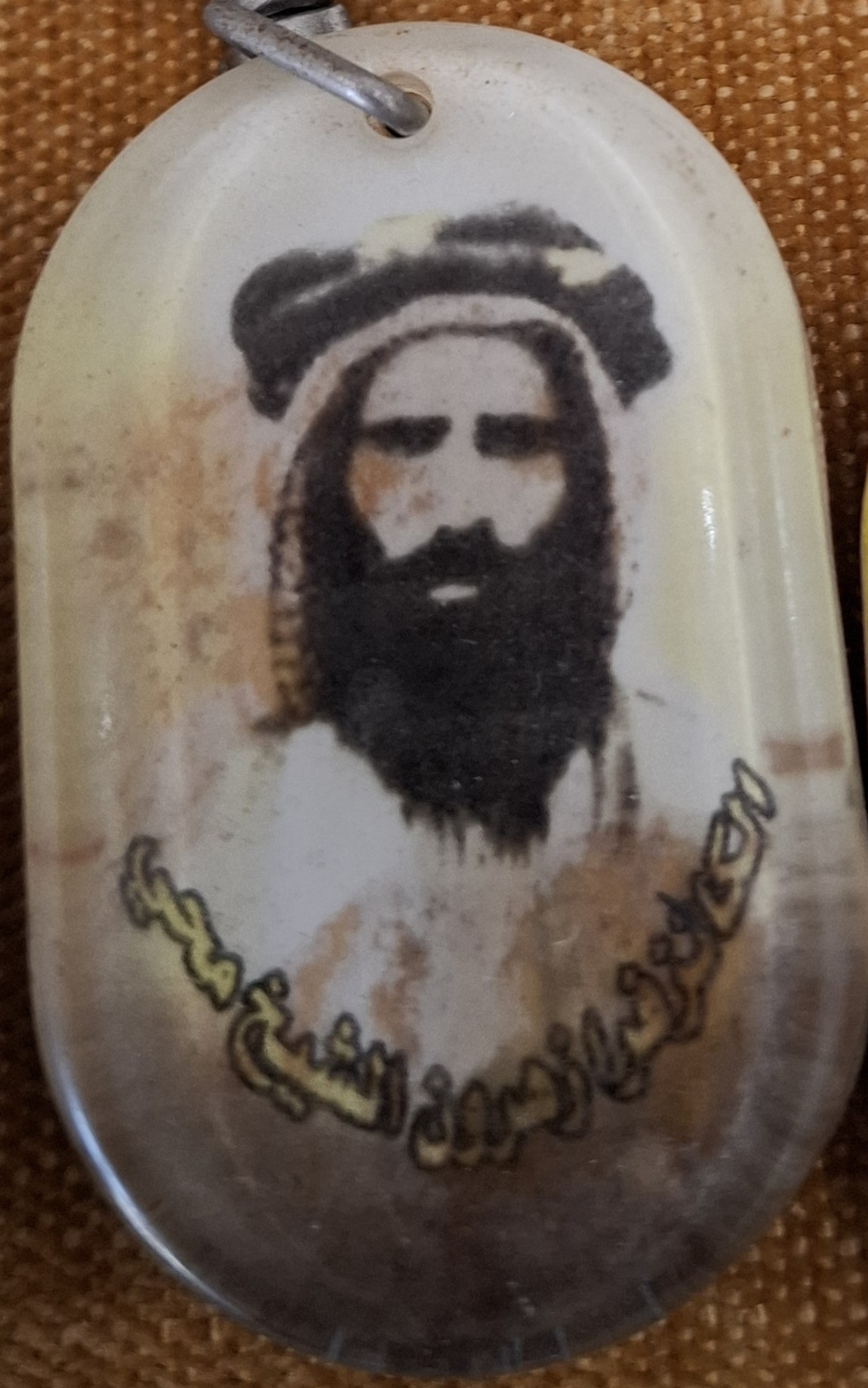
A keychain with a portrait of Ganzibra Zahroon, the father of Ganzibra Negm

Negm bar Zahroon's father and Abdullah Khaffagi's father were both the sons of Ram Zihrun, one of the survivors of the 1831 cholera epidemic that nearly wiped out the Mandaean priesthood. Yahya Bihram was Sheikh Negm's grandfather's cousin and brother-in-law.

His brother was Yahya bar Zakia Zihrun (Mandaean baptismal name: Ram Zihrun bar Zakia Zihrun).

His son, Sheikh Abdullah of Baghdad, was a rishama who later emigrated to the United Kingdom, and died in the Netherlands in 2009. Sheikh Abdullah bar Negm was known for initiating Sheikh Haithem (now known as Brikha Nasoraia, a ganzibra and professor living in Sydney, Australia) into the priesthood in Iraq. Rafid al-Sabti, a tarmida currently residing in Nijmegen, Netherlands, is the son of Sheikh Abdullah, and is hence also Sheikh Negm's grandson.

Negm bar Zahroon's nephew Abdelelah Khalaf al-Sebahi, who was educated in Moscow when Iraq had close ties with the USSR, currently lives in Denmark.

== See also ==
- List of Mandaean priests
