= Ram Zihrun =

19th-century Mandaean priest

Ganzibra Ram Zihrun
- ࡓࡀࡌ ࡆࡉࡄࡓࡅࡍ
- Title: Ganzibra

Personal life
- Born: late 1700s Ottoman Empire
- Died: 1800s
- Spouse: Bibia Mudalal (Yahya Bihram's sister)
- Parent: Sam Bihram (father)
- Known for: Revival of the Mandaean priesthood
- Other names: Ram Zihrun bar Sam Bihram; Sheikh Abdullah
- Occupation: Mandaean priest
- Relatives: Yahya Bihram (cousin); Negm bar Zahroon (grandson); Abdullah bar Negm (great-grandson); Rafid al-Sabti (great-great-grandson); Ardwan Al-Sabti (great-great-great-grandson)

Religious life
- Religion: Mandaeism
- Initiation: early 1830s Suq esh-Shuyuk by Yahya Bihram

Senior posting
- Initiated: Yahya Bihram

Ram Zihrun (Classical Mandaic: ࡓࡀࡌ ࡆࡉࡄࡓࡅࡍ, Modern Mandaic pronunciation: [ˈrɑm ˈzɪh.rʊn]) was a 19th-century Mandaean priest. Although initially a learned layman (yalufa), he became known for reviving the Mandaean priesthood together with his cousin Yahya Bihram after a cholera epidemic had killed all living Mandaean priests in 1831. He is mentioned in the colophons of various Mandaean manuscripts.

Ram Zihrun was also informally known by Mandaeans as Sheikh Abdullah.

== Early life ==
Ram Zihrun was born sometime during the 18th century as the son of the Mandaean priest Sam Bihram (Classical Mandaic: ࡎࡀࡌ ࡁࡉࡄࡓࡀࡌ), and belonged to the ‘Aziz and Kupašia (Khaffagi) families.

== Mandaean priesthood revival ==
Ram Zihrun and his younger cousin Yahya Bihram were two šgandas (priest assistants) who were the surviving sons of deceased priests during the aftermath of the 1831 cholera epidemic. Together, the two of them went on to revive the Mandaean priesthood by initiating each other as tarmida (junior priests), and later as ganzibra (high priests), in Suq eš-Šuyuk, Iraq. As a result, Mandaean manuscripts mention Yahya Bihram as the son of Ram Zihrun, since the priestly initiators of priests and scribes are typically listed as "fathers" in Mandaean spiritual genealogical lineages, rather than their biological fathers. At Suq eš-Šuyuk, they also initiated 13 other yalufa (learned Mandaeans) as priests.

Afterwards, Ram Zihrun served as a ganzibra in the towns of Shushtar and Dezful in Khuzestan.

Ram Zihrun died sometime in the mid or late 1800s.

== Family ==
Ram Zihrun's wife Bibia Mudalal, who was Yahya Bihram's sister, survived the 1831 cholera epidemic. Her father came from the Kamisia and Riš Draz families. She was a scribe who copied the Ginza Rabba and also a priest who was likely initiated before the 1831 cholera epidemic. Bibia Mudalal was also the grandmother of Sheikh Negm (or Sheikh Nejm), who copied many manuscripts for E. S. Drower. Sheikh Negm was born in Huwaiza, Iran in 1892, lived in Khorramshahr during his early youth, and moved to Qal'at Saleh, Iraq in 1914.

Ram Zihrun was also the grandfather of Sheikh Abdullah Khaffagi (or Abdullah Khaffaji) in Ahvaz.

== Work as scribe ==
Ram Zihrun personally copied a few of the Mandaic manuscripts that are currently held in the Drower Collection (abbreviated DC), a collection of Mandaic manuscripts collected by E. S. Drower during the early 1900s. These include the DC 7 (Scroll of the Rivers), DC 9 (Haran Gawaita), and DC 22 (Ginza Rabba) manuscripts.

== See also ==
- Zihrun
- Yahya Bihram
- Negm bar Zahroon
- List of Mandaean priests (includes many of Ram Zihrun's relatives)
