= MS Drower 43 =

Mandaic manuscript

- Bodleian Library
- Also known as: DC 43
- Type: Scroll
- Date: 1270 A.H. (1853 A.D.)
- Place of origin: Lower Mesopotamia
- Language: Mandaic
- Scribe: Yahya Bihram
- Script: Mandaic
- Contents: Qmaha texts used for exorcism and magic

MS Drower 43 (typically abbreviated as DC 43) is a Mandaic manuscript that contains over a dozen qmaha texts (i.e., amulet formulae) used for exorcism and protection against evil. It is part of the Drower Collection in the Bodleian Library at the University of Oxford.

== History ==
The manuscript was purchased by E. S. Drower from Sheikh Nejm bar Zahroon in 1939 and was copied in 1270 A.H. (1853 A.D.) in the marshlands in the territory of the Kit bin Sa'ad, by Yahia Bihram br Adam Yuhana. DC 23b contains a variant of one of the qmahas.

A brief study of the manuscript has been published by Bogdan Burtea (2005).

== Contents ==
Also known as the Poor Priest's Treasury, the manuscript is a Mandaic-language scroll consisting of qmahas used for exorcism and magic. The contents are as follows, with links also provided to transliterated texts in the Comprehensive Aramaic Lexicon (CAL).

- Qmaha ḏ-Ṣir Sahria (DC 43A). CAL text of DC 43A.
- Qmaha ḏ-Šiul (DC 43B)
- three related texts (DC 43C; see DC 33). CAL text of DC 43C.
  - Šuba libišna
  - ʿSirna hthimna
  - Yawar Ziwa nišimtai (see DC 33)
- Šalhafta ḏ-Mahria (DC 43D; see DC 19). CAL text of DC 43D
- Qmaha ḏ-Dahlulia (DC 43E; see DC 20)
- Qmaha ḏ-Gastata (DC 43F). CAL text of DC 43F.
- Qmaha ḏ-Br ʿngaria (DC 43G)
  - Qmaha ḏ-Br ʿngaria (DC 43G I). CAL text of DC 43G I.
  - Qmaha ḏ-Br ʿngaria Zuṭa (DC 43G II). CAL text of DC 43G II.
- Qmaha ḏ-Yurba (DC 43H). CAL text of DC 43H.
- Qmaha ḏ-Šuba (DC 43I). CAL text of DC 43I.
- Qmaha ḏ-Qaština (DC 43J; see DC 39 and its copy in Bodleian, and also MS Syr. G 2 (R)).

== See also ==
- List of Mandaic manuscripts
- Incantation bowl
- Mandaic lead rolls
