= Abdullah bar Negm =

20th-century Iraqi Mandaean priest

Sheikh Abdullah bar Negm
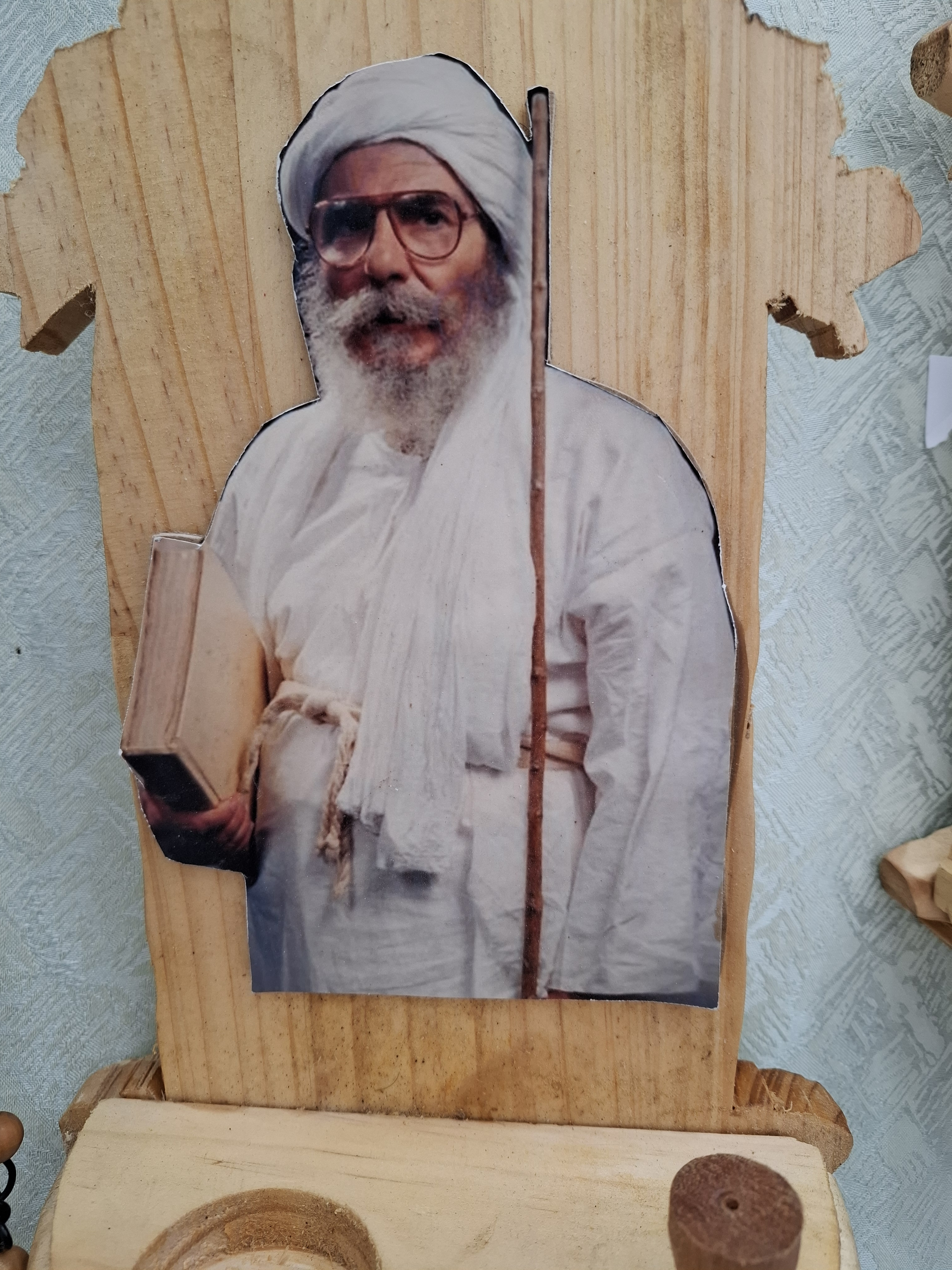
- A portrait of Abdullah bar Negm mounted on a wooden stand
- Title: Rishama of Baghdad

Personal life
- Born: 1947 Qal'at Saleh, Iraq
- Died: 4 March 2010 (aged 62–63) Nijmegen, Netherlands
- Spouse: Sharat (daughter of Abdullah Khaffagi)
- Children: Rafid al-Sabti
- Parent: Negm bar Zahroon (father)
- Citizenship: Iraqi
- Occupation: Mandaean priest
- Relatives: Ram Zihrun (great-grandfather)

Religious life
- Religion: Mandaeism
- Initiation: Tarmida; 1945 by Negm bar Zahroon

Senior posting
- Predecessor: Abdullah bar Sam
- Successor: Sattar Jabbar Hilow
- Initiated: Brikha Nasoraia; Rafid al-Sabti; Salwan Alkhamas

Sheikh (Rishama) Abdullah bar Negm (Arabic: عبدالله ابن نجم; born in Qal'at Saleh, Iraq; 1947 – 4 March 2010, Nijmegen, Netherlands) was an Iraqi Mandaean priest who served as the Rishama (Mandaean patriarch) of Baghdad, Iraq from 1981 to 1999.

== Life ==
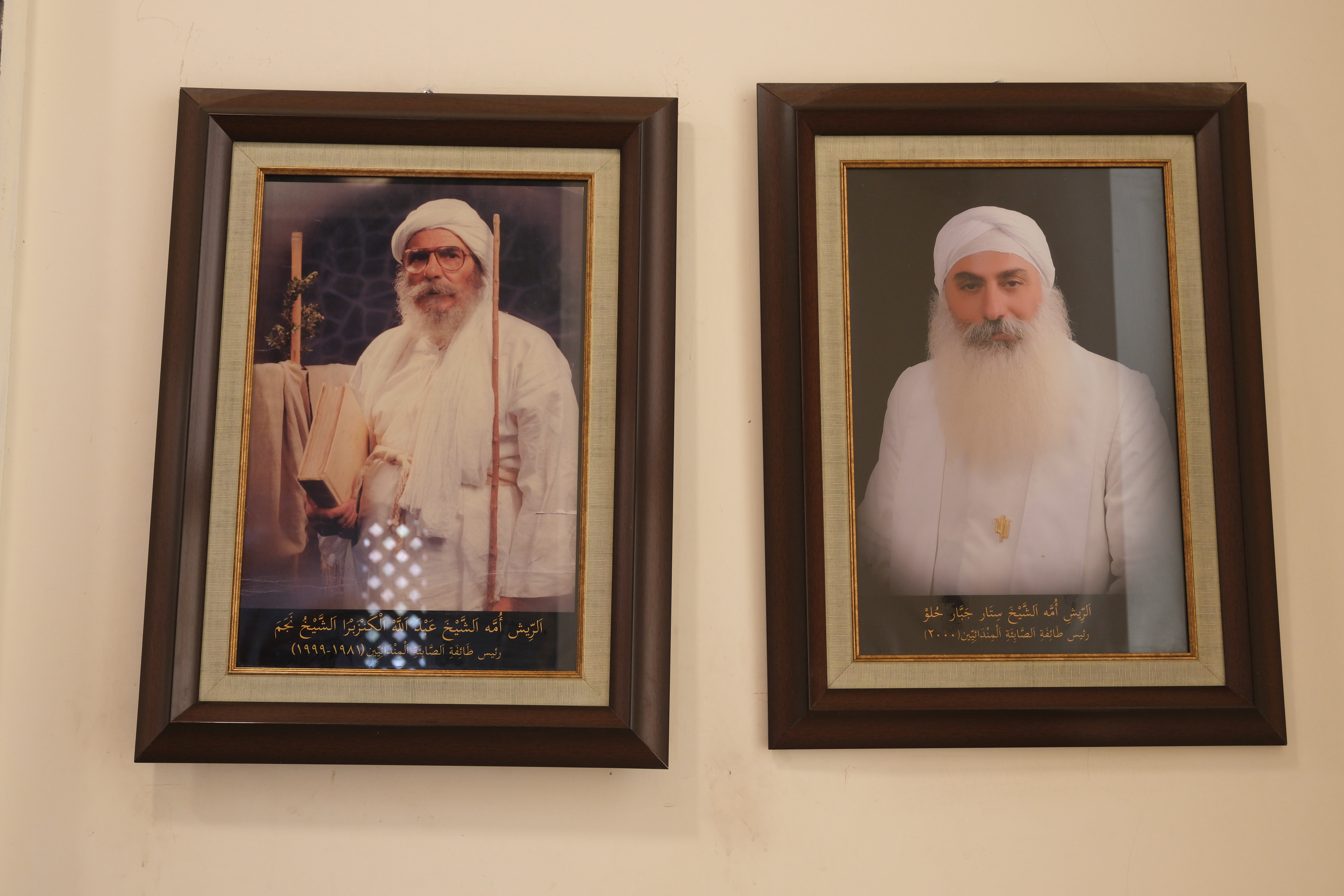
A portrait of Rishama Abdullah bar Negm (left) next to a portrait of Rishama Sattar Jabbar Hilow (right) at the Sabian–Mandaean Mandi of Baghdad

Rabbi Negm was born into the Khaffagi (written Mandaic: Kupašia) clan. In 1947, his father, Rabbi Negm bar Zahroon, who had just become a ganzibra that same year, initiated him into the Mandaean priesthood. Abdullah bar Negm's ordination was mentioned in his father's two-page letter to E. S. Drower, which was dated February 4, 1948.

Abdullah bar Negm married Rabbi Abdullah Khaffagi's daughter Šarat (Sharat) from Ahvaz, Iran. Rafid al-Sabti, a tarmida currently residing in Nijmegen, Netherlands, is the son of Rabbi Abdullah.

Abdullah bar Negm became Rishama of Baghdad after Dakhil Aidan's death in 1964.

Rishama Abdullah bar Negm was known for initiating Sheikh Haithem (now known as Brikha Nasoraia, a ganzibra and professor living in Sydney, Australia) into the priesthood in Iraq, as well as the majority of well-known Mandaean priests in the diaspora (including Ganzibra Salwan Alkhamas).

He later emigrated with his wife to the United Kingdom. After his wife died in the United Kingdom, Abdullah bar Negm moved to Nijmegen, Netherlands to be with his family members. He died in the Netherlands in 2010.

== Family ==
Abdullah bar Negm's grandfather is the son of Ram Zihrun, one of the survivors of the 1831 cholera epidemic that nearly wiped out the Mandaean priesthood.

== See also ==
- List of Mandaean priests

Preceded by Abdullah bar Sam	Rishama (Iraq); 1981–1999	Succeeded by Sattar Jabbar Hilow
