= Yuhana Nashmi =

Iraqi-Australian visual artist

Tarmida Yuhana Nashmi
- يوهانا النشمي
- Born: Ala’a Nashmi (Arabic: علاء النشمي); Baghdad, Iraq
- Notable work: 100 Souls 100 Stories 100 Tiles
- Style: Contemporary art; Mandaean art
- Website: www.neshmart.com

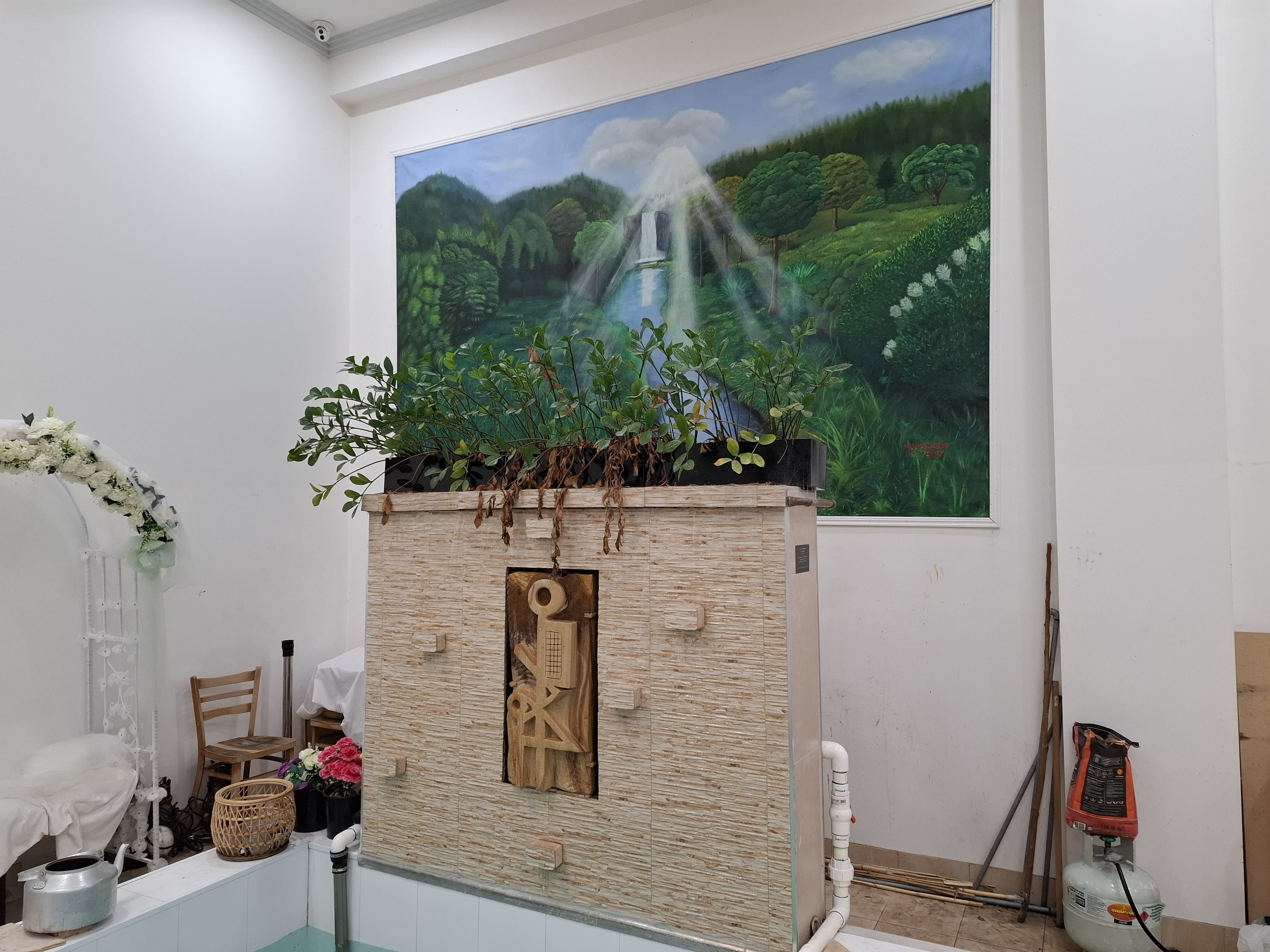
Artwork by Yuhana Nashmi, installed at the front of Yahya Yuhana Mandi's indoor baptismal pool

Yuhana Nashmi (Arabic: يوهانا النشمي; Mandaic: ࡉࡅࡄࡀࡍࡀ ࡍࡀࡔࡌࡉ, Modern Mandaic pronunciation: [juˈhɑna ˈnaʃmi]; also known as Sheikh Alaa Nashmi or Ala’a Nashmi; علاء النشمي) is an Iraqi-Australian visual artist and ceramicist.

== Early life ==
Nashmi was born in Baghdad, Iraq. His malwasha (baptismal name) is Ram bar Sharat Semat (Classical Mandaic: ࡓࡀࡌ ࡁࡓ ࡔࡀࡓࡀࡕ ࡎࡉࡌࡀࡕ, romanized: Ram br Šarat Simat). In Iraq, he was initiated as a tarmida. He immigrated to Australia in the early 2000s after living in Amman, Jordan from 1998–2000.

== Career ==
In the mid-2010s, Nashmi collaborated with Christine Robins (née Allison) of the University of Exeter on The Worlds of Mandaean Priests project to document the Mandaean priesthood. Nashmi served as a field worker and cultural consultant for the project.

In 2018, Nashmi created Sh-ken-ta, an exhibition of a shkinta (reed house used for Mandaean priestly rituals), as a site-specific installation at the Casula Powerhouse Arts Centre.

In 2020, Nashmi published the book 100 Souls 100 Stories 100 Tiles, a collection of 100 ceramic tiles made by members of the Mandaean community in Australia. The tiles have been exhibited at the Campbelltown Arts Centre.

Nashmi also exhibited artwork at the Georges River in 2022. As of 2023, he currently works in art psychotherapy and ceramics tutoring, and runs NeshmART Studio in the Sydney metropolitan area.

== Personal life ==
Nashmi has a Labrador Retriever named Neshma (Classical Mandaic: ࡍࡉࡔࡌࡀ, romanized: Nišma, lit. 'Soul'; pronounced [ˈniʃma]), who also works as a therapy dog.

== Bibliography ==
- Nickerson, Angela; Melhem, Esber; Steel, Zachary; Nashmi, Yuhana; Bryant, Richard; Al-Zuhairi, Bushra; Silove, Derrick; Al-Zuhairi, Fayhaa; Touze, Dominique Le (2008). The Wellbeing of Sydney Mandaeans. ISBN 978-0-646-50464-3.
