= Rishama =

Chief priest in Mandaeism

A rishama (rišama; riš-ama), rishamma, or rishema (Classical Mandaic: ࡓࡉࡔࡀࡌࡀ, lit. ''head/leader of the people''; Modern Mandaic: rišammā; Arabic: ريش امّة; Persian: ریشا اد اما) is a religious patriarch in Mandaeism. It is the highest rank out of all the Mandaean clergical ranks. The next ranks are the ganzibra and tarmida priests (see Mandaean priest).

In Iraq, the current rishama is Sattar Jabbar Hilow. In Australia, there are two rishamas, namely Salah Choheili and Brikha Nasoraia.

== Etymology ==
The Mandaic term rišama is derived from the words riš 'head' and ama 'people'. Although the term for the Mandaean daily minor ablution is also spelled the same in written Classical Mandaic (rišama), the word for 'minor ablution' is pronounced in Modern Mandaic as rešāmā, while 'head priest' is pronounced rišammā.

== Notable rishama or patriarchs ==
=== Pre-20th century ===
- Zazai d-Gawazta bar Hawa, patriarch datable to around the year 270 CE and earliest known copyist of Alma Rišaia Zuṭa, Qulasta, The Thousand and Twelve Questions, The Baptism of Hibil Ziwa, Scroll of Exalted Kingship, and The Wedding of the Great Šišlam. The Ginza Rabba, however, predates Zazai's time.
- Anush bar Danqa, the leader of the Mandaeans, who appeared before Muslim authorities at the beginning of the Muslim conquest of Persia
- Yahya Bihram, who revived the entire Mandaean priesthood during the 1830s
- Ram Zihrun, who revived the Mandaean priesthood during the 1830s together with his younger cousin Yahya Bihram

=== 20th and 21st centuries ===
Iraq

- Dakhil Aidan (1881–1964), patriarch from 1917 to 1964 in Iraq
- Abdullah bar Sam (died 1981), patriarch from 1964 to 1981 in Baghdad
- Abdullah bar Negm (died 2009; son of Negm bar Zahroon), patriarch from 1981 to 1999 in Baghdad; he emigrated to the United Kingdom in 2000
- Sattar Jabbar Hilow (born 1956), the current Mandaean patriarch in Baghdad since 2000

Iran

- Jabbar Choheili (1923–2014), rishama in Ahvaz

Australia

- Salah Choheili (born 1952), an Iranian-Australian priest who has been a rishama in Sydney since 2010
- Brikha Nasoraia (born 1964), an Iraqi-Australian priest who has been a rishama in Sydney since 2024
Incumbent rishamas

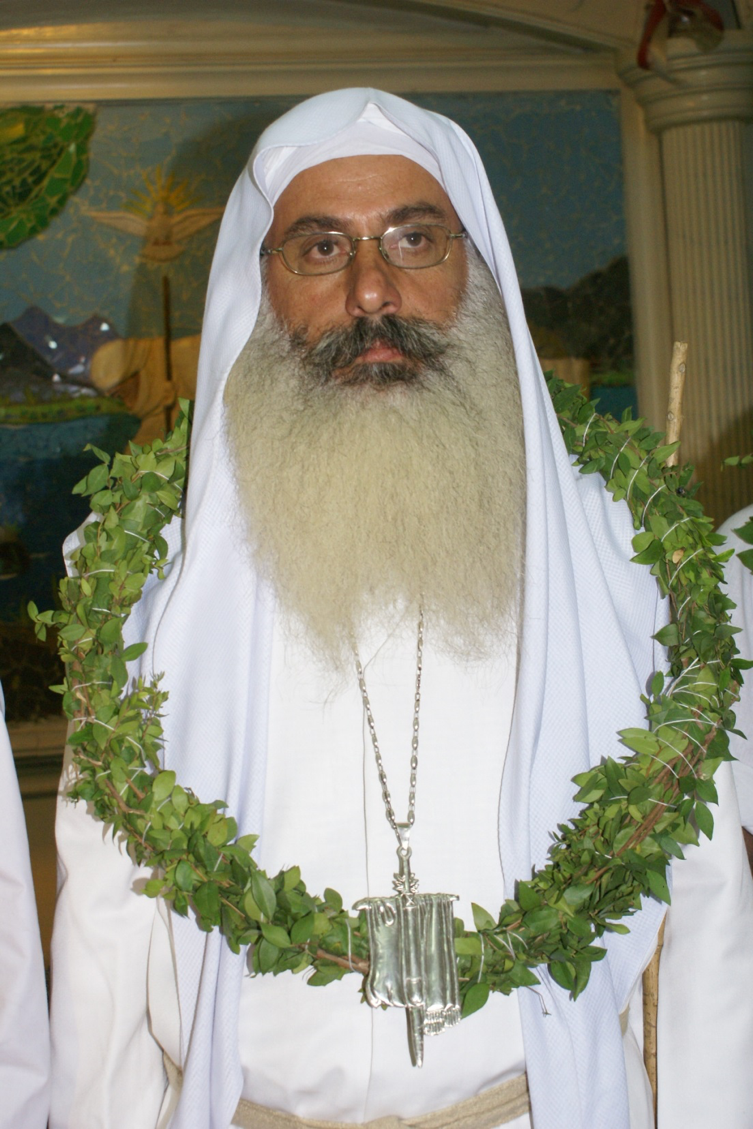
Rishama Sattar Jabbar Hilow (Iraq)

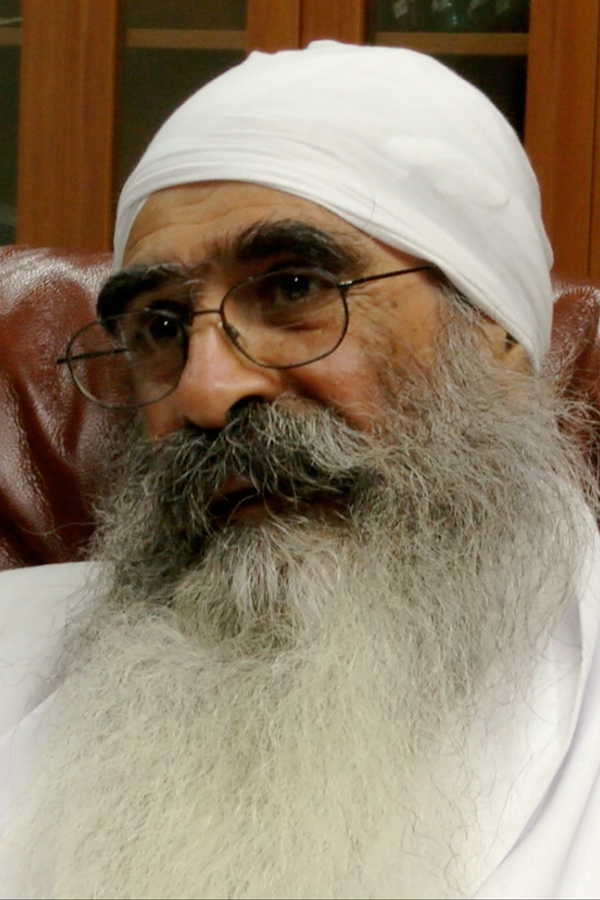
Rishama Salah Choheili (Australia)

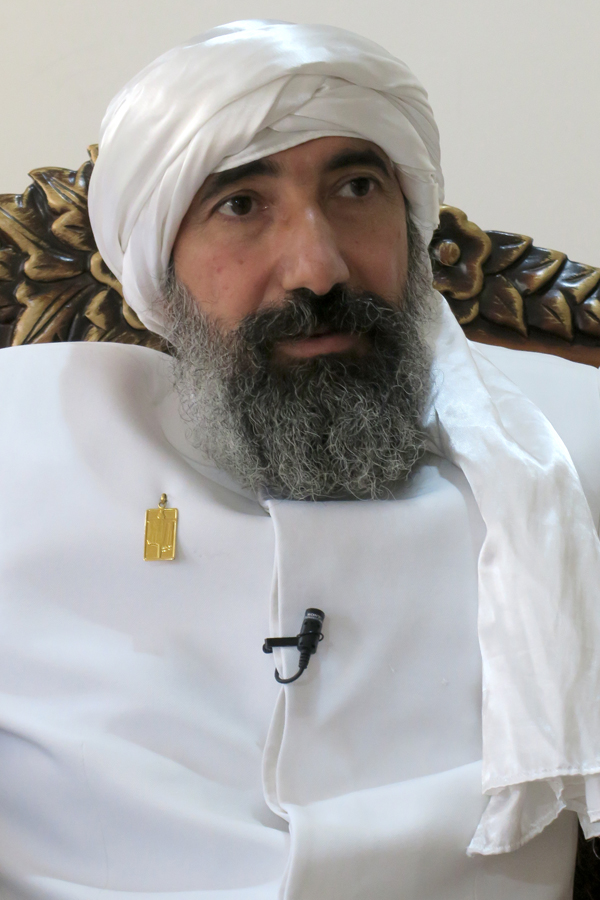
Rishama Brikha Nasoraia (Australia)

== See also ==
- Chief Rabbi
- Kohanim
- Nasoraeans
- Samaritan High Priest
- Archbishop
- Ethnarch
- List of Mandaean priests
- Ganzibra
- Tarmida
