= Shlama beth Qidra =

3rd-century female Mandaean priest and scribe

Shlama beth Qidra Šlama pt Qidra
- ࡔࡋࡀࡌࡀ ࡐࡕ ࡒࡉࡃࡓࡀ

Personal life
- Born: 2nd century AD?
- Died: 3rd century AD?
- Known for: The earliest known copyist of Mandaean texts (Left Ginza, etc.)
- Occupation: Mandaean priest

Religious life
- Religion: Mandaeism

Shlama beth Qidra (Šlama, daughter of Qidra, Classical Mandaic: ࡔࡋࡀࡌࡀ ࡐࡕ ࡒࡉࡃࡓࡀ, romanized: Šlama pt Qidra), also known as Shalma beth Qidra, was a female Mandaean priest and scribe who was active around 200 AD. Her name is found in the colophons of Left Ginza manuscripts, which do not bear the name of Zazai of Gawazta.

Shlama beth Qidra is the earliest Mandaean scribe named in Mandaean colophons, predating Zazai of Gawazta (fl. 270 AD) by a few generations.

== See also ==
- List of Mandaean priests
- Zazai of Gawazta
- Anush bar Danqa
