= Anush bar Danqa =

7th-century Mandaean priest, scribe, and leader

Rishama Anush bar Danqa
- ࡀࡍࡅࡔ ࡁࡓ ࡃࡀࡍࡒࡀ

Personal life
- Born: early 7th century AD?
- Died: late 7th century AD?
- Known for: Copying Mandaean texts; leading the first Mandaean delegation to the Muslims
- Other names: Anuš br Danqa; Anush, son of Danqa
- Occupation: Mandaean priest

Religious life
- Religion: Mandaeism

Anush bar Danqa (Classical Mandaic: ࡀࡍࡅࡔ ࡁࡓ ࡃࡀࡍࡒࡀ, romanized: Anuš br Danqa, lit. 'Anuš, son of Danqa') was a 7th-century Mandaean priest who was active around the Muslim conquest of Persia. According to Mandaean tradition, he led a delegation of Mandaeans to the Muslim authorities in Basra in the year 650/651 CE. Some scholars have characterized this incident as an effort to have the Mandaeans recognized as a People of the Book, even though the text does not lend itself to this interpretation, as it "describes an alliance brokered by an emissary from the worlds of light sometime during the final years of the Sasanian Empire (ca. 650/651 CE) between Mandaeans and Muslims, rather than the submission of the former to the latter."

Anush bar Danqa is mentioned in the text of the Haran Gawaita, as well as appearing as one of the earliest copyists in the colophons of many Mandaean texts.

== See also ==
- Zazai of Gawazta
- Anush (Mandaeism)
