= Mandaean priest =

Ordained religious leader in Mandaeism

A Mandaean priest refers to an ordained religious leader in Mandaeism. The three ranks of Mandaean priests are the tarmida (junior priest), ganzibra (senior priest), and rishama (patriarch).

== Overview ==
All priests must undergo lengthy ordination ceremonies, beginning with tarmida initiation. Mandaean religious leaders and copyists of religious texts hold the title Rabbi or Rabbai (Classical Mandaic: ࡓࡁࡀࡉ, romanized: rbai), or in Arabic, Sheikh. In Iran, they are also occasionally referred to as Mullah.

All Mandaean communities traditionally require the presence of a priest, since priests are required to officiate over all important religious rituals, including masbuta, masiqta, birth and wedding ceremonies. Priests also serve as teachers, scribes, and community leaders. Many Mandaean diaspora communities do not have easy access to priests. Due to the shortage of priests in the Mandaean diaspora, halala (Classical Mandaic: ࡄࡀࡋࡀࡋࡀ) or learned Mandaean laymen who are ritually clean (both individually and in terms of family background) can sometimes assume minor roles typically assumed by ordained priests. Such laymen taking on limited priestly roles are called paisaq (Classical Mandaic: ࡐࡀࡉࡎࡀࡒ). Ritually clean laymen who are literate in Mandaic and can read Mandaean scriptures are known as yalufa (Classical Mandaic: ࡉࡀࡋࡅࡐࡀ, romanized: ialupa).

== Names ==
In Mandaean scriptures, priests are referred to as Naṣuraiia (Classical Mandaic: ࡍࡀࡑࡅࡓࡀࡉࡉࡀ, lit. 'Naṣoraeans') or occasionally as Tarmiduta (Classical Mandaic: ࡕࡀࡓࡌࡉࡃࡅࡕࡀ, an abstract noun derived from tarmida). On the other hand, laypeople are referred to as Mandaiia (Classical Mandaic: ࡌࡀࡍࡃࡀࡉࡉࡀ, lit. 'Gnostics, Knowers, Enlightened Ones'). Naṣuraiia are considered to have naṣiruta, or esoteric divine knowledge. (Brikha Nasoraia describes naṣiruta as the esoteric strand of Mandaeism, similar to how Sufism is related to Islam.)

== Priests ==
There are three types of priests in Mandaeism:

- rišama (Classical Mandaic: ࡓࡉࡔࡀࡌࡀ; Modern Mandaic: rišammā) "leader of the people"
- ganzibria (Classical Mandaic: ࡂࡀࡍࡆࡉࡁࡓࡉࡀ) "treasurers" (from Old Persian ganza-bara "treasurers", Neo-Mandaic ganzeḇrānā)
- tarmidia (Classical Mandaic: ࡕࡀࡓࡌࡉࡃࡉࡀ) "disciples" (Neo-Mandaic tarmidānā)

Priests have lineages based on the succession of ganzibria priests who had initiated them. Priestly lineages, which are distinct from birth lineages, are typically recorded in the colophons of many Mandaean texts. The position is not hereditary, and any yalufa (yalupa), or Mandaean male who is highly knowledgeable about religious matters, is eligible to become a priest.

Traditionally, any ganzeḇrā who baptizes seven or more ganzeḇrānā may qualify for the office of rišama. The current rišama of the Mandaean community in Iraq is Sattar Jabbar Hilow al-Zahrony. In Australia, the rišama of the Mandaean community is Salah Choheili.

A shganda (šganda) or ashganda (ašganda) is a ritual assistant who helps priests with ritual duties. Prior to ordination, many priests have typically served as shganda as young men, although this is not a requirement.

== History ==
Zazai of Gawazta, who was active during the 270s AD during the reign of Sasanian Emperor Bahram I, is widely considered to be one of the first Mandaean priests. During the Muslim conquests of the 630s, the Mandaean priest Anush bar Danqa, led a delegation before the Muslim authorities to have the Mandaeans recognized as a People of the Book.

The contemporary Mandaean priesthood can trace its immediate origins to the first half of the 19th century. In 1831, a cholera pandemic in Shushtar, Iran devastated the region and eliminated all of the Mandaean religious leaders there. Two of the surviving acolytes (šgandia), Yahia Bihram and Ram Zihrun, reestablished the Mandaean priesthood in Suq esh-Shuyuk on the basis of their own training and the texts that were available to them.

Although Mandaean priests have been exclusively male since the 1900s, Buckley (2010) presents evidence that there had historically been Mandaean priests who were women, including Bibia Mudalal (the wife of Ram Zihrun during the 19th century) and Shlama beth Qidra (Šlama, daughter of Qidra, from the 3rd century AD).

== Clothing ==
Ritual clothing and accessories worn by Mandaean priests include:

- Burzinqa: turban
- Pandama: cloth wrapped around the mouth and lower face (similar to the Tuareg litham)
- Naṣifa: stole
- Kanzala or kinzala: stole, when held under the chin
- Himiana: sacred ritual girdle (belt) used by priests
- Margna: wooden staff made from an olive branch
- Skandola: ritual iron ring with an iron chain that is used as a sacred seal. It is used to seal graves and also newborn babies on their navels.
- Gdada: strip of white cloth used to protect items from pollution, or the server from contact

Mandaean priests are dressed completely in white to symbolize radiant uthras from the World of Light.

== Alms ==
Mandaean priests regularly receive zidqa (alms) from laypeople, since priesthood is typically a full-time occupation.

== Symbolism ==
Symbolically, a Mandaean priest represents an uthra on earth (Tibil).

Shishlam is the personification of the prototypical or archetypal Mandaean priest.

== Statistics ==
As of 2016, Rishama Salah Choheili estimated a total number of 43–44 Mandaean priests in the world, including tarmidas, ganzibras, and rishamas.

- Australia — 13, including Rishama Salah Choheili, Rishama Brikha Nasoraia, Ganzibra Khaldoon Majid Abdullah, Tarmida Sahi Bashikh, Tarmida Yuhana Nashmi, and Tarmida Thamir Shamkhi
- Iraq — 12, led by Rishama Sattar Jabbar Hilo
- Iran — 6, including Ganzibra Najah Choheili, Ganzibra Taleb Doraji, and Tarmida Behram Khafajy
- Jordan — 2
- Turkey — 1
- United States — 3, including Ganzibra Walid Ebadfardzadeh and Fawzi Masboob (died 2022)
- Netherlands — 2, including Tarmida Rafid al-Sabti
- Denmark — 1
- Sweden — Ganzibra Salwan Alkhamas and others

There are a few Mandaean priests in Sweden, including Ganzibra Salwan Alkhamas of Södertälje and Tarmida Qais Edan of Malmö. Buckley (2023) reported that in 2015, there were 8 Mandaean priests in Sweden.

In 2016, Salah Choheili also estimated a total number of 16 shgandas in the world who could potentially become tarmidas, 4 of whom were in Australia.

During the 2000s, Rishama Abdullah Ganzibra Najam (d. 2009) was one of the few high-ranking Mandaean priests in Europe.

== See also ==
- List of Mandaean priests
- Choheili family
- Khaffagi family
- Shishlam, a literary representation of the prototypical Mandaean priest
- Kohanim, priests in Judaism
- Ašipu, a priest in ancient Mesopotamia
