= Ganzibra =

Senior priest in Mandaeism

A ganzibra (singular form in Classical Mandaic: ࡂࡀࡍࡆࡉࡁࡓࡀ, Modern Mandaic pronunciation: ganzewrā; plural form in Classical Mandaic: ࡂࡀࡍࡆࡉࡁࡓࡉࡀ ganzibria, literally 'treasurer' in Mandaic; Persian: گنزورا) is a high priest in Mandaeism. Tarmidas, or junior priests, rank below the ganzibras.

Symbolically, ganzibras are considered to be uthras on earth (Tibil). Their responsibilities include performing masbuta, masiqta, wedding ceremonies, and other rituals, all of which can only be performed by priests. They must prepare their own food to maintain ritual purity. Ganzibra priests are also prohibited from consuming stimulants such as wine, tobacco, and coffee.

== Ordination ==
The ganzibras go through an elaborate set of initiation rituals that are separate from those performed for the tarmidas. According to Drower (1937), a ganzibra can only be initiated immediately before the death of a pious member of the Mandaean community. Two ganzibras and two shgandas are required to perform the initiation.

The bukra is the first masiqta performed by a ganzibra priest just after ordination.

The ʿngirta (lit. 'message'; also refers to Qulasta prayers 73–74) is a ceremony used to inform the World of Light about the ordination of a ganzibra.

A ganzibra qualifies to become a rishama after he initiates five priests.

== In Mandaean texts ==
In Right Ginza 15.7, 15.8, 16.1, and 17.1, the uthra Yura is mentioned as Yura Rba Ganzibra, or "Great Yura the Ganzibra."

== Notable ganzibria ==
Notable ganzibria include:

- Khaldoon Majid Abdullah (Australia)
- Salwan Alkhamas (Sweden)
- Najah Choheili (Iran)
- Taleb Doraji (Iran)
- Negm bar Zahroon (1892–1976, lived in both Iraq and Iran)

== See also ==
- Mandaean priest
- Bishop
- Grand Mufti
- Kohanim
- Rishama
- Tarmida
