= Tarmida =

Minor priest in Mandaeism

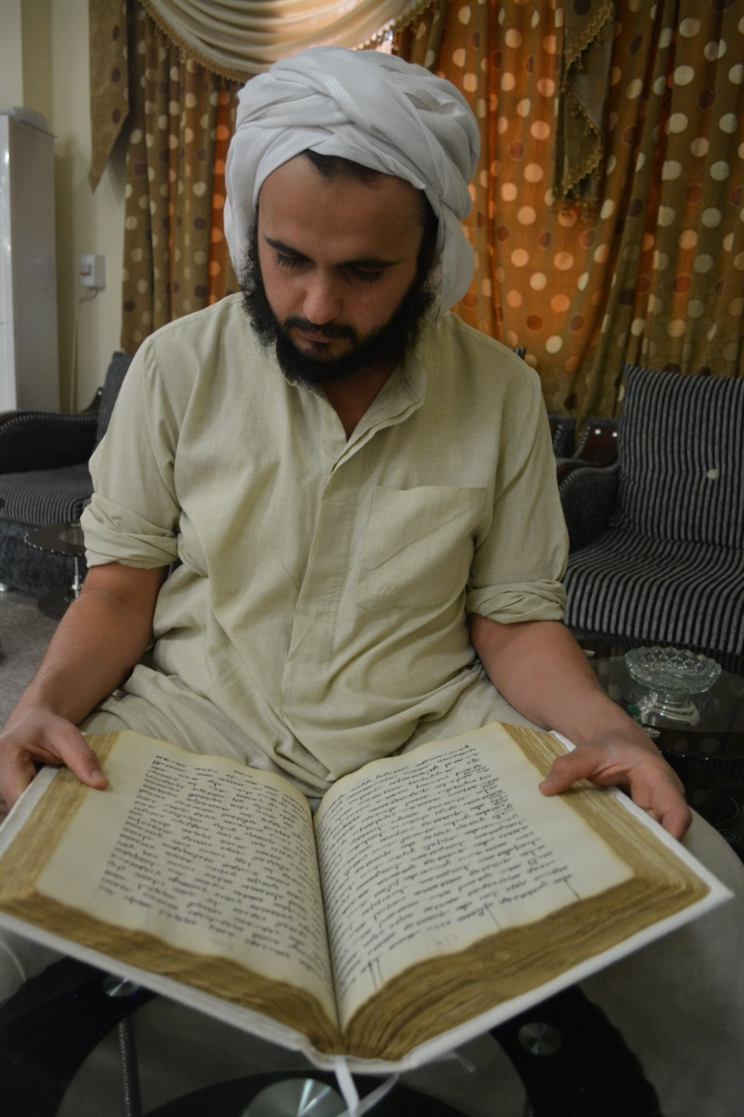
A tarmida reading a Mandaean manuscript codex in Nasiriyah, Iraq in 2015

A tarmida (singular form in Classical Mandaic: ࡕࡀࡓࡌࡉࡃࡀ, lit. 'disciple', plural form in Classical Mandaic: ࡕࡀࡓࡌࡉࡃࡉࡀ tarmidia; Persian: ترمیدا; Arabic: ترميذة; Modern Mandaic pronunciation: [tʰarˈmida]) is a junior priest in Mandaeism. Ganzibras, or head priests, rank above tarmidas.

== Etymology ==
Häberl (2022) considers the Mandaic word tarmida to be a borrowing from Hebrew talmid (Hebrew: תַלמִיד).

== Ordination ==
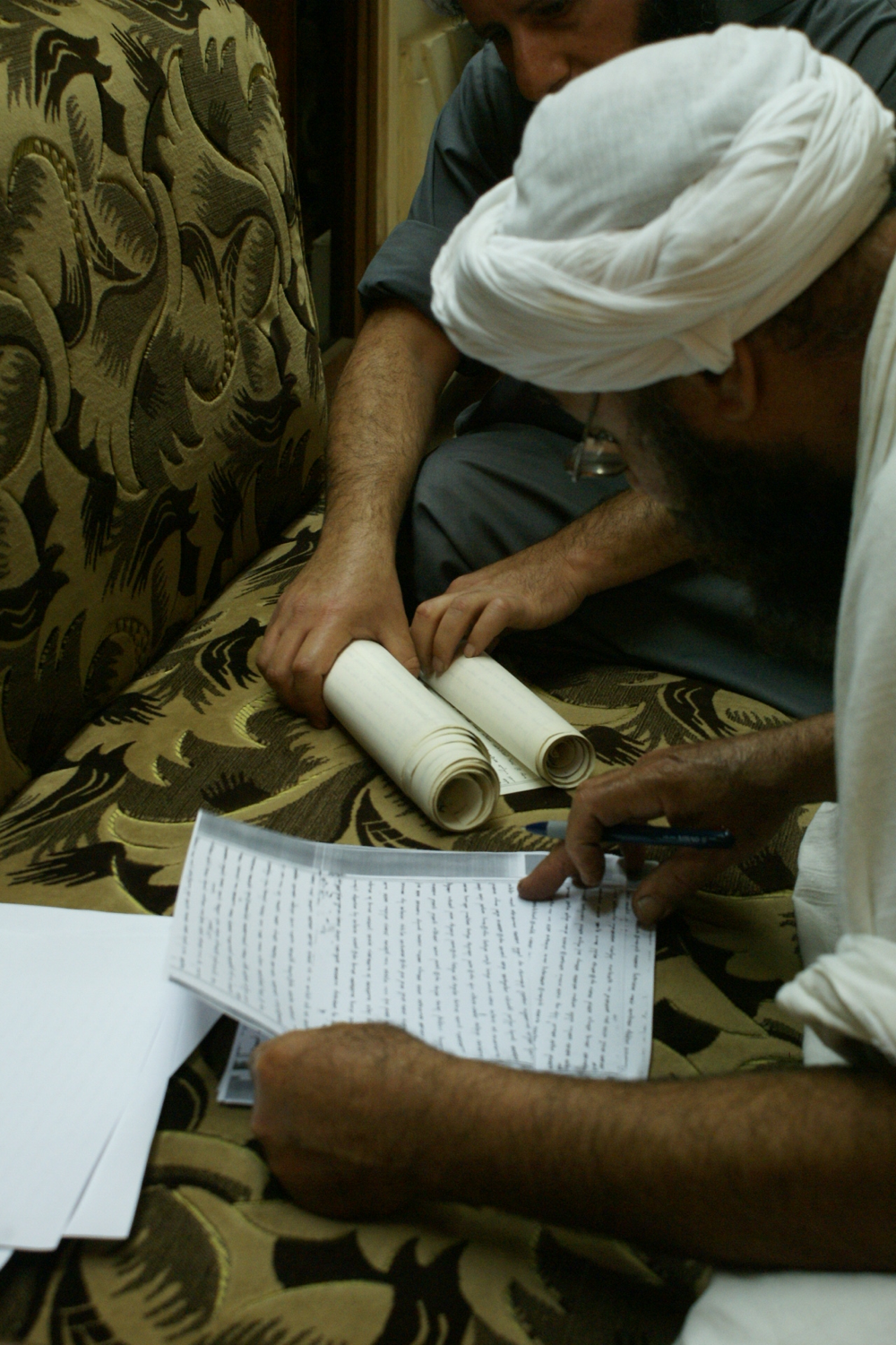
The Coronation of the Great Shishlam being read inside a tarmida initiation hut in Baghdad, Iraq in 2008

Tarmida initiates or novices (ࡔࡅࡀࡋࡉࡀ šualia) can come from any "pure" family. In other words, the families must be ritually pure, meaning that there are no family members who have committed grave sins. Ritually pure laymen are also known as hallali in Mandaic. Typically, the novices have been trained as ritual assistants (šganda or ašganda) when they were children. Initiates may or may not be married, although typically they are not yet married.

In order to be ordained as a tarmida, the initiate (ࡔࡅࡀࡋࡉࡀ šualia) must go through a complex series of initiation rituals lasting 68 days. Various rituals are performed by the initiator priest (ࡓࡁࡀ rba), who recites from priestly esoteric texts such as The Coronation of the Great Shishlam (Šarh d-Traṣa d-Taga d-Šišlam Rabbā), the Scroll of Exalted Kingship (Diwan Malkuta ʿLaita), The Great Supreme World (Alma Rišaia Rba), and the Qulasta. Ritual helpers (šganda or ࡔࡂࡀࡍࡃࡀ ašganda), who represent emissaries from the World of Light, also help perform the rituals, many of which are held in a specially constructed priest initiation hut (škinta) and also a nearby temporary reed hut (andiruna).

=== Stages ===
- For the first 7 of the 68 days, both the novice and the initiator stay in the škinta without sleeping. This period is concluded by the novice baptizing the initiator.
- Next, the novice goes through 60 days of seclusion, maintains his ritual purity, and cooks his own food. Only the šganda, who visits everyday to exchange kušṭa, is allowed to come in contact with the novice. 180 rahmas (devotional prayers) are recited during these 60 days, with 60 prayers each meant for the soul, spirit, and body (hence 3 sets of 60) as the Coronation text explains.
- After the 60 days of seclusion are over, additional rituals are performed with priests, including a zidqa brikha (blessed oblation; Classical Mandaic: ࡆࡉࡃࡒࡀ ࡁࡓࡉࡊࡀ) ritual meal.
- Finally, the novice baptizes his initiator again, and the 68-day ordination ceremony is complete.

=== Prayer sequence ===
Below is the sequence of Qulasta prayer numbers for the tarmida initiation according to both the Coronation and Exalted Kingship. Exalted Kingship contains more detailed descriptions of the rituals, while the Coronation is shorter. During the prayers, pihta ࡐࡉࡄࡕࡀ (sacramental bread) and mambuha ࡌࡀࡌࡁࡅࡄࡀ (sacramental water) are also consumed. Ritual handclasps (kušṭa) are often exchanged between the novice and the initiator, and sometimes also with the ritual assistant (šganda). Various names of the deceased (zhara ࡆࡄࡀࡓࡀ) are also uttered along with the prayers.

==== Initiation begins ====
Coronation	Exalted Kingship
323	323
1–103 (novice’s recital in škinta)	1–103
324–327 (coronation prayers)	324–327
3, 5, 19	3, 5, 19
79, 81	79, 80, 81

==== Preparation for baptizing novice ====
Coronation	Exalted Kingship
1, 3, 5, 19	1, 3, 5, 19
32	32
8, 34 (incense prayers)	8, 34
75–77	75–77
35 (with zharas)	35

==== Baptism of novice begins ====
Coronation	Exalted Kingship
	10–13
	18
	414
	19
	1st kušṭa
	82
	20–24
	2nd kušṭa
	36–45 (pihta and mambuha)
	3rd kušṭa
	25–28 (sealing prayers)
	29, 30, 83–86, 88, 90
	71–72 (1st concurrence)
	4th kušṭa
	18, 109 (rahmas [devotions])
58 (with zhara)	58
65	65
168–169	168–169
71–72	71–72 (2nd concurrence)
	36–45 (pihta and mambuha)
59–60	59–60
31, 8	31, 8
72	72
	171
mqaimitun ["be raised up!"] (repeated 61 times)	mqaimitun ["be raised up!"]
80	80
kušṭa with šganda	5th kušṭa
63 (masiqta oil)	63
178	178
1, 3, 9, 15	
344–345	
233–256 (kḏ azil)	233–256
330–347 (drabša prayers)	

The Coronation contains 3 sets of prayers during the final part of the ritual that are not listed in Exalted Kingship.

==== Novice crowned ====
Coronation	Exalted Kingship
1, 3, 5, 19	1, 3, 5, 19
35, 9	35, 9
15–17	15–17
25–28 (haṭamtas [sealing prayers])	25–28

==== Hamra ceremony ====
Coronation	Exalted Kingship
180–199	180–199
305–321 (antiphons)	305–321

==== Cult hut (škinta) period begins ====
Coronation	Exalted Kingship
	72, 31, 8, 94, 63, kḏ azil
106–108	106–108
1, 3, 5, 19	1, 3, 5, 19
8, 34	8
	165–169
113 (a Sunday prayer)	113
114–117	114–116
77, 9, 35	77, 9, 35
15–17	15–17
25–28	25–28
58, 65	58, 65
119–122	
165–169	165
71–72	71–72 (3rd concurrence)
36–45	36–45
59–60	59–60
72	72
	171
80	80
kušṭa	kušṭa

Prayers 34 and 119–122 (first 4 Sunday rahma prayers) are included in the Coronation, but not Exalted Kingship.

=== Gallery ===
The gallery below contains images of a tarmida initiation held in Baghdad in 2008.

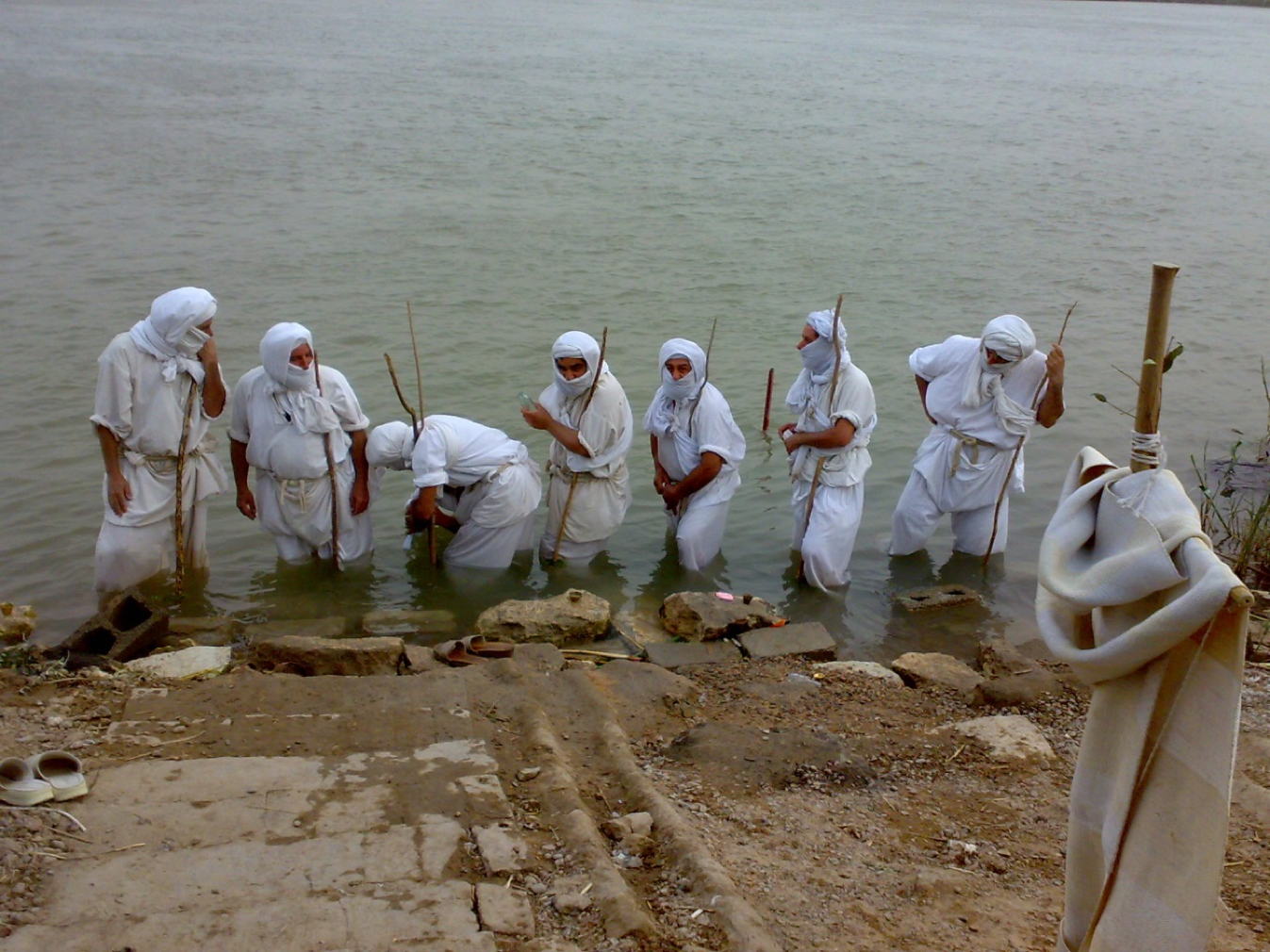
Seven priests begin the initiation by baptizing each other, and then the initiate.

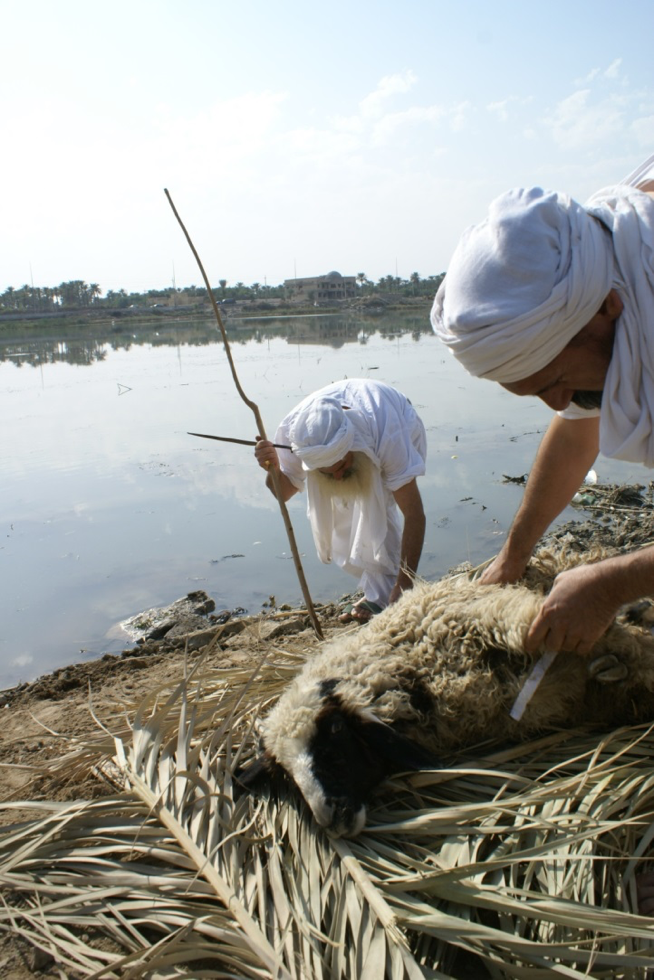
A ram is sacrificed for the initiation ceremony.

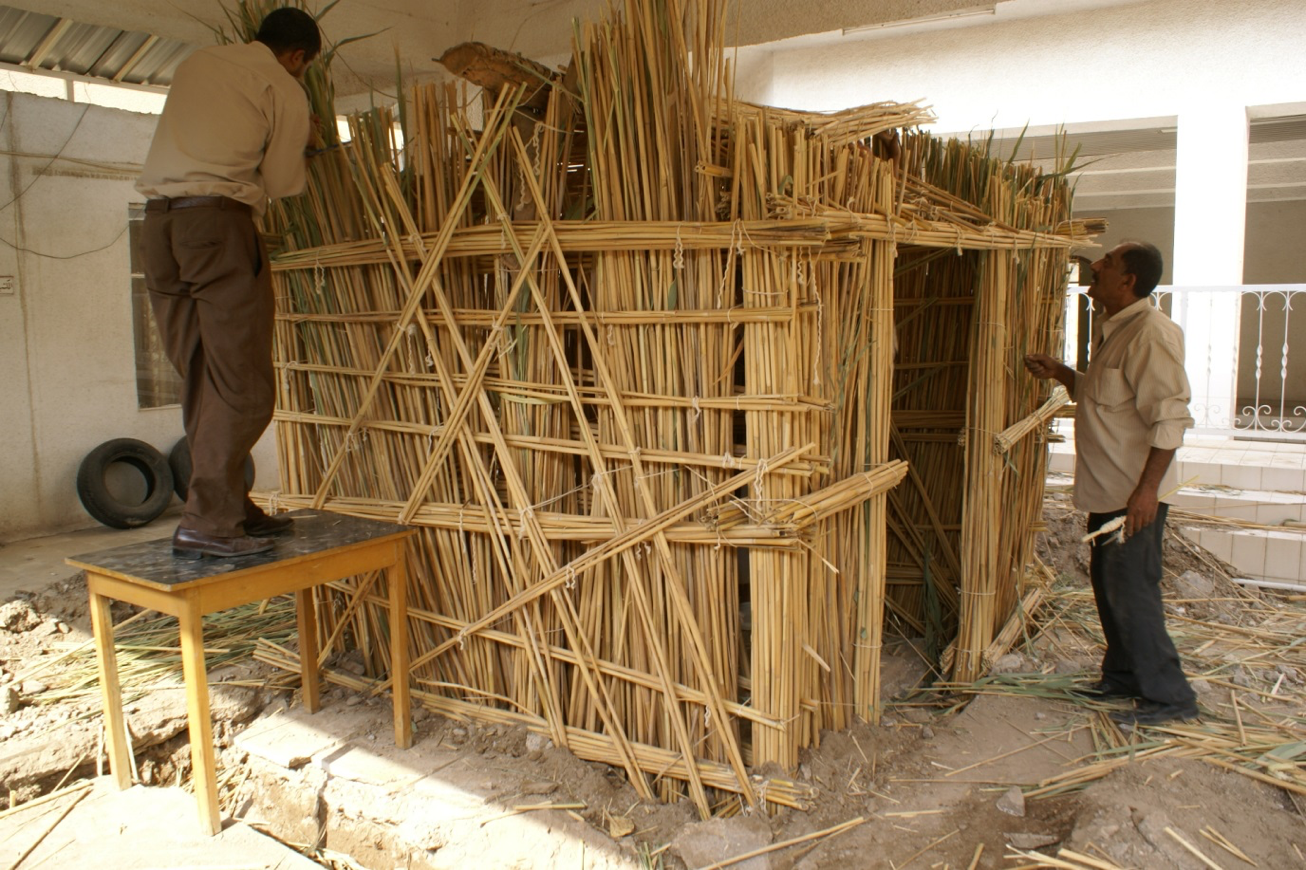
A shkinta being built

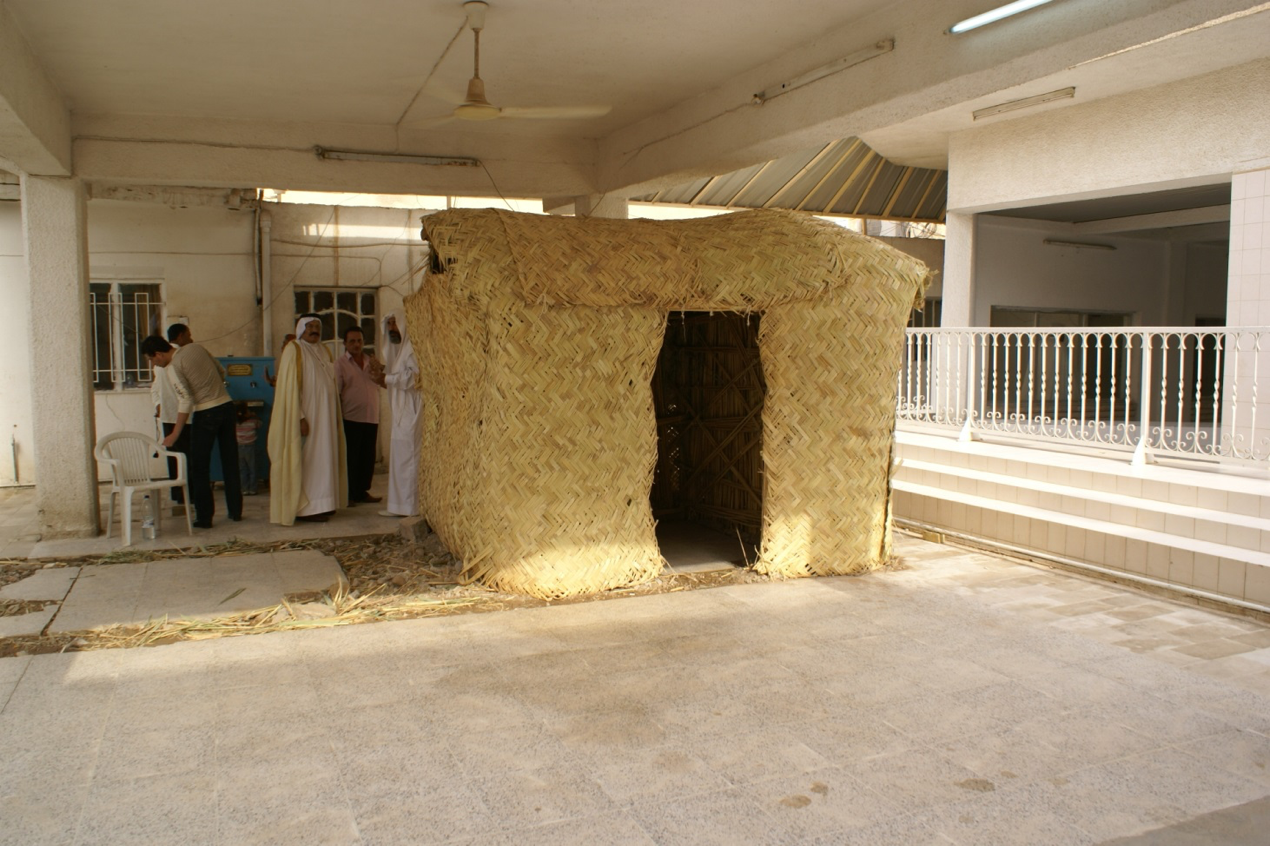
The completed shkinta

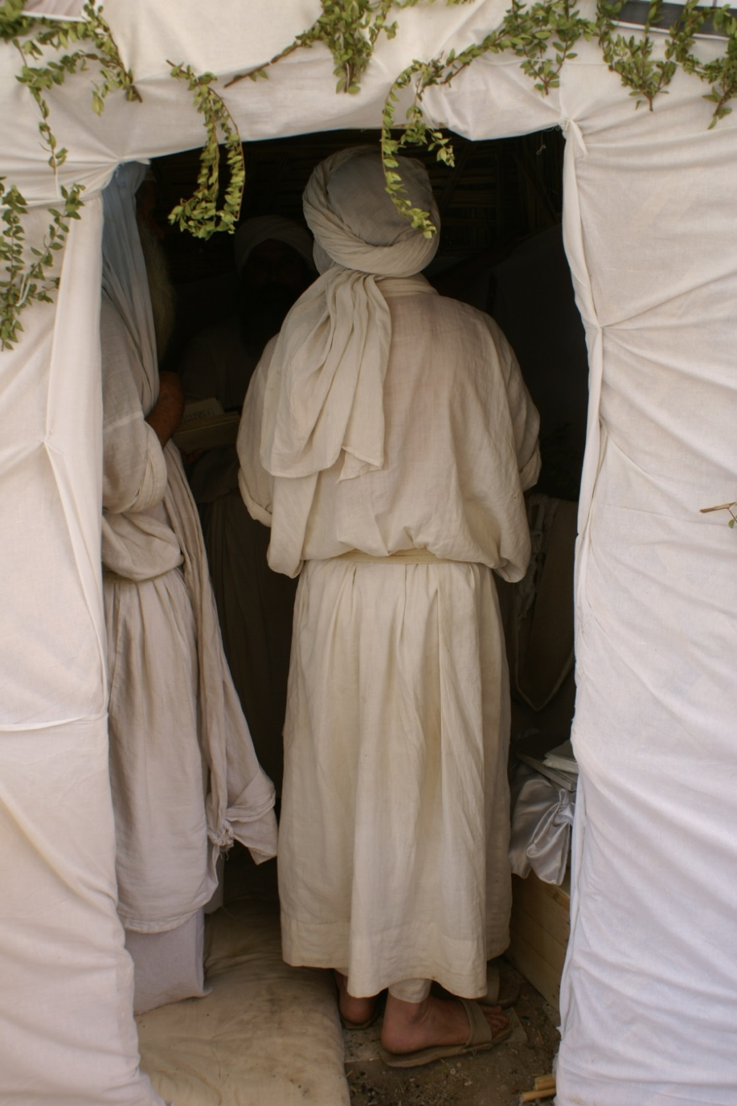
An initiate in the andiruna

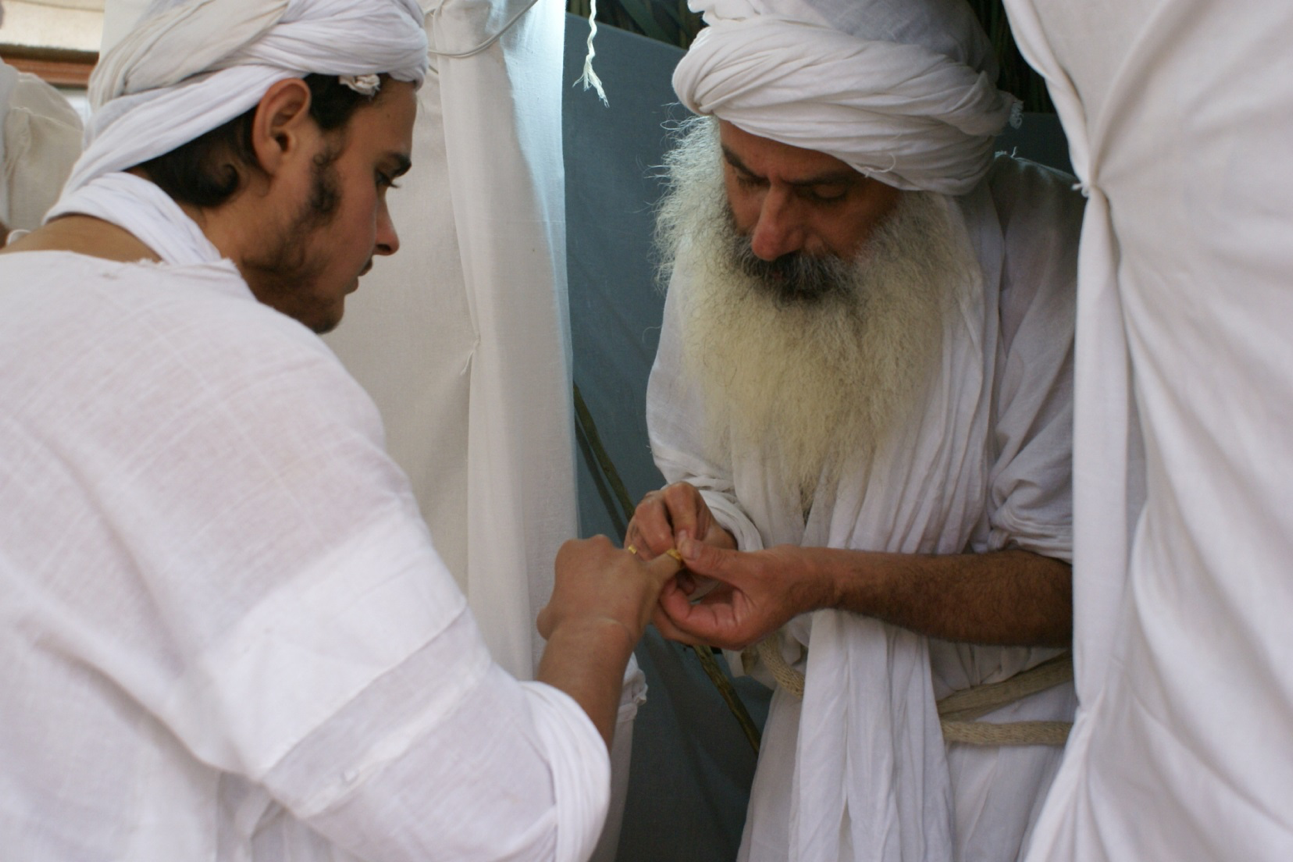
An initiate receiving a sacred gold ring called Shom Yawar Ziwa

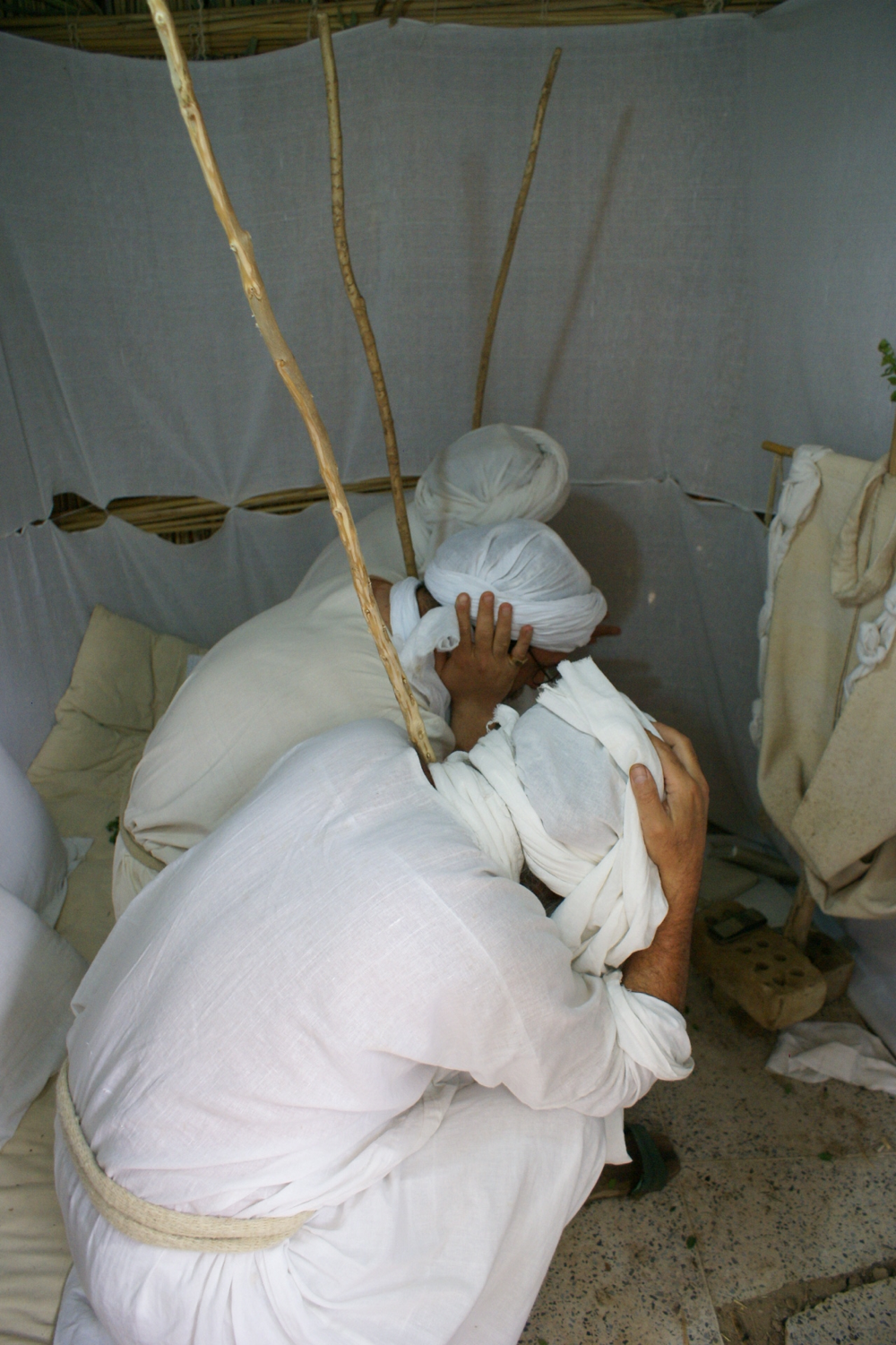
Priests praying the Baii Rahmi (the Great Prayer)

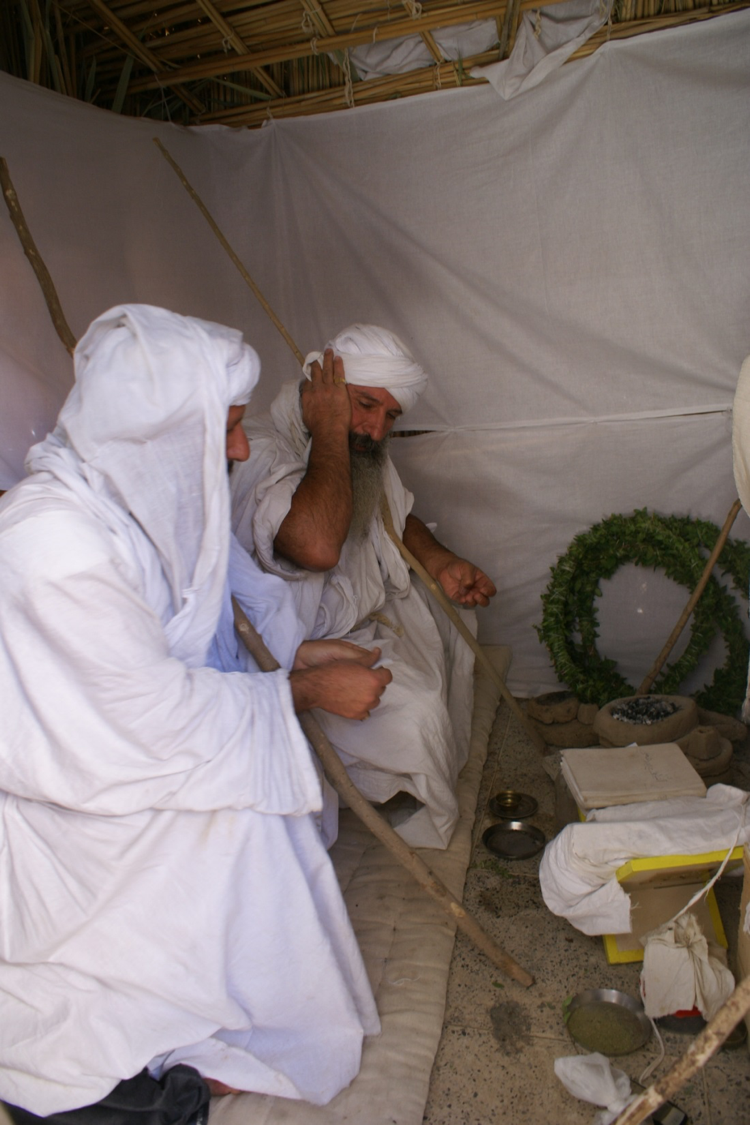
Priests reading the Baii Rahmi (the Great Prayer)

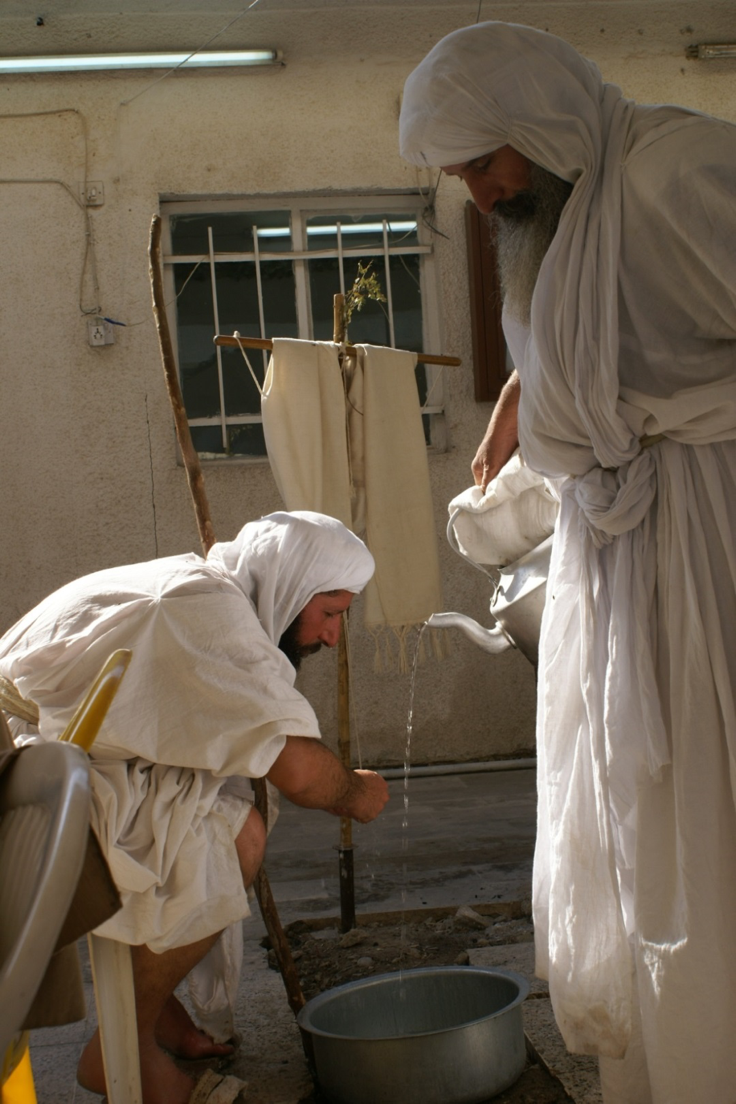
An initiate performing rishama (ablution) in order to start the lengthy prayer Baii Rahmi (Great Prayer), with the drabsha assembled in the background

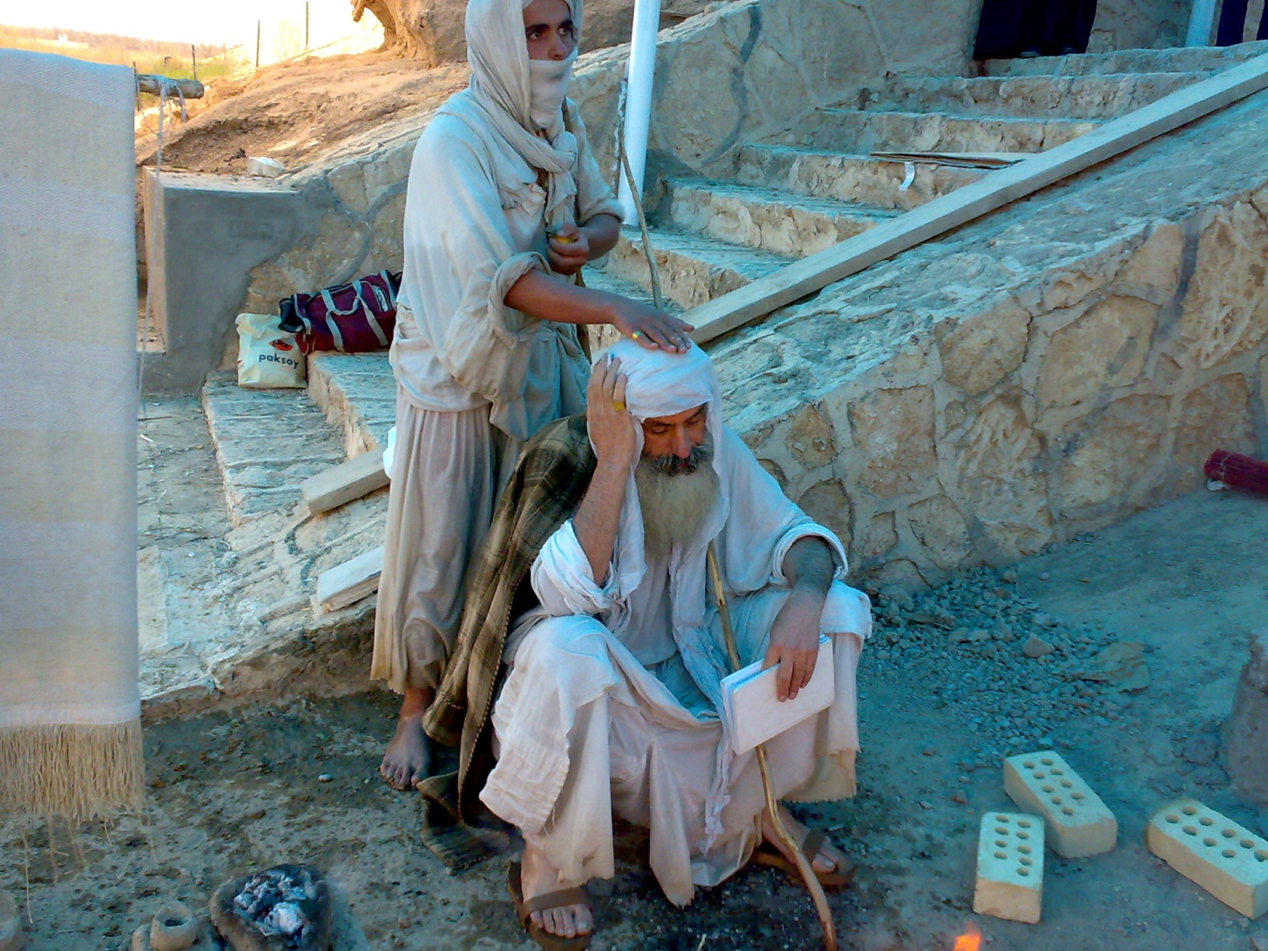
An initiate baptizing his initiator

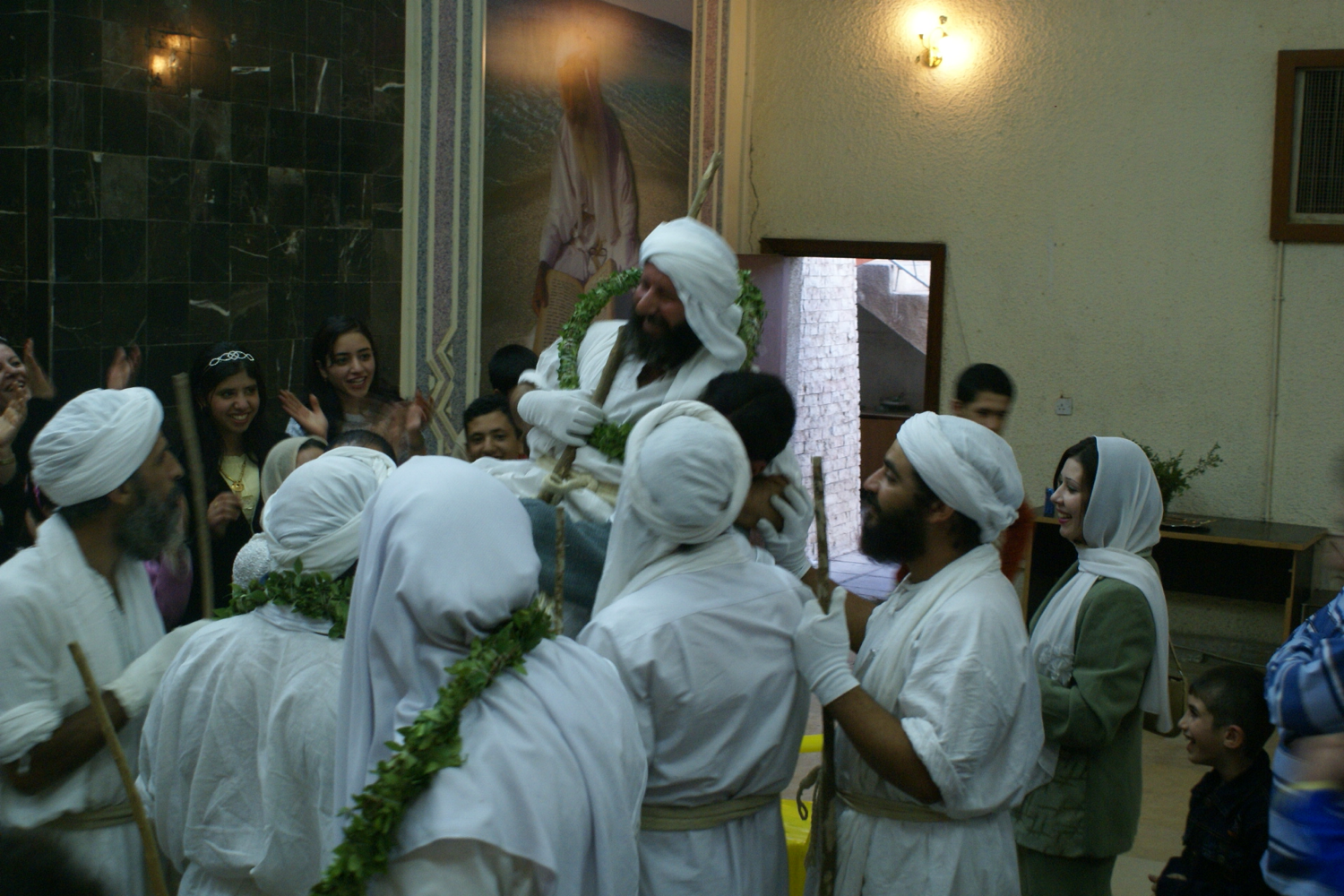
Celebrating the newly ordained tarmidia in Baghdad in 2008

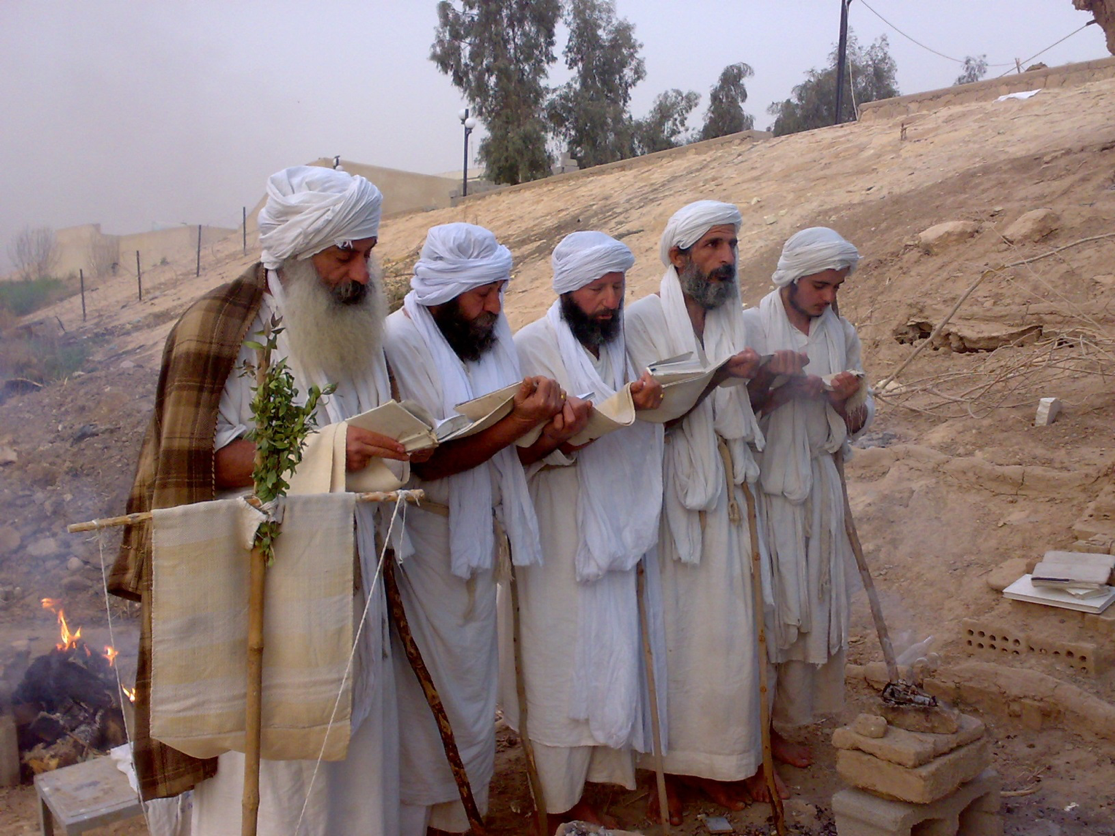
Newly ordained tarmidia in Baghdad in 2008

== See also ==
- Mandaean priest
- List of Mandaean priests
- Rishama
- Ganzibra
