= Shah-Ali Bridge =

Complex irrigation system from the Sassanid era, island city Shushtar, Iran

Shushtar Historical Hydraulic System
UNESCO World Heritage Site
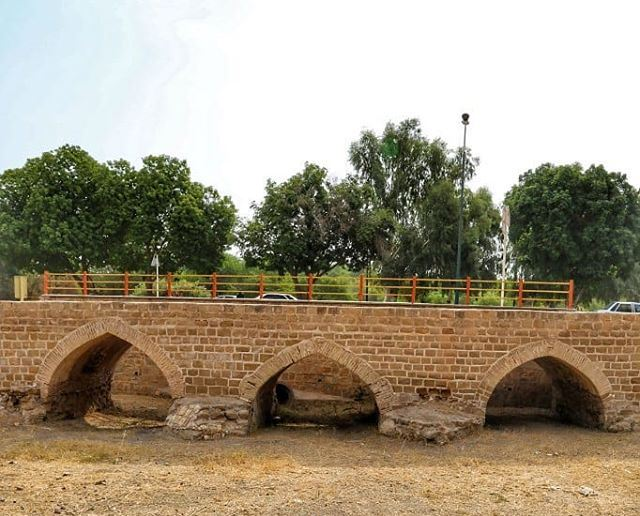

- Location within Iran
- Location: Shushtar County, Khuzestan Province, Iran
- Criteria: Cultural: (i), (ii), (v)
- Reference: 1315
- Inscription: 2009 (33rd Session)
- Area: 240.4 ha (594 acres)
- Buffer zone: 1,572.2 ha (3,885 acres)
- Coordinates: 32°1′10″N 48°50′5″E

Shah-Ali Bridge (Persian: پل شاه علی, romanized: Pol-e Shah Ali) is a world heritage site, a part of the Shushtar Historical Hydraulic System, located in the island city of Shushtar, Khouzestan Province, Iran, and dating back to the Safavid era. It was registered on UNESCO's list of World Heritage Sites in 2009 and is Iran's 10th cultural heritage site. It is a part of Shushtar Historical Hydraulic System, which includes 12 other historical bridges, dams, canals, watermills and buildings. The bridge is located close to Lashkar Bridge.
