= Sush =

Sush may refer to:

- Sush Machida Gaikotsu, Japanese artist
- Shush-e Olya, also known as Sūsh, a village in Iran
- nickname of Sushmita Sen, Indian actress and beauty pageant titleholder

== See also ==
- Shush (disambiguation)
- Sash (disambiguation)
- Sushi
