= Mizan Dam =

Complex irrigation system from the Sasanian era, island city Shushtar, Iran

Shushtar Historical Hydraulic System
UNESCO World Heritage Site
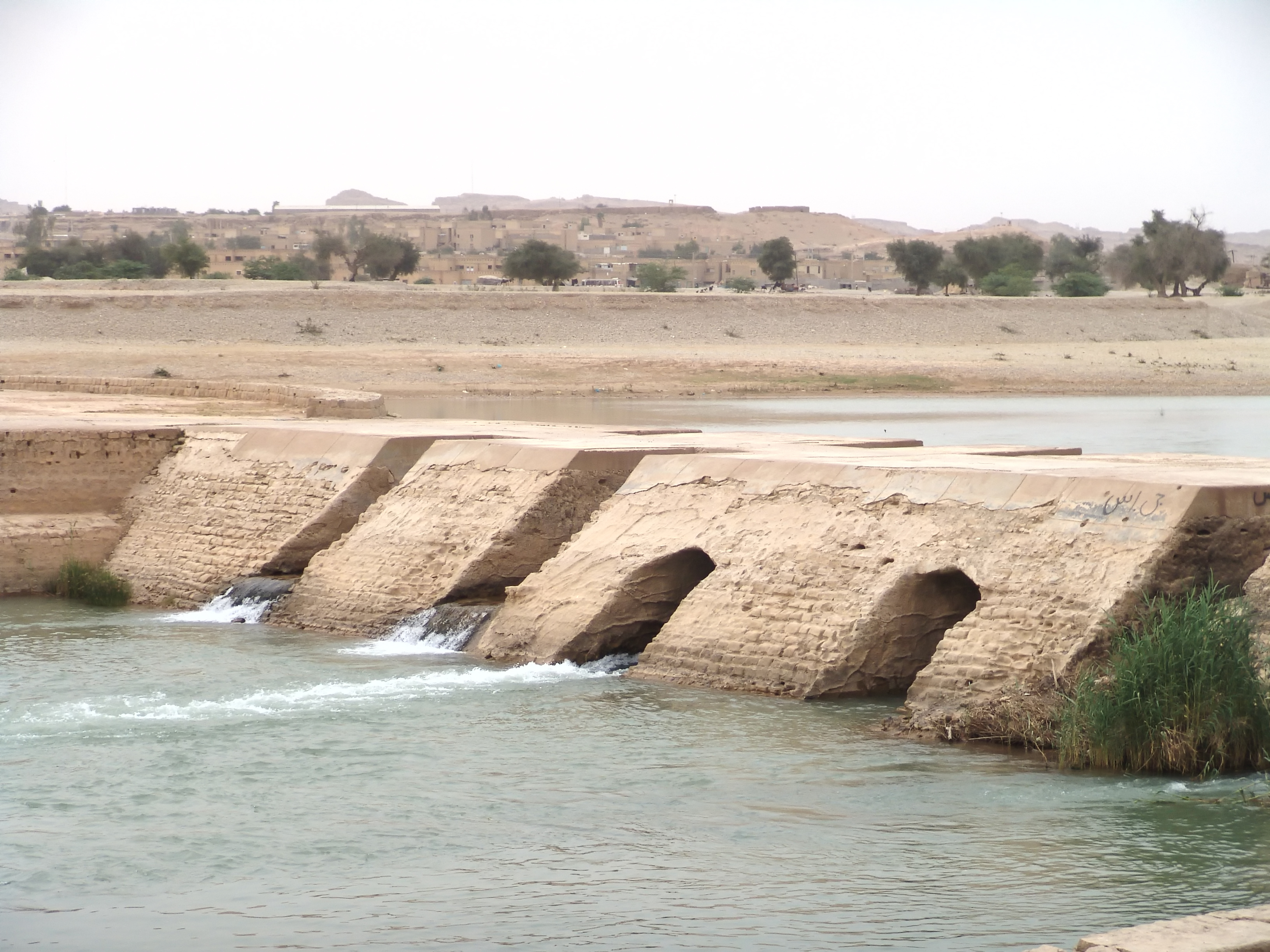

- Location within Iran
- Location: Shushtar County, Khuzestan Province, Iran
- Criteria: Cultural: (i), (ii), (v)
- Reference: 1315
- Inscription: 2009 (33rd Session)
- Area: 240.4 ha (594 acres)
- Buffer zone: 1,572.2 ha (3,885 acres)
- Coordinates: 32°3′1″N 48°51′6″E

Mizan Dam (Persian: بند میزان, romanized: Band-e Mizan) is a historic dam from the Sasanian era and a part of Shushtar Historical Hydraulic System, located in the island city of Shushtar, Khuzestan Province, Iran. Mizan Dam was registered on UNESCO's list of World Heritage Sites in 2009 and is Iran's 10th cultural heritage site to be registered on the United Nations' list together with the 12 other historical bridges, dams, canals, and buildings as Shushtar Historical Hydraulic System.

== History ==
As in its present form, it dates from the 3rd century CE, probably on older bases from the 5th century BC. The dam was built by Roman soldiers and engineers who were taken into captivity along with Emperor Valerian (r. 253–260 CE) after his defeat by Shapur I (r. 240–270 CE).

== Function ==
Mizan Dam is located upstream of a manmade canal called Gargar which was dug in order to divert water from the Karun River. The dam regulates water for Gargar (a tributary stream branched from the Karun) and this way, Mizan is considered a regulatory dam.

== Material ==
The elemental materials of this site are stone, Saruj mortar and sandstone in foundation that all of them have maintained their authenticity, and there aren't any interventions. But there are differences in some part of site due to different restoration periods.

== Threats ==
Due to the location and nature of Mizan Dam, this dam is sometimes submerged. Severe flooding has occurred during previous decades which affected the dam.
