= Gargar Bridge-Dam =

UNESCO World Heritage Site in Iran

Shushtar Historical Hydraulic System
UNESCO World Heritage Site
- Location within Iran
- Location: Shushtar County, Khuzestan Province, Iran
- Criteria: Cultural: (i), (ii), (v)
- Reference: 1315
- Inscription: 2009 (33rd Session)
- Area: 240.4 ha (594 acres)
- Buffer zone: 1,572.2 ha (3,885 acres)
- Coordinates: 32°2′7″N 48°51′5″E

Gargar Bridge-Dam (Persian: پل بند گرگر, romanized: Pol Band-e Gargar) is part of the Shushtar Historical Hydraulic System, located in the island city of Shushtar, Khuzestan province, Iran. It was registered on UNESCO's list of World Heritage Sites in 2009 and is Iran's 10th cultural heritage site to be registered on the United Nations' list, together with the 12 other historical bridges, dams, canals, and buildings which comprise the hydraulic system. The bridge-dam is built on the Gargar River, adjacent to the Shushtar watermills and waterfalls complex.
