= Shusht =

Shusht (Persian: شوشت) may refer to:

- Shusht-e Olya
- Shusht-e Sofla
