= Shush =

Shush may refer to:

- Shush, Iran, a city in Iran
- Shush-e Olya, a village in Iran
- Shush-e Sofla, a village in Iran
- Susa, which is Shush in Persian
- Shush County, Iran
- Istgah-e Shush, a village and railway station in Iran
- Shush Metro Station, a station on Tehran Metro Line 1
- S.H.U.S.H., the fictional peace-keeping organization
- Shush!, BBC radio sitcom
- "Shush", a song by Tori Amos from the 2026 album In Times of Dragons
- a request for silence

== See also ==
- Shushtar
