= Selasal Castle =

Complex irrigation system from the Sassanid era, island city Shushtar, Iran

Shushtar Historical Hydraulic System
UNESCO World Heritage Site
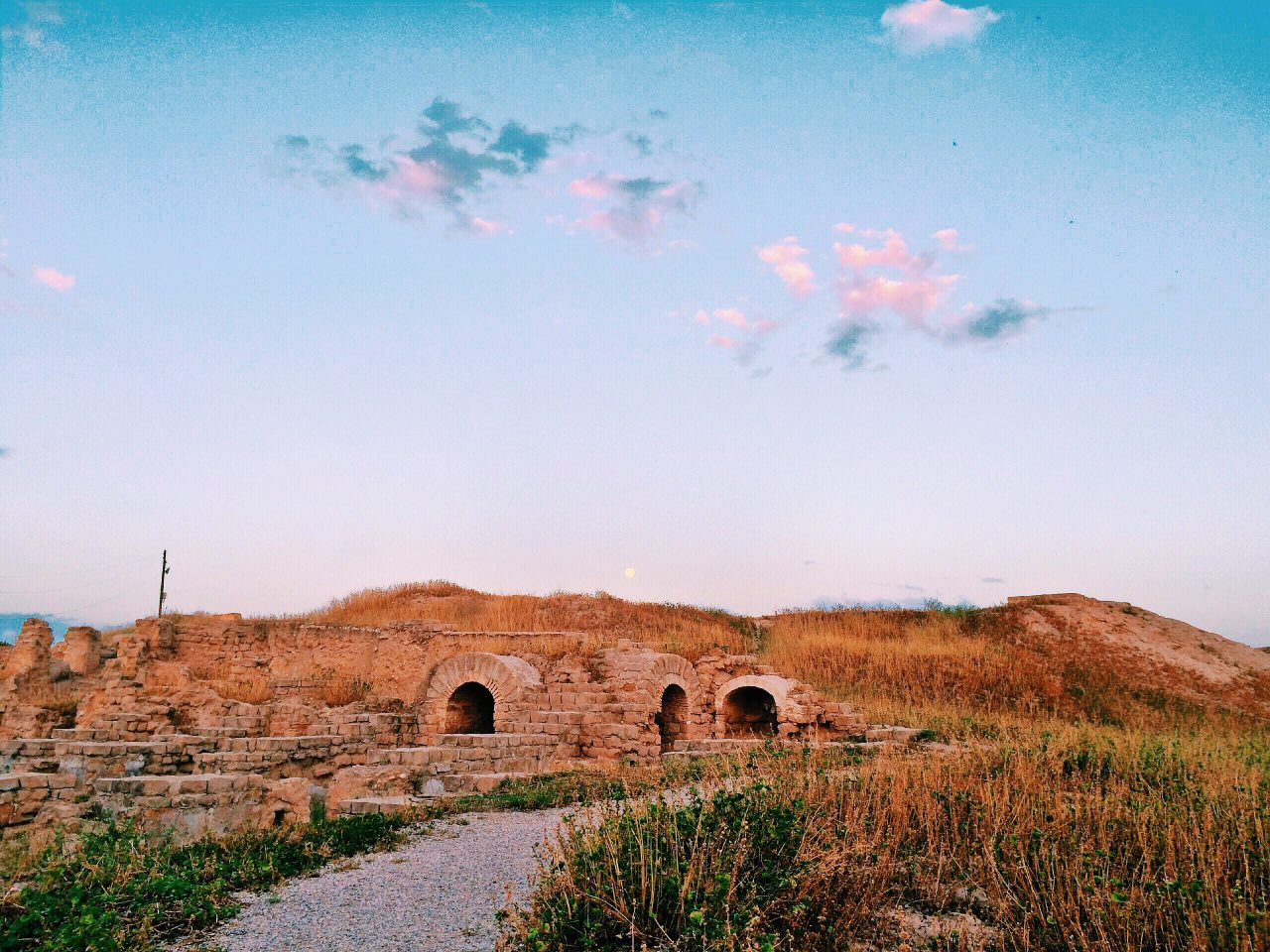

- Location within Iran
- Location: Shushtar, Khuzestan Province, Iran
- Part of: Shushtar Historical Hydraulic System
- Criteria: Cultural: (i), (ii), (v)
- Reference: 1315
- Inscription: 2009 (33rd Session)
- Area: 240.4 ha (594 acres)
- Buffer zone: 1,572.2 ha (3,885 acres)
- Coordinates: 32°3′1″N 48°51′2″E

Salasel Castle (Persian: قلعه سلاسل) is a historic fortress and World Heritage Site. It's part of Shushtar Historical Hydraulic System, located in the island city Shushtar, Khouzestan, Iran from the Achaemenid era. Salasel Castle was registered on UNESCO's list of World Heritage Sites in 2009 and is Iran's 10th cultural heritage site to be registered on the United Nations' list together with the 12 other historical bridges, dams, canals, and buildings as Shushtar Historical Hydraulic System. The castle is situated on top of a mountain and features multiple levels, secret tunnels, and various defensive structures, including walls and towers.
