= Haydari and Ne'mati =

Ḥaydari and Ne'mati were the two rival factions into which some Iranian cities and towns were historically divided. From Safavid times until the mid-20th century, these cities and towns would be divided into two groups of adjacent mahallas (neighborhoods) called the Ḥaydari-kāneh and the Ne'mati-kāneh, and their residents would express "mutual contempt and antagonism" and occasionally break out into "massive public fights". The actual locations of the neighborhoods was irrelevant. Although they had their origins in Sunni-Shi'i hostilities in the pre-Safavid period, the Haydari and Ne'mati factions did not correspond to any socioeconomic or religious grouping; their rivalry was its own separate thing. Until the mid-20th century, the Haydari-Ne'mati division was "one of the most important socio-political characteristics of Iranian cities".

== Origins ==
The Haydari-Ne'mati rivalry appears to have originated in Tabriz in the early 1400s, between the followers of two different Sufi masters: the Sunni Shah Ne'matollah Vali from Kerman and the less famous Shi'i Mir Haydar Tuni from Tabriz. The original antagonism between the two was due to Sunni-Shi'i conflict. This took on political dimensions in the late 1400s when the Sunni Aq Qoyunlu came to rule over Tabriz and openly supported the Ne'matis. Although the Haydari order appears to have dissipated before the Safavids even came to power, and the Ne'mat-Allahis later became Shi'is under Safavid rule (as did the rest of Iran), the two associated urban factions remained. By the late 16th century, the Heydari Ne'mati factions had lost any remaining religious dimension.

== Rivalry ==
Clashes between Haydaris and Ne'matis were common during major religious holidays involving large public processions. Examples included mourning processions or ta'ziyeh plays during Ashura, or the shotor-qorbani (ritual sacrifice of a camel) on Eid al-Adha. During Qajar times, a typical annual shotor-qorbani in Isfahan would involve 30 to 40 people being injured and 3 or 4 killed. The Haydari and Ne'mati moieties each held their own Muharram processions which stuck to their own quarters. Clashes often broke out between Haydaris and Ne'matis whenever a procession crossed over into the other side's territory.

At the same time, descriptions of clashes in modern times "reveal a generally low level of personal violence, actual bodily harm being replaced by ritual insult, hazing, or a symbolic 'counting coup'." John Malcolm noted that during Haydari-Ne'mati clashes at Muharram, "If they force their opponents out of their homes, they do not enter or plunder them, but make a mark on the door with a hatchet, as a token of victory". Moreover, the two groups never sought revenge after these fights - they were viewed as discrete events - so the Haydari-Ne'mati rivalry was technically not a feud.

Social life within cities was also organized based on the Haydari-Ne'mati division. Marriages were not arranged between Haydari and Ne'mati families, and some Haydaris considered the Ne'matis ritually impure (najes) and would avoid using bathhouses in Ne'mati neighborhoods. Visitors to a hosayniya in the other party's neighborhood were required to kiss the kelak (a platform in the middle of the courtyard) to show respect. The two divisions also had stereotypes of each other; for example, according to Ne'matis, "one could recognize a Haydari boy by the fact that if he were to be picked up while urinating and moved a few paces away, he would involuntarily return to the same spot and continue".

Although the Haydari-Ne'mati rivalry was "essentially a plebeian phenomenon", it also applied to members of the upper classes as well. For example, when the Qajar prince Mirza Mas'ud Zell ol-Soltan was appointed governor of Isfahan in 1882, he ended up residing in a Haydari neighborhood. When informed of this, he exclaimed, "Since I'm to be a Haydari, let's give the Ne'matis hell!"

The Haydari-Ne'mati division was not exclusive to cities; it also applied to the surrounding villages, with each one being either a Haydari village or a Ne'mati village.

== Political implications ==
The Haydari-Ne'mati division was intrinsically tied to the traditional Iranian system of local government (referred to as khan-khani), which was dominated by absentee landlord families who lived in the major cities and essentially functioned as collective governors. These landlord families were always involved in power struggles against each other, and they would "team up" with each other along Haydari-Ne'mati lines. As a result, John Perry has compared Haydaris and Ne'matis to a two-party political system in democratic governments, where the two parties compete against each other for power.

Political figures were also known to exploit the Haydari-Ne'mati rivalry for their own ends. For example, in the late 1800s, two outside parties incited Haydari-Ne'mati riots in Dezful: Shaikh Khaz'al ibn Jabir, who supported the Ne'matis, and the Bakhtiari khans, who supported the Haydaris. During the Persian Constitutional Revolution in 1906, the appointment of a Ne'mati to head the provisional anjoman (council) in Ardabil prompted the Haydaris to set up their own anjoman; the two sides ended up bringing in tribal allies from outside the city and ended up shooting at each other. John Malcolm also noted that the ruling Qajar dynasty did not try to stop the conflict between the two factions, but instead used it as a way to exercise its authority over the population. Earlier, in the early 1700s, Jean Chardin noted that when the Safavid shah was absent from Isfahan, the city's mayor (kalantar) made no attempt to stop fights between them because he was able to benefit financially from them.

== List of cities ==
The following cities featured a division into Haydari and Ne'mati factions at some point:

- Tabriz
- Ardabil
- Qazvin
- Isfahan
- Shiraz
- Dezful
- Shushtar
- Rasht
- Behbahan
- Ardakan, Fars
- Ardakan, Yazd
- Birjand

Some cities never had this dynamic, notably Tehran, Mashhad, and Kerman. Abbas I apparently attempted to introduce a similar pair of factions in Kandahar when he conquered it, but they fell out of use after the Mughal Empire retook the city.

== Legacy ==
Traditional Iranian city life began to change during the 1930s and 40s as part of the modernization programs of the Pahlavi dynasty. In the 1950s, the Haydari and Ne'mati factions were abolished and Muharram procession routes were changed as a show of "friendship and reconciliation" between the two parties.

The last known outbreak of violence between a city's Haydari and Ne'mati factions was in Ardakan, Fars in 1975.

Today, the Haydari and Ne'mati divisions still affects social life in Iranian cities. Social life is often localized for particular neighborhoods, and interaction with people from other parts of the city is less common. Marriages follow a similar pattern. This division has led to different parts of the same city sometimes having distinct accents or dialects, even in relatively small cities.

Muharram procession groups in Iranian cities are still considered "Haydari" or "Ne'mati" and are scheduled at different times based on this affiliation. New neighborhoods in Iranian cities are also considered either Haydari or Ne'mati by extending the old dividing line into them.
