= Sahl al-Tustari =

9th-century Persian scholar and mystic

Sahl al-Tustarī

Personal life
- Born: c. 818 CE (203 AH) in Shushtar, Iran
- Died: c. 896 CE (283 AH) in Basra, Iraq
- Era: Islamic golden age
- Region: Ahwaz
- Main interest(s): Sufism, Islamic theology
- Notable work: Tafsir

Religious life
- Religion: Islam
- Jurisprudence: Hanbali
- Creed: Athari

Sahl al-Tustarī (Arabic: سهل التستري) or Sahl Shushtarī (Persian: سهل شوشتری) according to Persian custom, born Abū Muḥammad Sahl ibn ʿAbd Allāh (c.818 CE (203 AH) – c.896 CE (283 AH), was a Persian Sunni Muslim Hanbali scholar and early classical Sufi mystic, belonging to the Ahl al-Hadith tradition. He founded the Salimiyah Muslim theological school, which was named after his disciple Muhammad ibn Salim.

Tustari is most famous for his controversial claim that "I am the Proof of God for the created beings and I am a proof for the saints (awliya) of my time" and for his well-known Tafsir, a commentary on and interpretation of the Qur'an.

== Biography ==
Sahl al-Tustari was born in the fortress town of Shushtar (Tustar in Arabic) during the golden age of the Abbasid Caliphate, in Khūzestān Province in what is now southwestern Iran.

From an early age he led an ascetic life with frequent fasting and study of the Qur'an and Hadith, the oral traditions, of the Islamic prophet Muhammad. He practised repentance (tawbah) and, above all, constant remembrance of God (dhikr). This eventually culminated in a direct and intimate rapport with God with whom he considered himself a special friend and one of the spiritual elect.

Tustari was under the direction of the Sufi saint Dhul-Nun al-Misri for a time, and Tustari in his turn was one of the Sufi mystic Mansur Al-Hallaj's early teachers.

Tustari also kept the company of hadith scholars. It is reported that when he met Abu Dawud, he said, "O Abu Dawud, I want something from you." Abu Dawud responded, "What is it?" Sahl said, "On the condition that you will fulfill my request if it is possible." Abu Dawud replied in the affirmative. Sahl said, "Show me that tongue with which you narrate the hadiths of the Prophet (peace be upon him) so that I might kiss it." Abu Dawud assented, and Sahl kissed his tongue. This shows the close proximate of early hadith scholars and early Sufis.

In these early days when the Sufis were becoming established mostly in Baghdad (the capital of modern Iraq), the most notable Sufis of the time elsewhere were: Tustari in southwestern Iran, Al-Tirmidhi in Central Asia and the Malamatiyya or "People of Blame". Also the chief leader of the Hanabila, al-Barbahari, was a disciple of Tustari.

An Islamic scholar who commented on and interpreted the Qur'an, Tustari maintained that the Qur'an "contained several levels of meaning", which included the outer or zahir and the inner or batin. Another key idea that he unravelled was the meaning of Muhammad's saying "I am He and He is I, save that I am I, and He is He", explaining it "as a mystery of union and realization at the center of the Saint's personality, called the sirr ('the secret'), or the heart, where existence joins Being." Tustari also "was the first to put" the Sufi exercise of remembrance of God, Dhikr, "on a firm theoretical basis."

[Tustari] maintained that ultimately [...] it became clear to the recollector that the true agent of recollection was not the believer engaged in recollection but God Himself, who commemorated Himself in the heart of the believer. This realisation of God's control over the heart led the believer to the state of complete trust in the Divine.

== Works ==
- al-Tustari, Sahl ibn 'Abd Allah (December 2009). Meri, Yousef (ed.). Tafsir Al-Tustari: Great Commentaries of the Holy Qur'an. Translated by Keeler, Annabel; Keeler, Ali. Fons Vitae. ISBN 978-1-891785-19-1.

== Sayings ==
- "I am the Proof of God for the created beings and I am a proof for the saints (awliya) of my time"
- Asked "What is food?" Tustari replied: "Food is contemplation of the Living One."
- "Whoever wakes up worrying about what he will eat -- shun him!"
- "If any one shuts his eye to God for a single moment, he will never be rightly guided all his life long"
