= Lashkar Bridge =

Complex irrigation system from the Sasanian era, island city Shushtar, Iran

Shushtar Historical Hydraulic System
UNESCO World Heritage Site
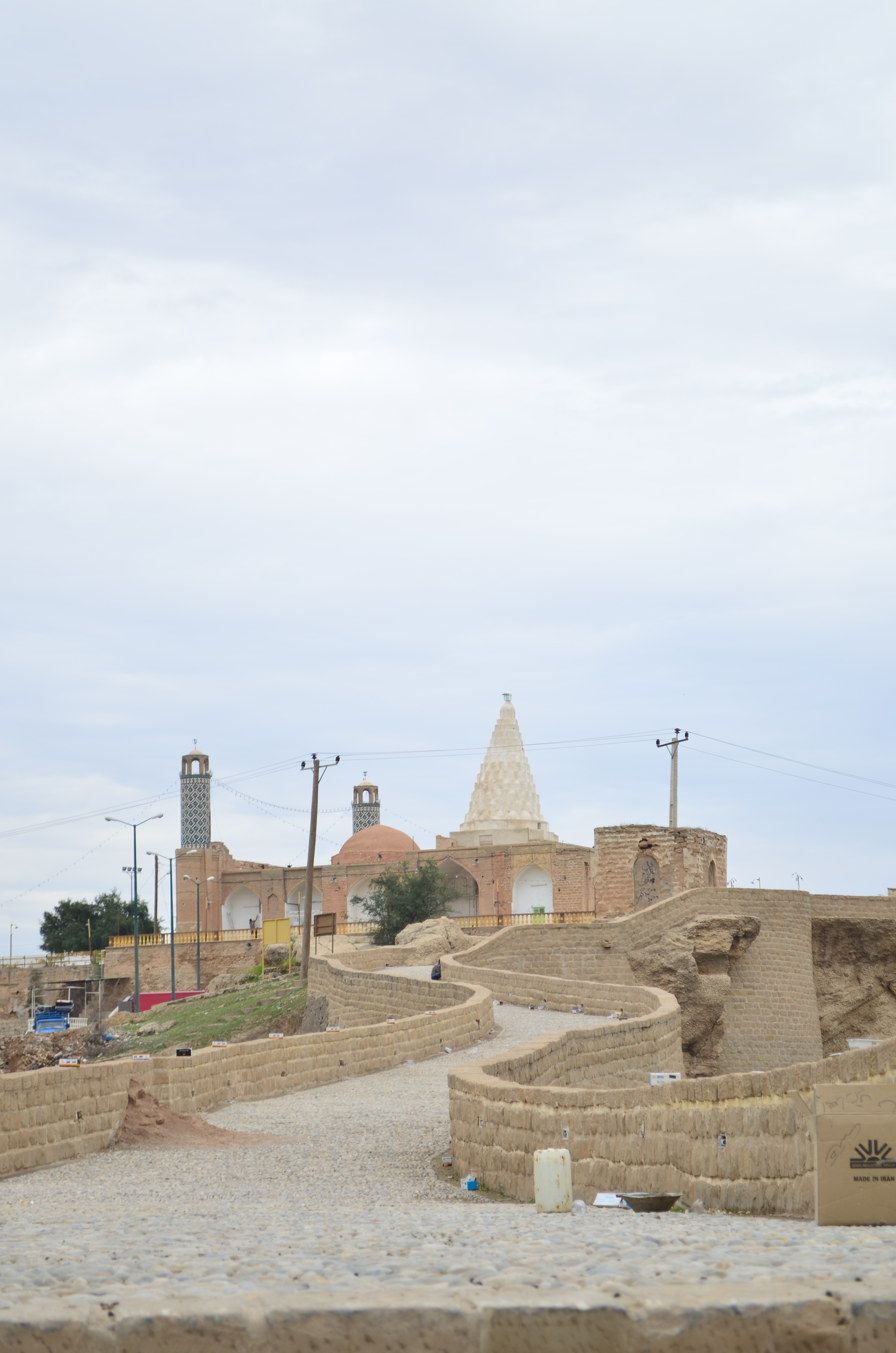

- Location within Iran
- Location: Shushtar, Khuzestan Province, Iran
- Criteria: Cultural: (i), (ii), (v)
- Reference: 1315
- Inscription: 2009 (33rd Session)
- Area: 240.4 ha (594 acres)
- Buffer zone: 1,572.2 ha (3,885 acres)
- Coordinates: 32°1′10″N 48°50′5″E

Lashkar Bridge-Dam, (Persian: پل بند لشکر) is a world heritage site, a part of Shushtar Historical Hydraulic System, located in the island city Shushtar, Khuzestan province, Iran from the Achaemenid era. Lashkar Bridge was registered on UNESCO's list of World Heritage Sites in 2009 and is Iran's 10th cultural heritage site to be registered on the United Nations' list together with the 12 other historical bridges, dams, canals, and buildings as Shushtar Historical Hydraulic System.
