= Shoushtar Historical Hydraulic System =

Irrigation system in Shushtar, Iran

Shushtar Historical Hydraulic System
UNESCO World Heritage Site
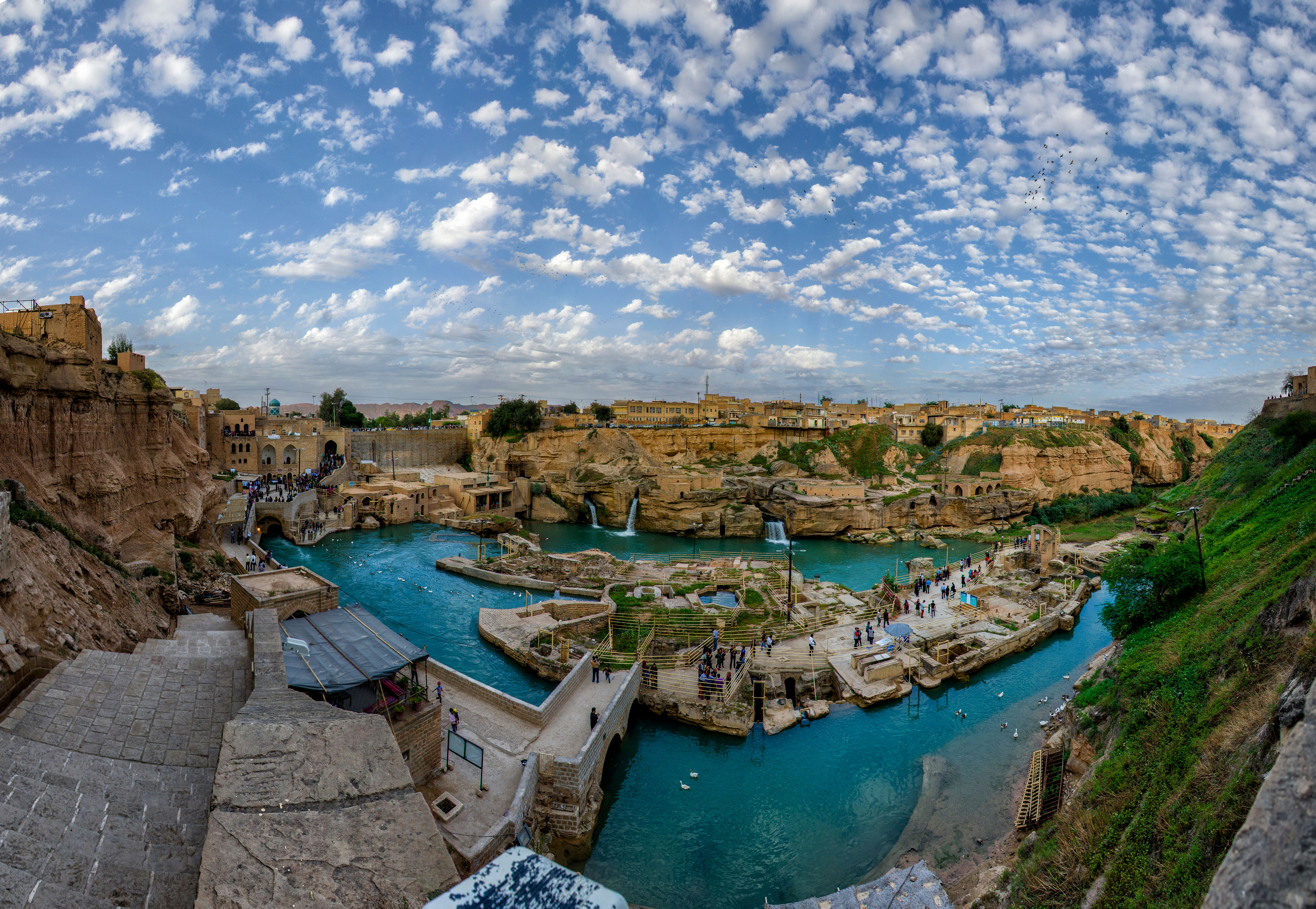
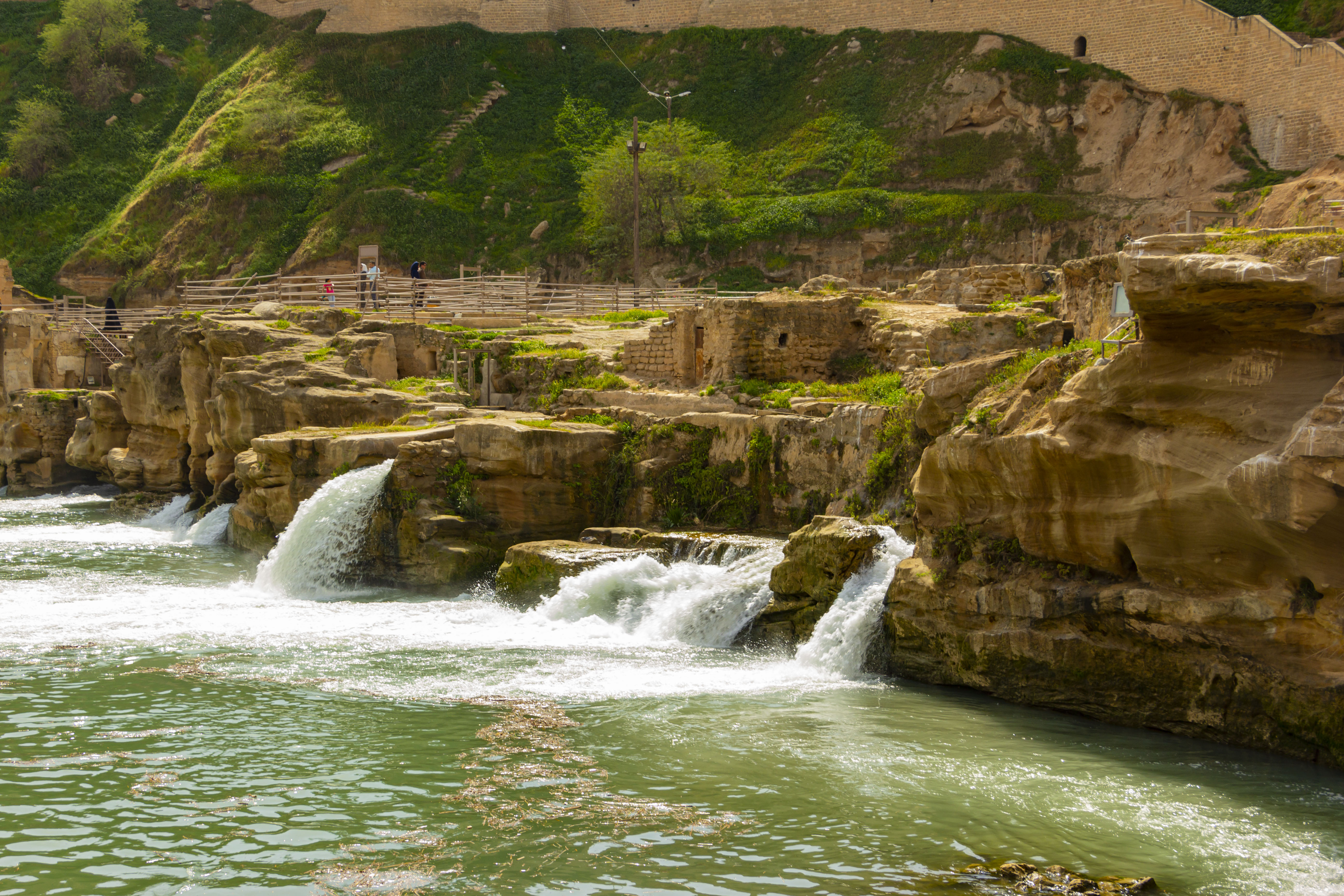
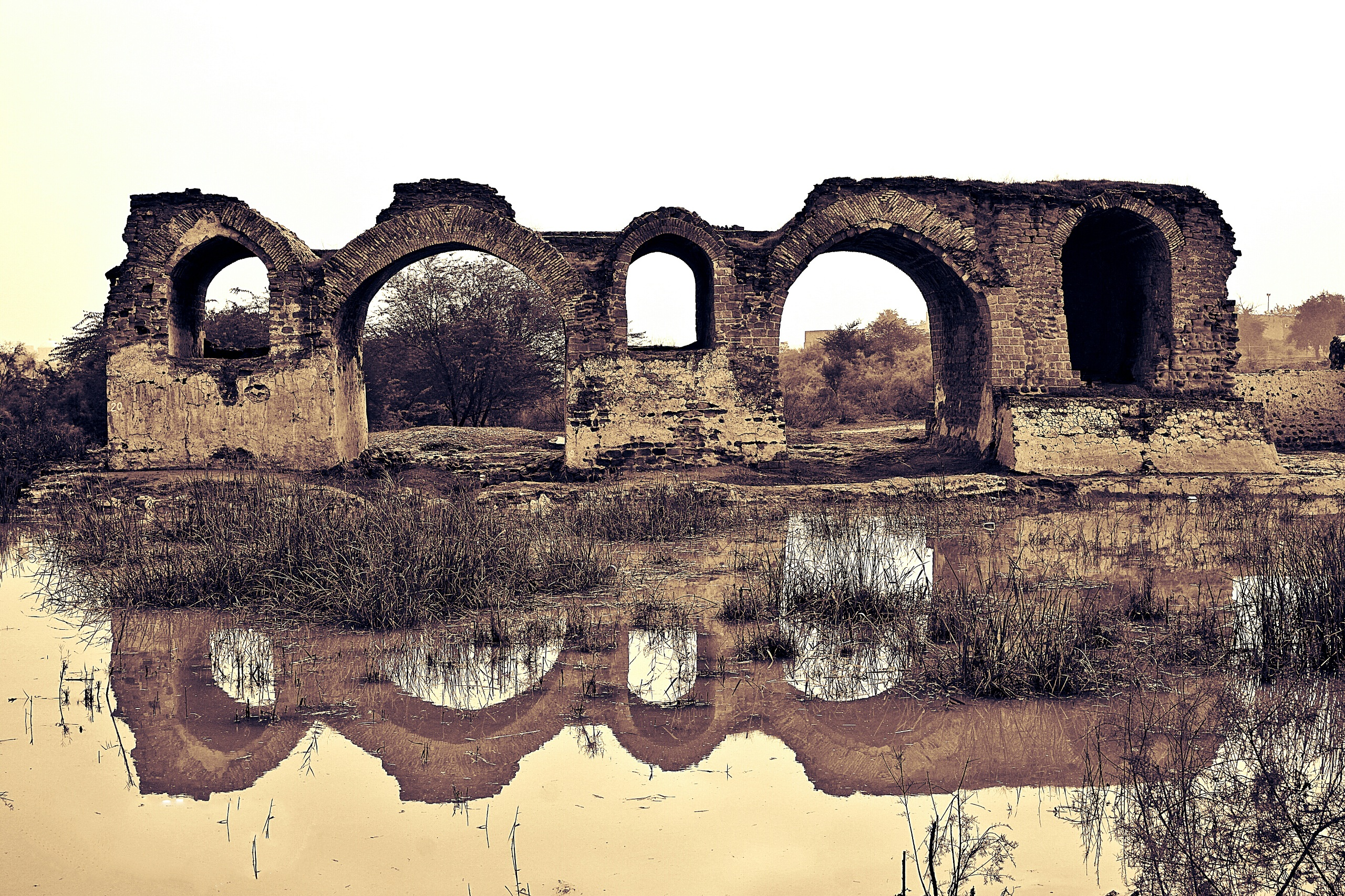
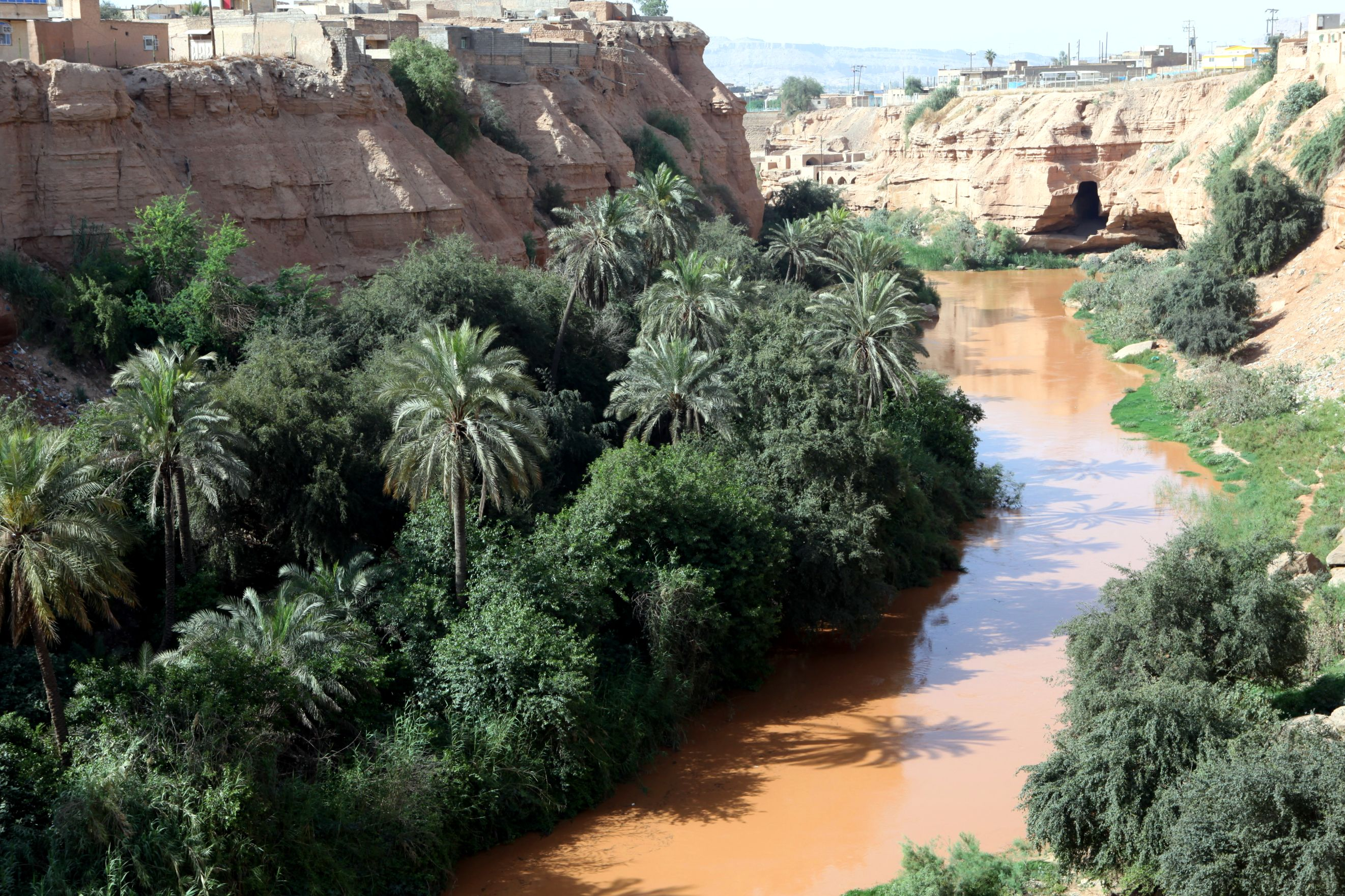
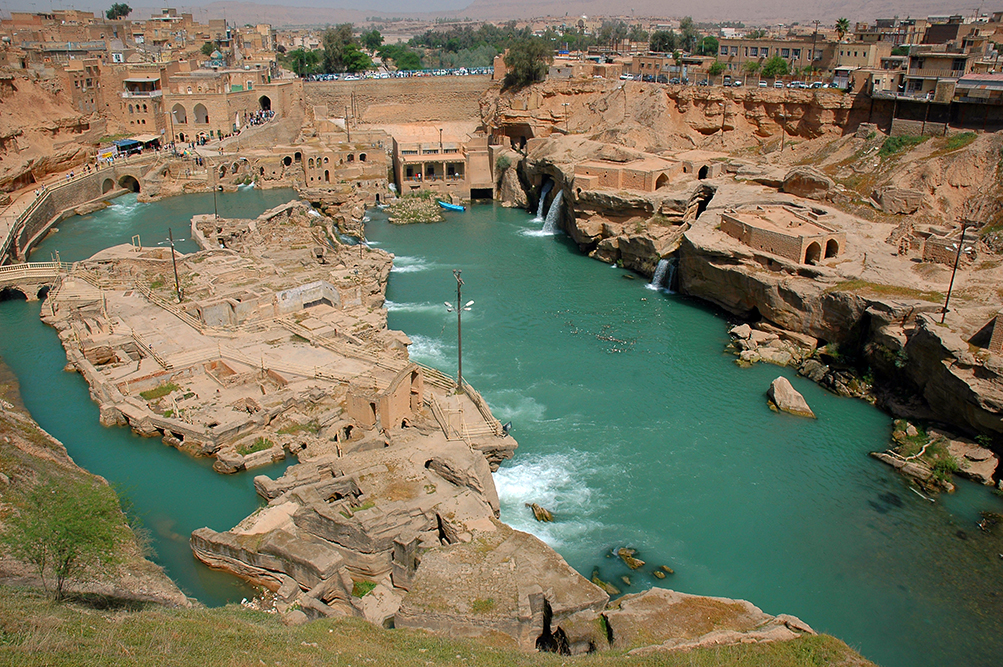
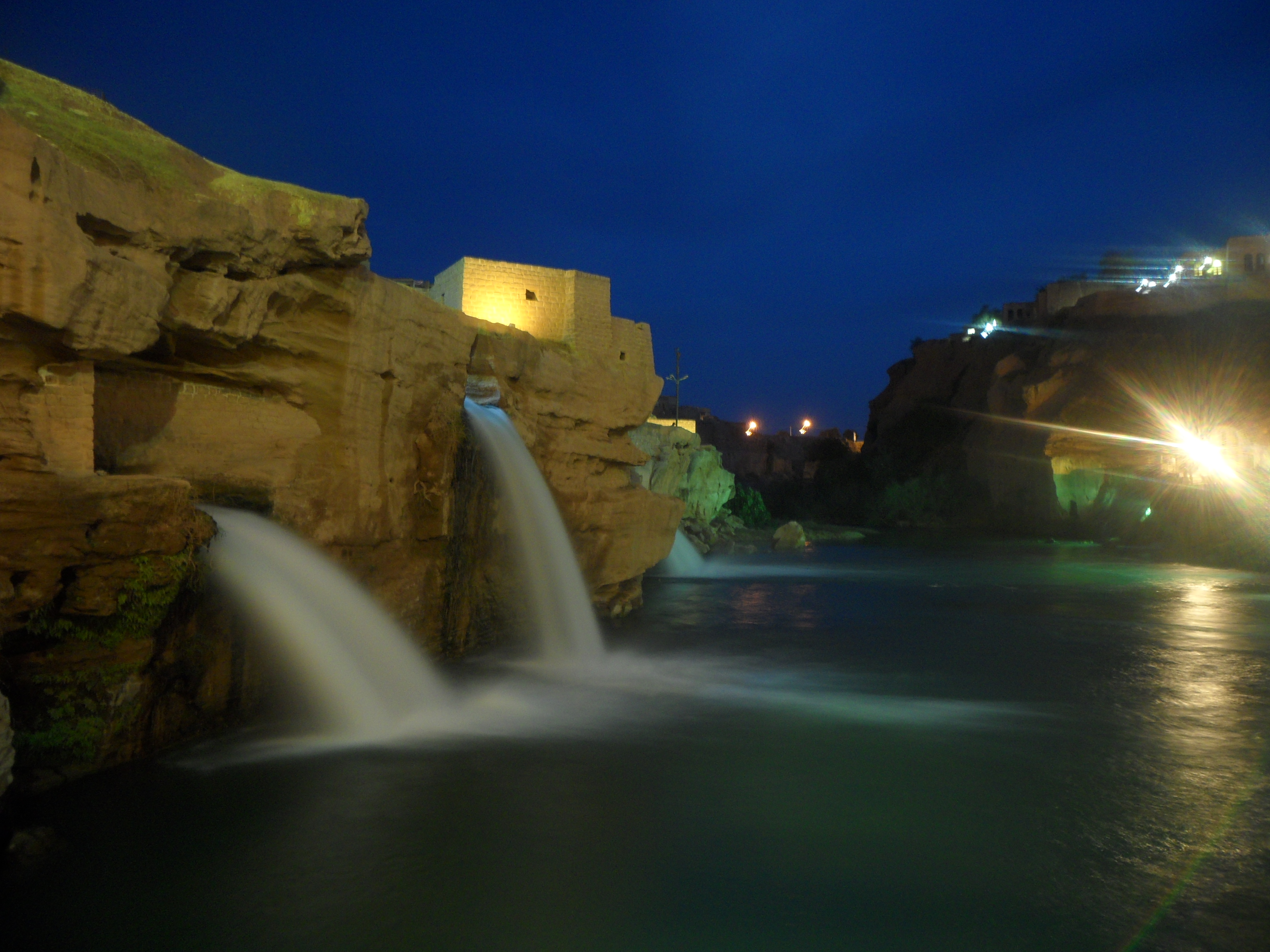
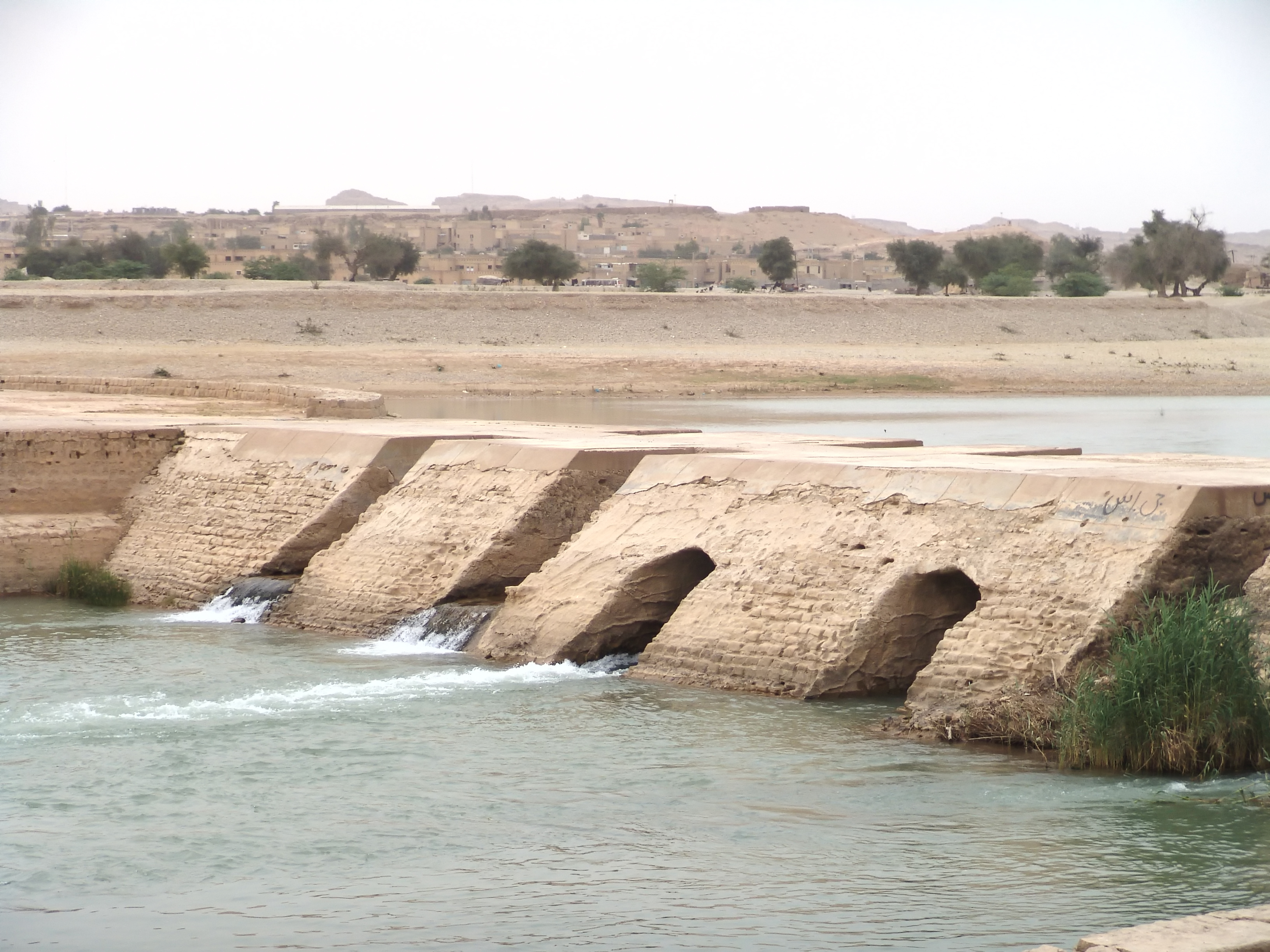
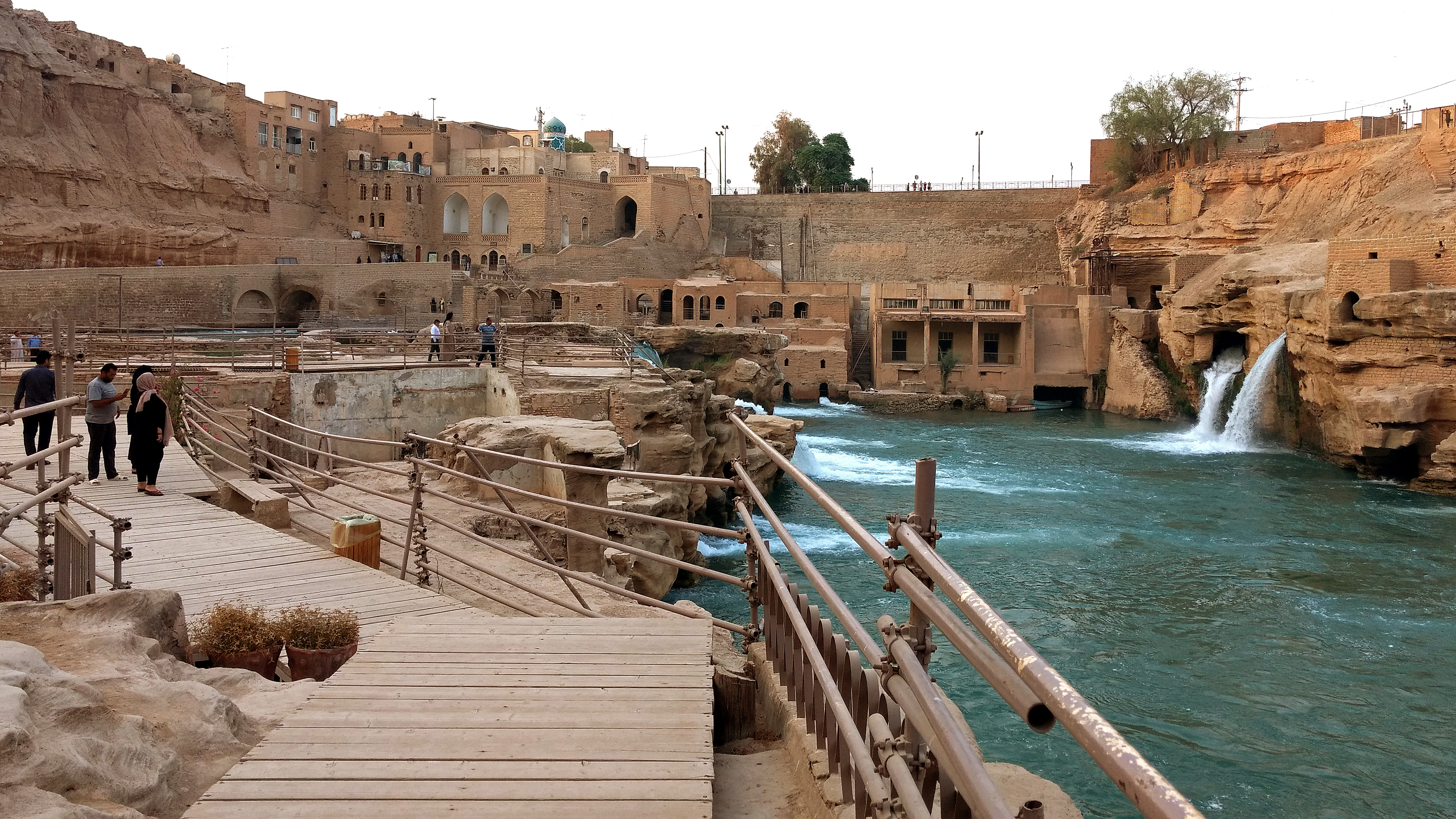

- Location within Iran Location within West and Central Asia
- Location: Shushtar County, Khuzestan province, Iran
- Criteria: Cultural: (i), (ii), (v)
- Reference: 1315
- Inscription: 2009 (33rd Session)
- Area: 240.4 ha (594 acres)
- Buffer zone: 1,572.2 ha (3,885 acres)
- Coordinates: 32.0441°N 48.8585°E

The Shoushtar Historical Hydraulic System (Persian: سازه‌های آبی شوشتر) is a complex irrigation system of the island city Shoushtar from the Sasanian era. It consists of 13 dams, bridges, canals and structures which work together as a hydraulic system.

Located in Iran's Khuzestan province, it was registered on UNESCO's list of World Heritage Sites in 2009 and is Iran's 10th cultural heritage site to be registered on the United Nations' list.

This engineering masterpiece is unique both in Iran and in the world. The Sassanids, whose economy was mainly dependent on agriculture, developed extensive irrigation systems in this region.

Infrastructure included water mills, dams, tunnels, and canals. Gargar Bridge-Dam was built on the watermills and waterfalls. Bolayti Canal is situated on the eastern side of the falls, and functions to supply water from behind the bridge-dam's ridge to the east side of the watermills, channeling the water to prevent damage to the mills. Dahaneye Shahr Tunnel (city orifice) is one of the three main tunnels which channel water from behind the Gargar Bridge-Dam into several water mills. The Seh kooreh Canal directs water from behind the bridge-dam to the western side of the complex. In the water mills and waterfalls, we can see a perfect model of haltering to run mills.

The Band-e Kaisar ("Caesar's dam"), an approximately 500-metre (1,600 ft) long Roman weir across the Karun, was the key structure of the complex which, along with the Mizan Dam (Band-e Mizan), retained and diverted river water into irrigation canals in the area. Built by a Roman workforce in the 3rd century AD on Sassanid orders, it was the most eastern Roman bridge or Roman dam and was the first structure in Iran to combine a bridge with a dam.

Parts of the irrigation system are said to originally date to the time of Darius the Great, an Achaemenid ruler. It partly consists of a pair of primary diversion canals in the Karun river, one of which is still in use today. It delivers water to the Shoushtar city via a route of supplying tunnels. The area includes Salasel Castle, which is the axis for operation of the hydraulic system. It also consists of a tower for water level measurement, along with bridges, dams, mills, and basins.

It then enters the plain south of the city, where its impact includes enabling the possibility of local farming and planting of orchards. The area between the diversion canals (Shutayt and Gargar) on the Karun River is called Mianâb, an island with Shoushtar city at its northern end.

The site has been referred to as "a masterpiece of creative genius" by UNESCO.

== Sites ==
Shoushtar Historical Hydraulic System is a complex of dams, bridges, canals and structures located in 13 different sites which work together as a single hydraulic system.

1. Mizan Dam

2. Kolah-Farangi Tower

3. Gargar Canal

4. Gargar Bridge-Dam

5. Watermills and Waterfalls area

6. Borj Ayar Bridge-Dam and Sabein Sanctuary

7. Khoda-Afrain Bridge-Dam

8. Salasel Castle

9. Dariun Canal

10. Shadorvan Bridge-Dam

11. Band-e Khak Dam

12. Lashkar Bridge-Dam

13. Sharabdar Dam

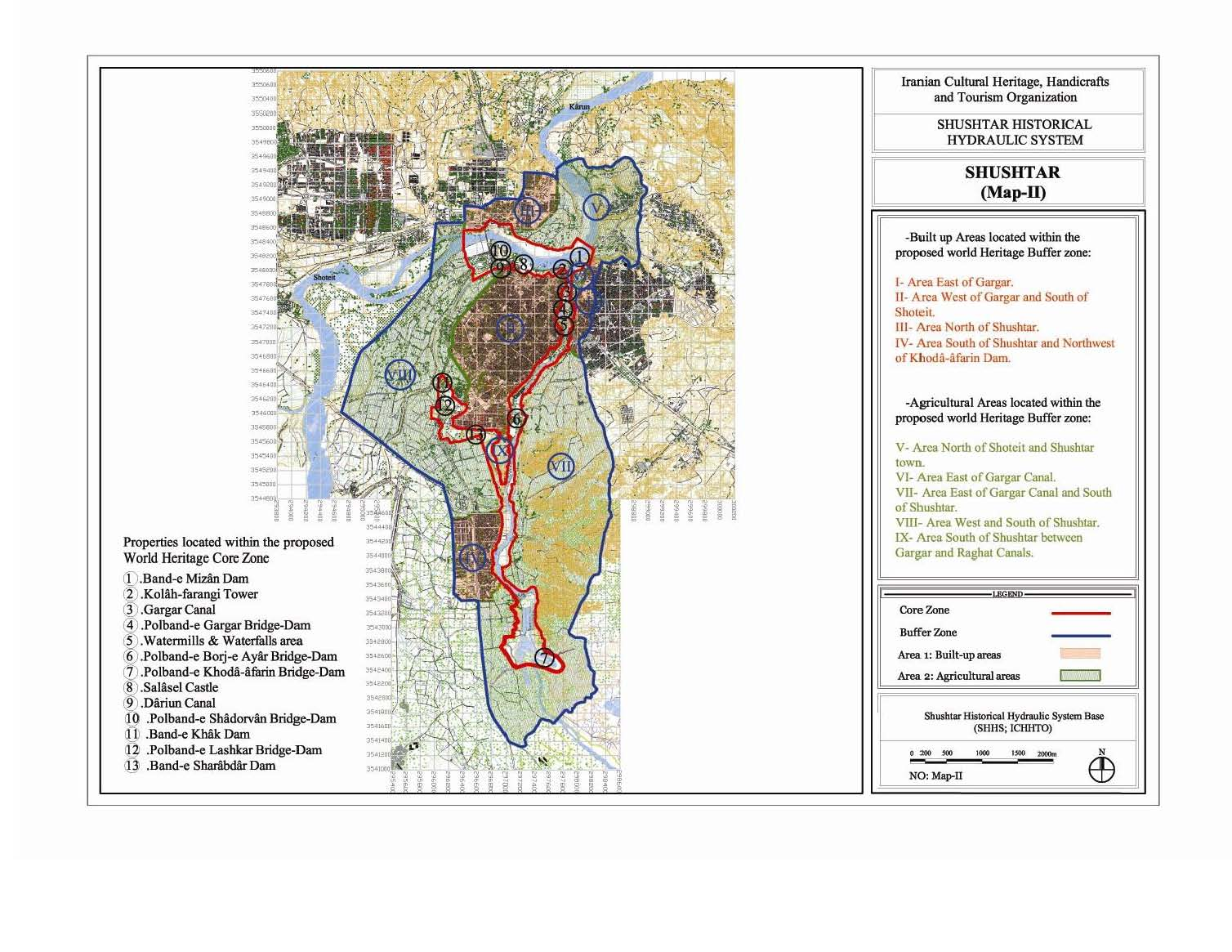
Location of the 13 sites of Shushtar Historical Hydraulic System

== Gallery ==
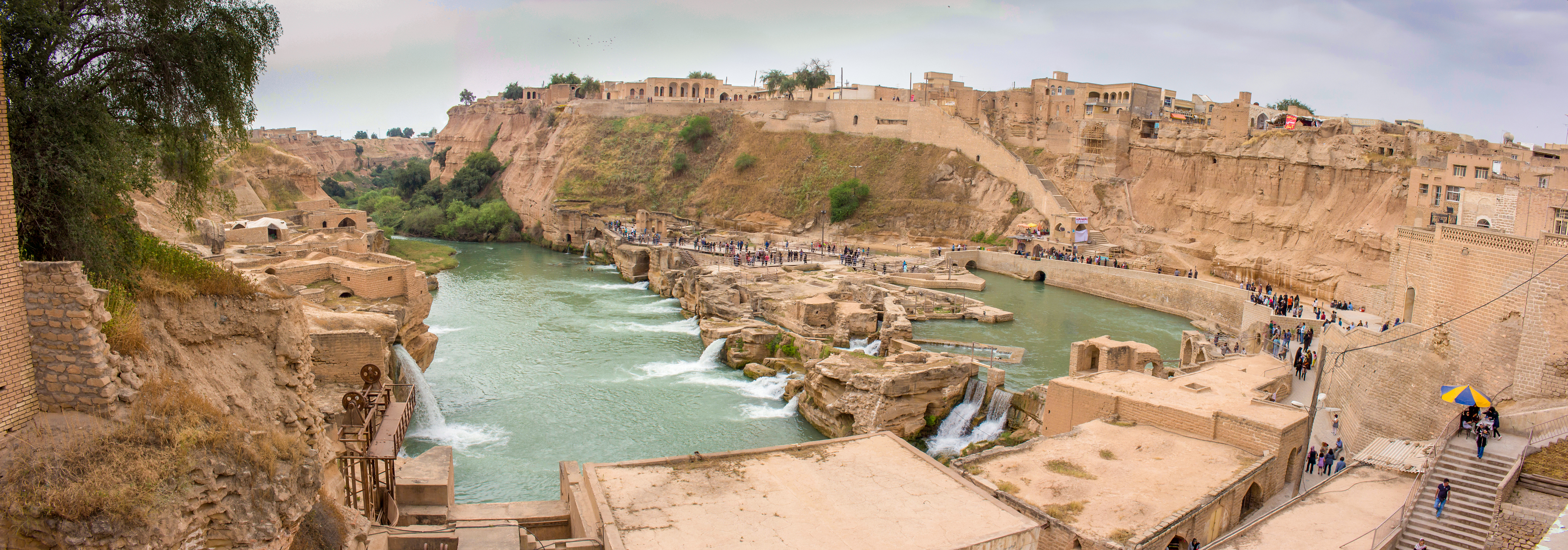

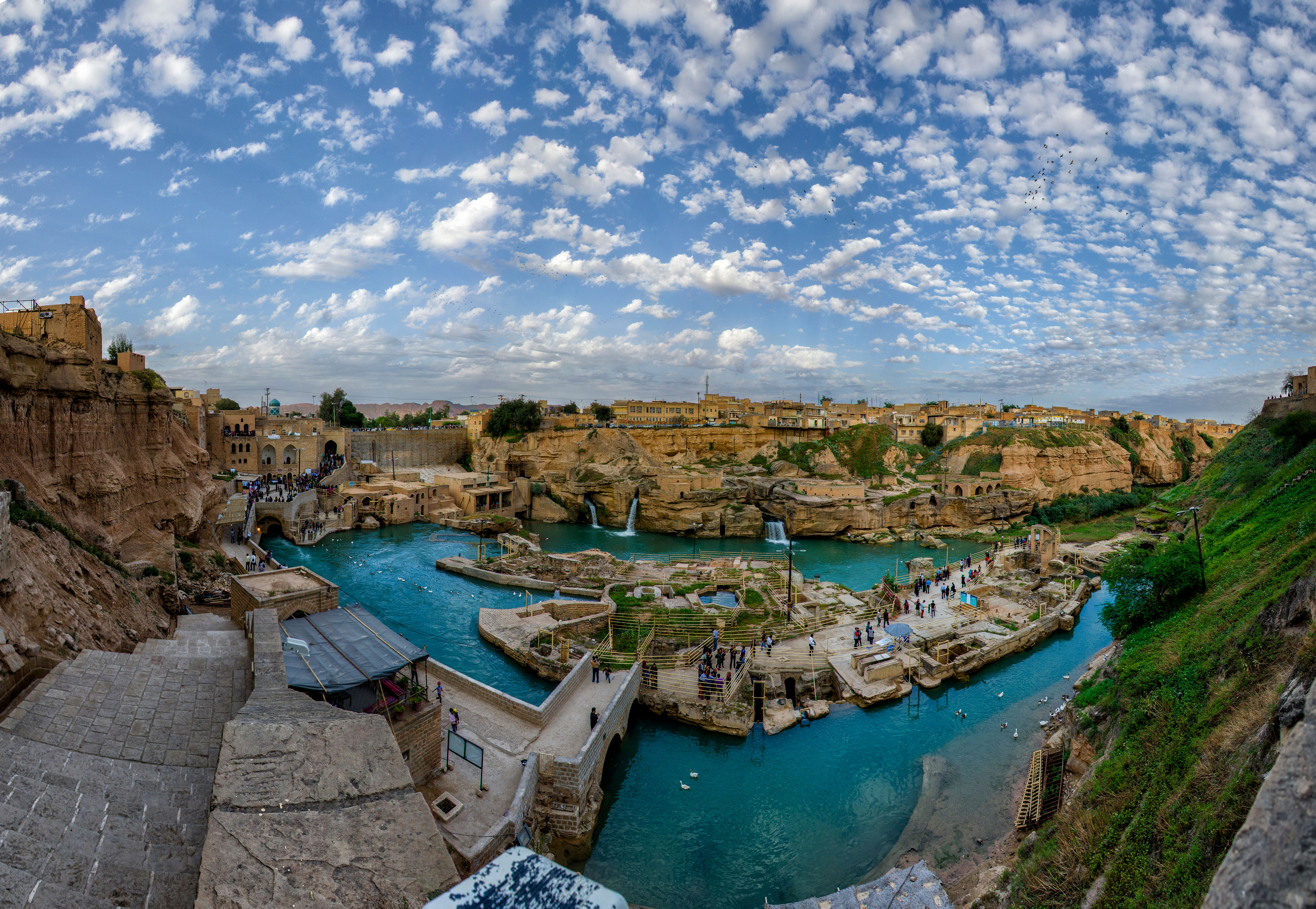

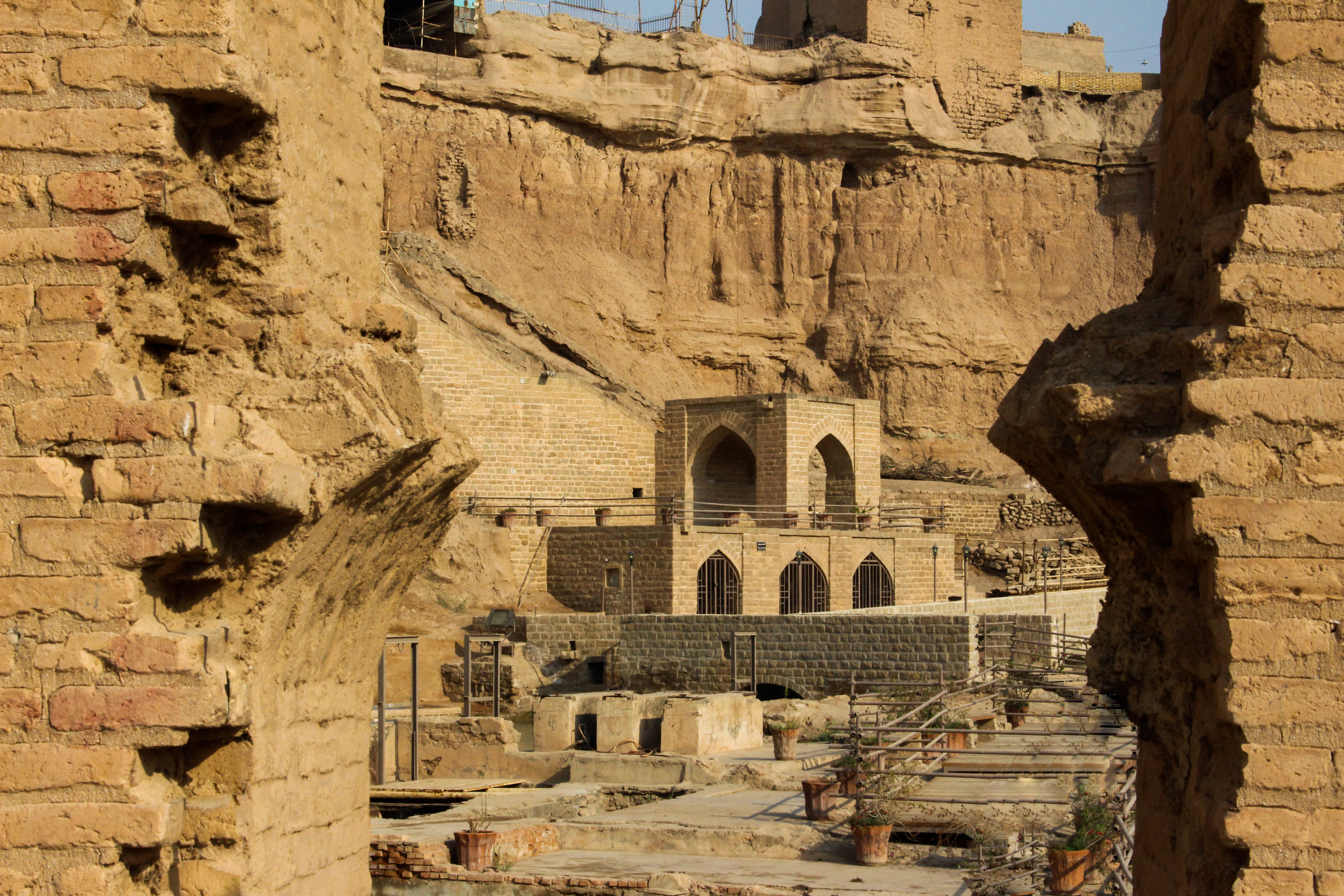

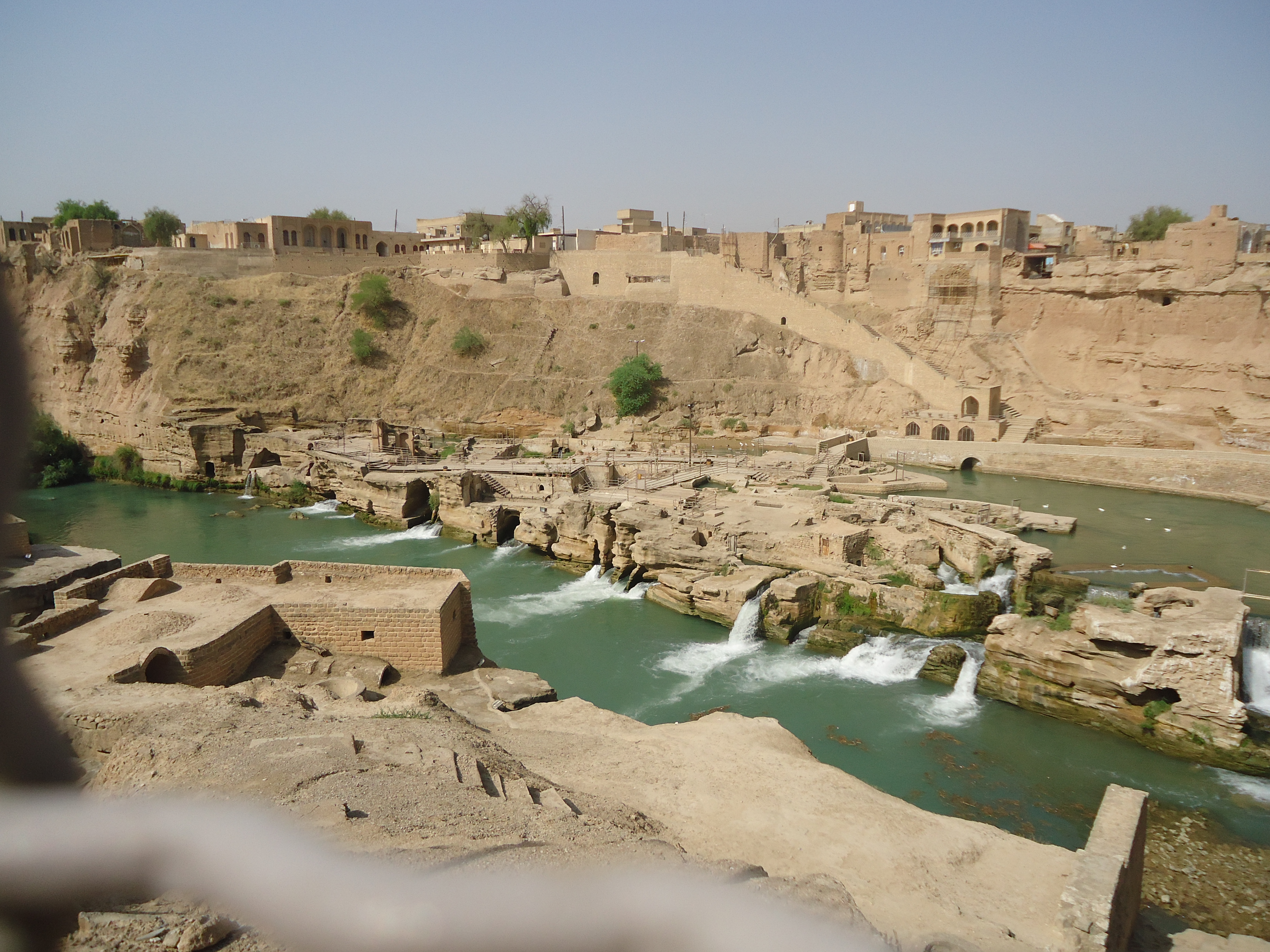

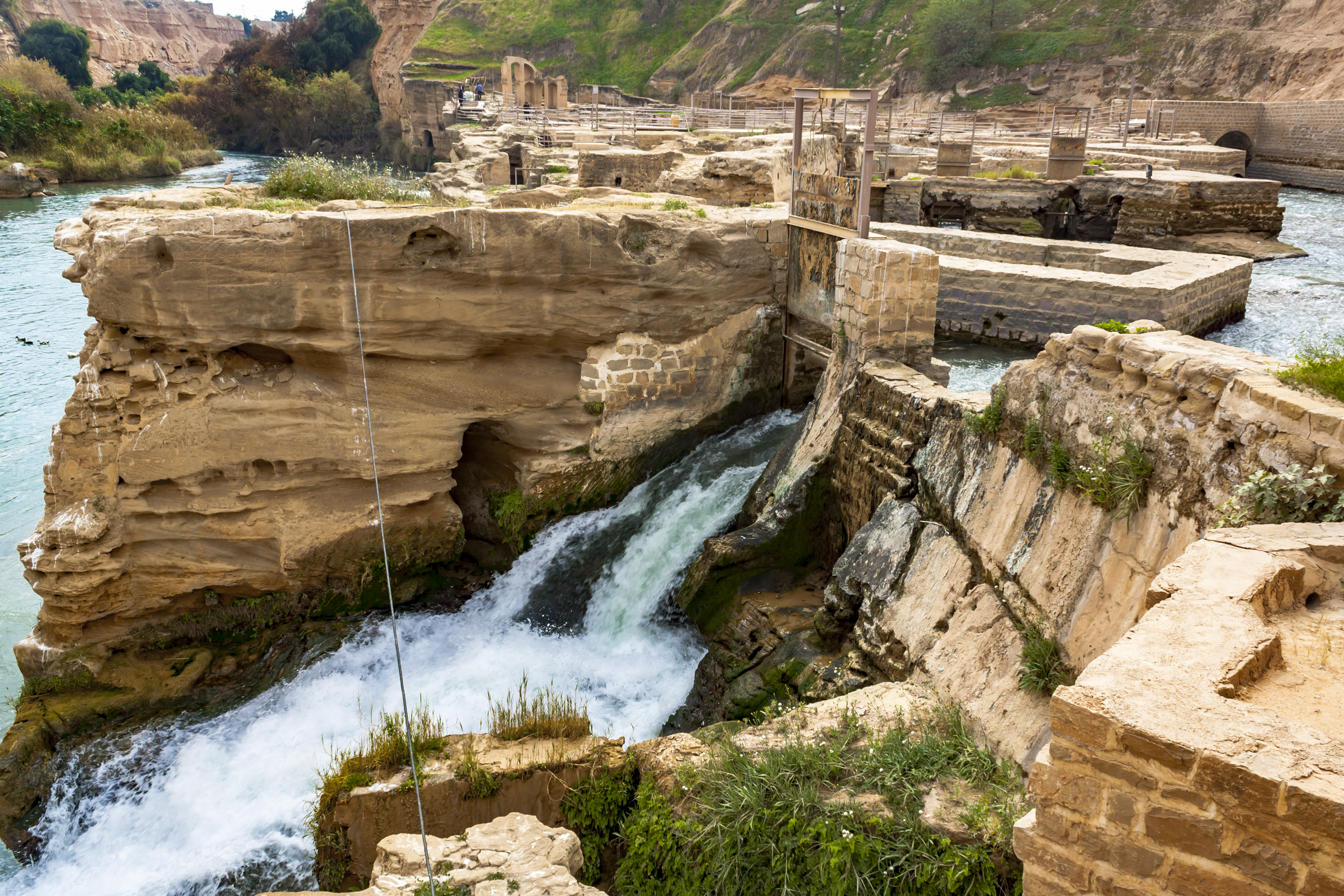

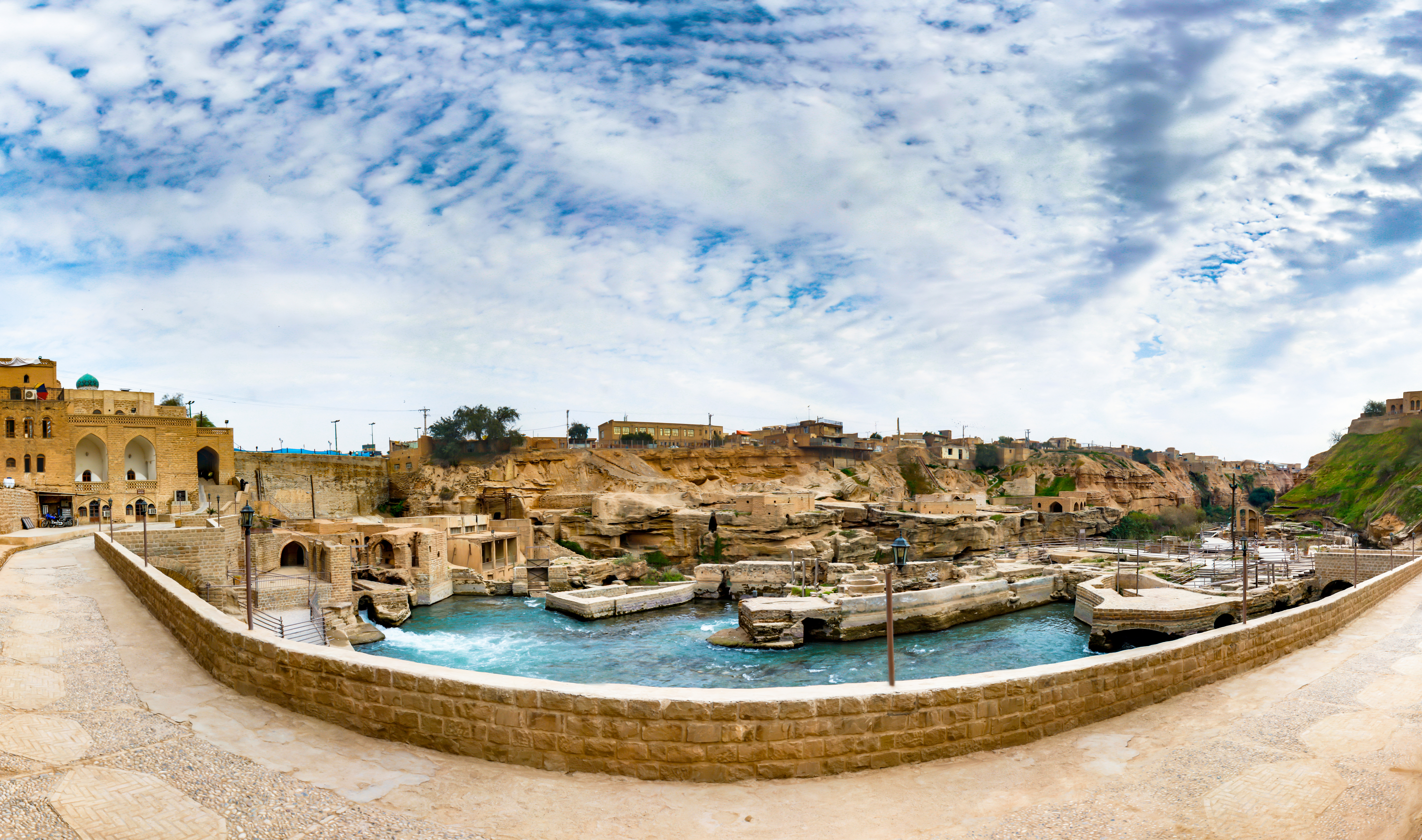

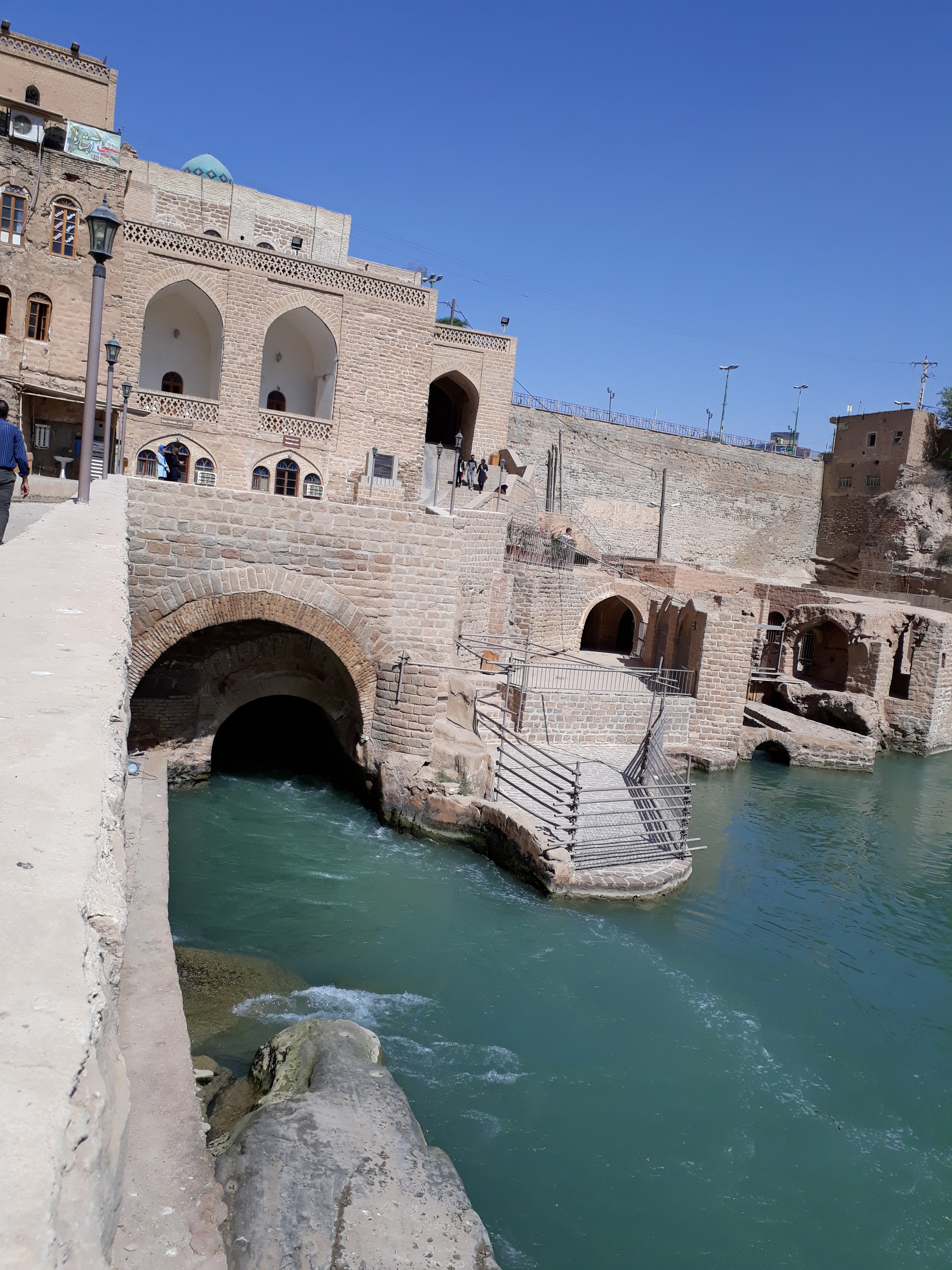

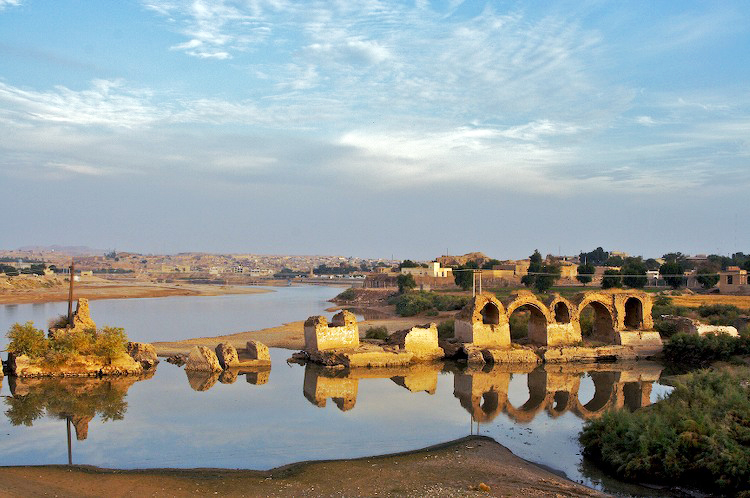

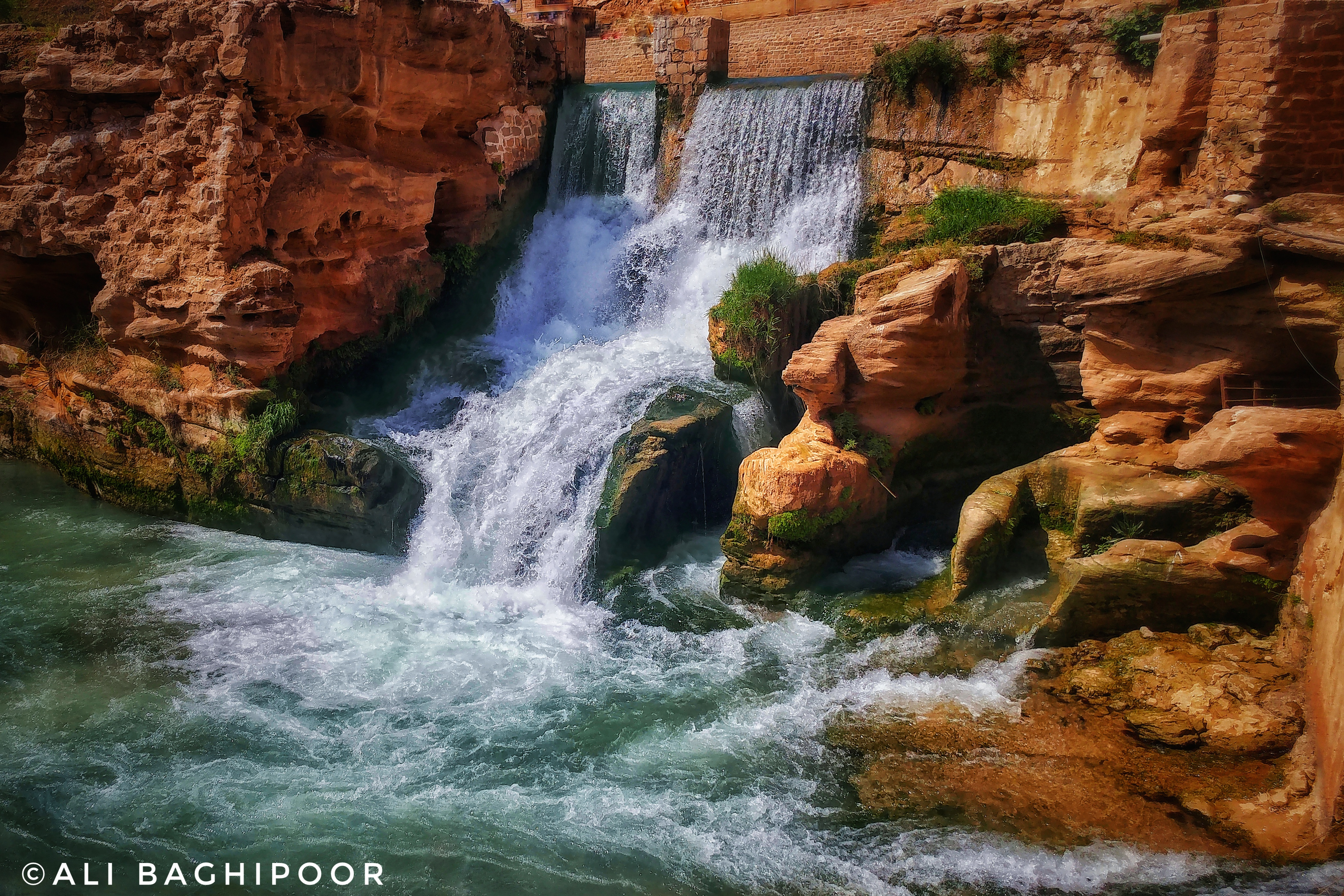

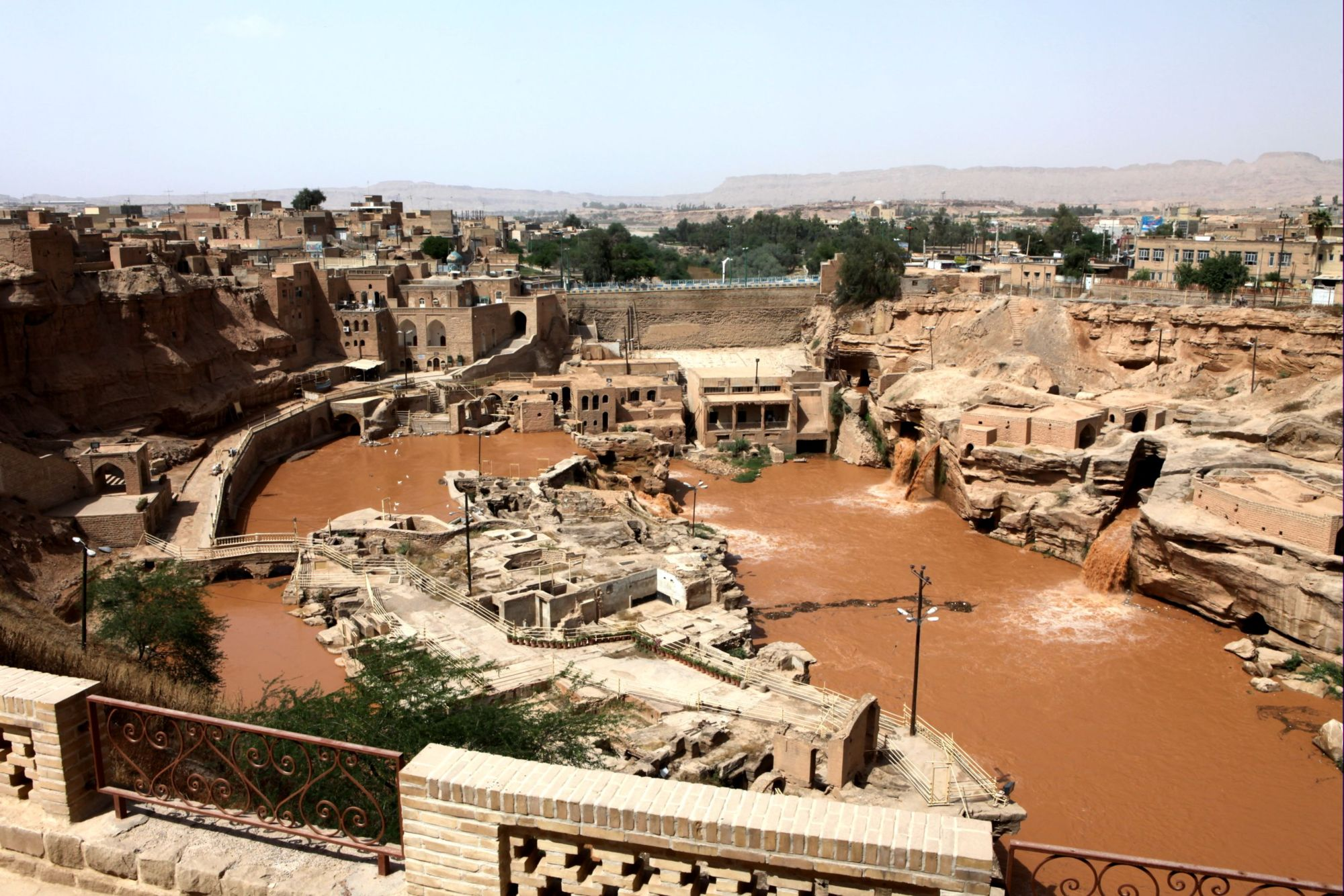

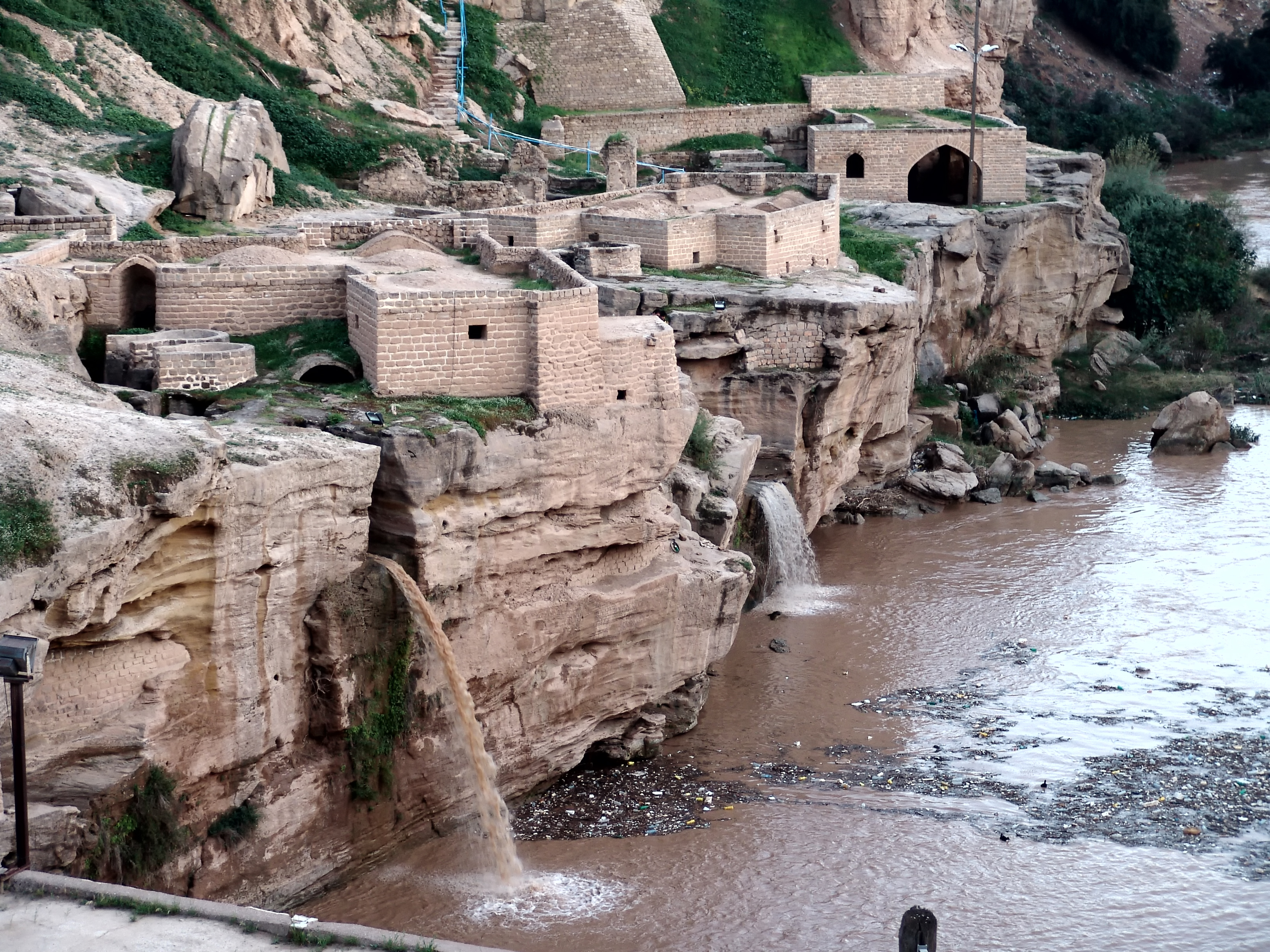

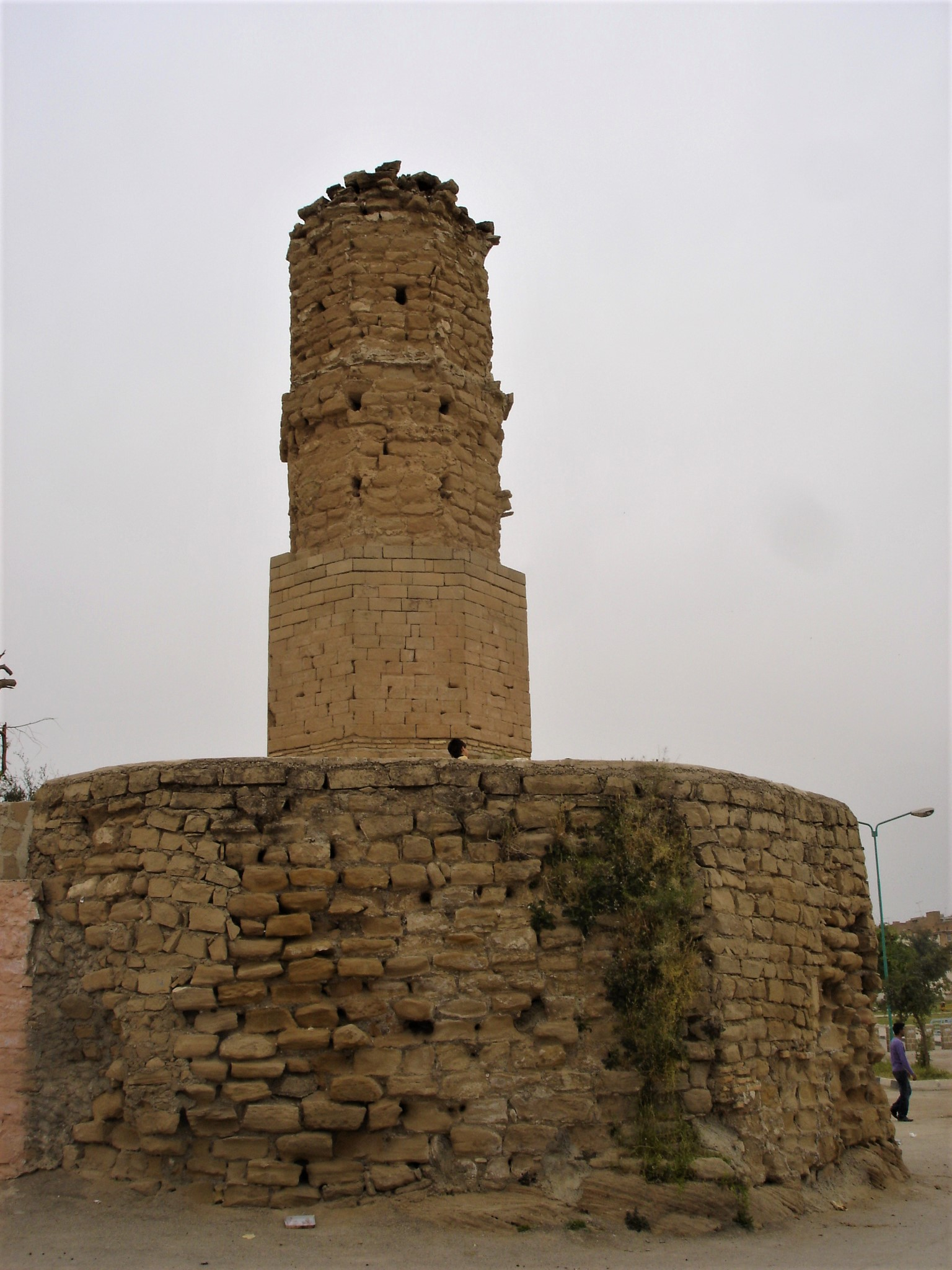

== Sources ==
- Hartung, Fritz; Kuros, Gh. R. (1987). "Historische Talsperren im Iran". In Garbrecht, Günther (ed.). Historische Talsperren (in German). Vol. 1. Stuttgart: Verlag Konrad Wittwer. pp. 221–74. ISBN 9783879191451.
- Hodge, A. Trevor (1992). Roman Aqueducts & Water Supply. Duckworth. ISBN 0715621947.
- Hodge, A. Trevor (2000). "Reservoirs and Dams". In Wikander, Örjan (ed.). Handbook of Ancient Water Technology. Technology and Change in History. Vol. 2. Brill. pp. 331–9. ISBN 90-04-11123-9.
- Huff, Dietrich; Kleiss, Wolfram (2015) [1989]. "Bridges. Pre-Islamic Bridges". In Yarshater, Ehsan (ed.). Encyclopædia Iranica (Online ed.). Encyclopædia Iranica Foundation.
- Kleiss, Wolfram (1983). "Brückenkonstruktionen in Iran". Architectura. 13: 105–112.
- Kramers, Johannes H. (1997). "Shushtar". In Bosworth, C. Edmund; van Donzel, Emeri; Heinrichs, Wolfhart P.; Lecomte, E.J. (eds.). The Encyclopaedia of Islam. Vol. IX (San-Sze) (New ed.). Brill. ISBN 9789004104228.
- O'Connor, Colin (1993). Roman Bridges. Cambridge University Press. ISBN 9780521393263.
- Schnitter, Niklaus (1978). "Römische Talsperren". Antike Welt (in German). 8 (2): 25–32.
- Smith, Norman (1971). A History of Dams. Citadel Press. ISBN 9780432150900.
- Vogel, Alexius (1987). "Die historische Entwicklung der Gewichtsmauer". In Garbrecht, Günther (ed.). Historische Talsperren (in German). Vol. 1. Stuttgart: Verlag Konrad Wittwer. pp. 47–56. ISBN 9783879191451.
