= Gargar River =

Complex irrigation system from the Sasanian era, island city Shushtar, Iran

Shushtar Historical Hydraulic System
UNESCO World Heritage Site
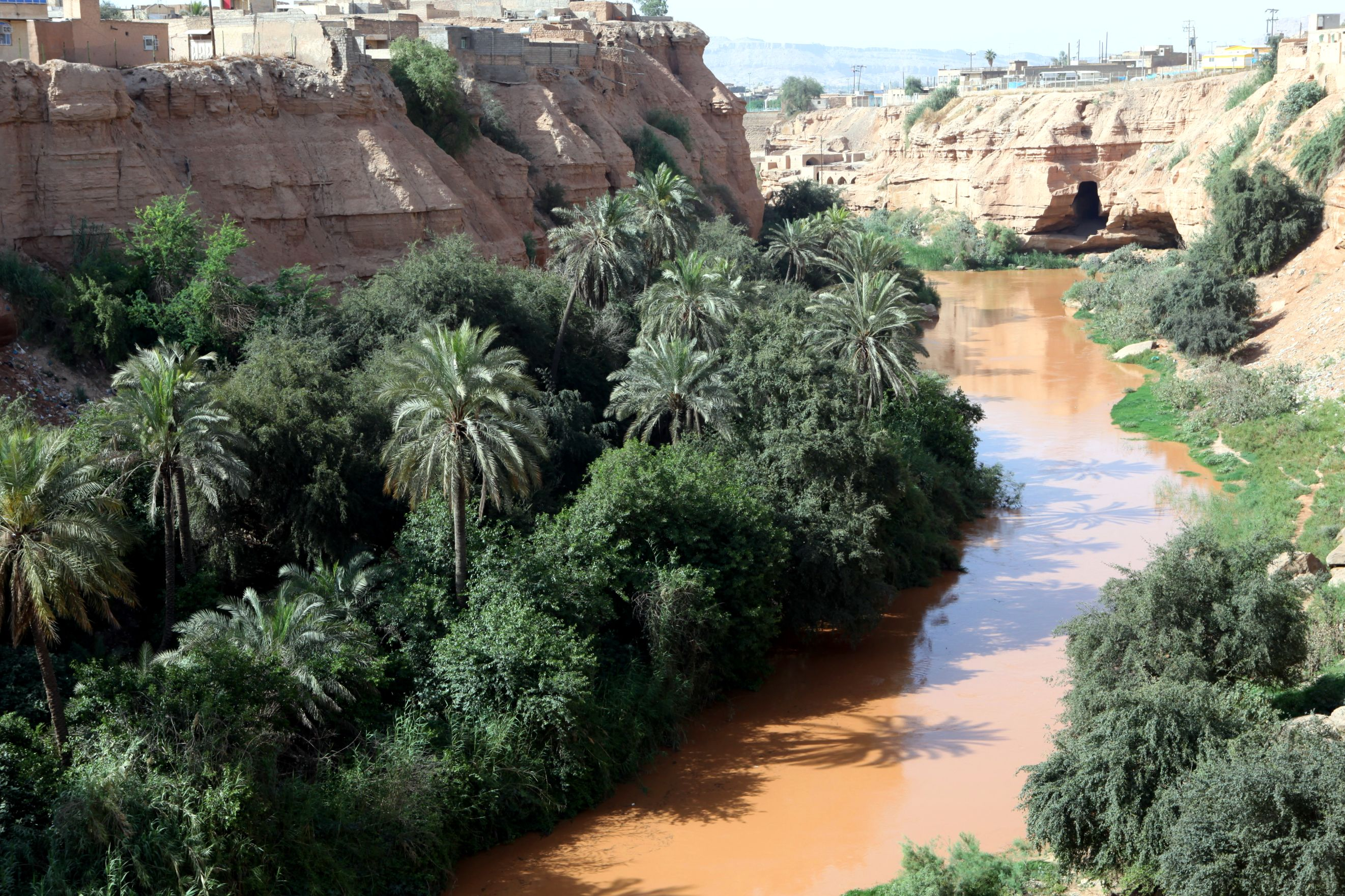

- Location within Iran
- Location: Shushtar County, Khuzestan Province, Iran
- Part of: Shushtar Historical Hydraulic System
- Criteria: Cultural: (i), (ii), (v)
- Reference: 1315
- Inscription: 2009 (33rd Session)
- Area: 240.4 ha (594 acres)
- Buffer zone: 1,572.2 ha (3,885 acres)
- Coordinates: 32°3′2″N 48°51′6″E (beginning point)

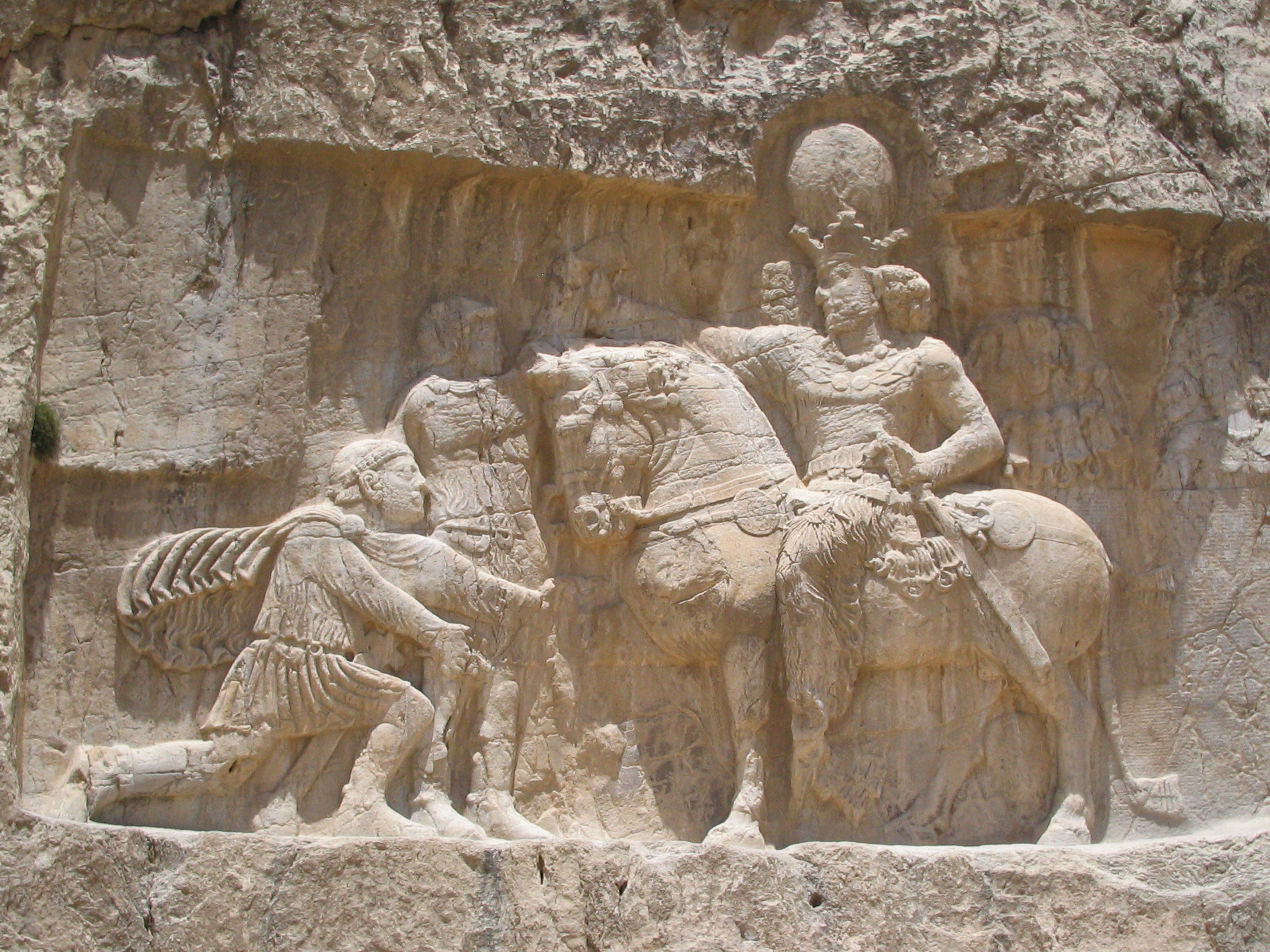
Shapur I victorious over Valerian, as depicted at Naqsh-e Rostam. Shapur used captive Roman architects to build bridges, dams and rivers in Shushtar.

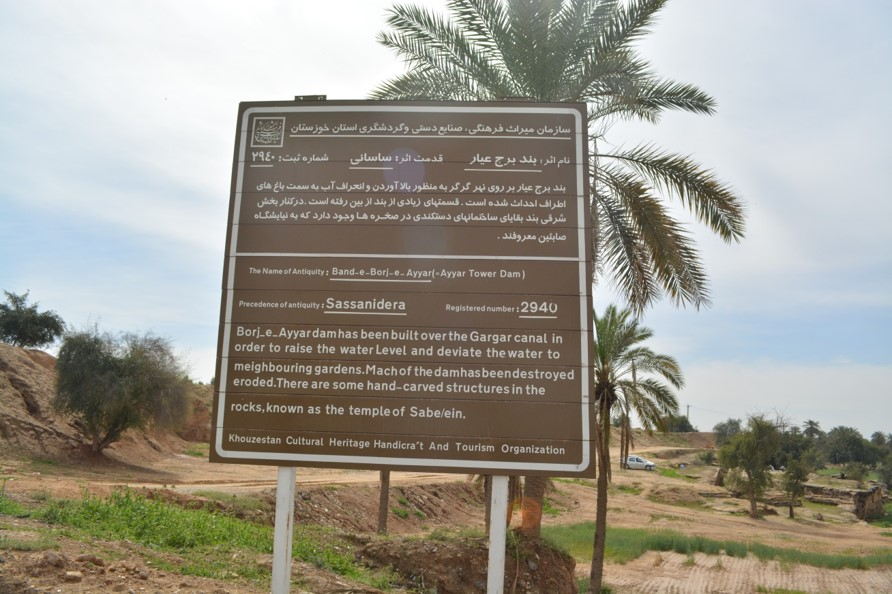
A sign erected by the Khuzestan Cultural Heritage Handicraft and Tourism Organization: "Borj-e-Ayyar Dam has been built over the Gargar Canal in order to raise the water level and deviate the water to neighbouring gardens. Much of the dam has been destroyed and eroded. There are some hand-carved structures in the rocks, known as the temple of Sabe'ein."

Gargar River (Persian: رود گرگر) is a man-made canal which is a world heritage site and a part of Shushtar Historical Hydraulic System, located in the island city Shushtar, Khuzestan province, Iran from the Sasanian era. Gargar River was registered on UNESCO's list of World Heritage Sites in 2009 and is Iran's 10th cultural heritage site to be registered on the United Nations' list together with the 12 other historical bridges, dams, canals, watermills and buildings as Shushtar Historical Hydraulic System.
