= Sash (disambiguation) =

A sash is a large and usually colorful ribbon or band of material worn around the body.

Sash may also refer to:

== People ==
- Cecily Sash (1924–2019), South African painter and professor
- Leon Sash (1922–1979), American jazz accordionist
- Tyler Sash (1988–2015), American football defensive back

== Arts and entertainment ==
- "The Sash", a ballad from Ireland commemorating the victory of King William III in the Williamite war in Ireland in 1690–1691
- Sash!, a German DJ/producer team
- Sash Lilac, one of the three protagonists from the Freedom Planet video game series
- Sash, a sloth in The Croods: A New Age, voiced by James Ryan

== Other uses ==
- Sash, a movable panel in a sash window
- Stand-alone shell, a Unix shell designed for use in recovering from certain types of system failures
- Society for the Advancement of Sexual Health (SASH), foundation dedicated to helping those who suffer from sexual addiction; formerly the National Council on Sexual Addiction & Compulsivity
- Spring Axis Struts and Hibernate (SASH), a combination (stack) of open-source Java components identified by their initials: Spring Framework, Apache Axis, Apache Struts, and Hibernate
- Sash, Texas, a small community in Fannin County
