= Shush-e Sofla =

Shush-e Sofla شوش سفلی
- Village
- Location within Iran
- Coordinates: 30°18′57″N 51°12′32″E
- Country: Iran
- Province: Kohgiluyeh and Boyer-Ahmad
- County: Basht
- Bakhsh: Basht
- Rural District: Babuyi

Population (2006)
  - Total: 133
- Time zone: UTC+3:30 (IRST)
  - Summer (DST): UTC+4:30 (IRDT)

Shush-e Sofla (Persian: شوش سفلی, also Romanized as Shūsh-e Soflá; also known as Shūsht-e Pā’īn and Shūsht-e Soflá) is a village in Babuyi Rural District, Basht District, Basht County, Kohgiluyeh and Boyer-Ahmad Province, Iran. At the 2006 census, its population was 133, in 26 families.
