= Shush-e Olya =

Shush-e Olya شوش علیا
- Village
- Location within Iran
- Coordinates: 30°19′01″N 51°13′11″E
- Country: Iran
- Province: Kohgiluyeh and Boyer-Ahmad
- County: Basht
- Bakhsh: Basht
- Rural District: Babuyi

Population (2006)
  - Total: 245
- Time zone: UTC+3:30 (IRST)
  - Summer (DST): UTC+4:30 (IRDT)

Shush-e Olya (Persian: شوش علیا, also Romanized as Shūsh-e ‘Olyā; also known as Shūsh, Shūsht-e Bālā, Shūsht-e ‘Olyā, and Sūsh) is a village in Babuyi Rural District, Basht District, Basht County, Kohgiluyeh and Boyer-Ahmad Province, Iran. At the 2006 census, its population was 245, in 43 families.
