= Shoushtar =

City in Khuzestan province, Iran

Shoushtar Persian: شوشتر
- City
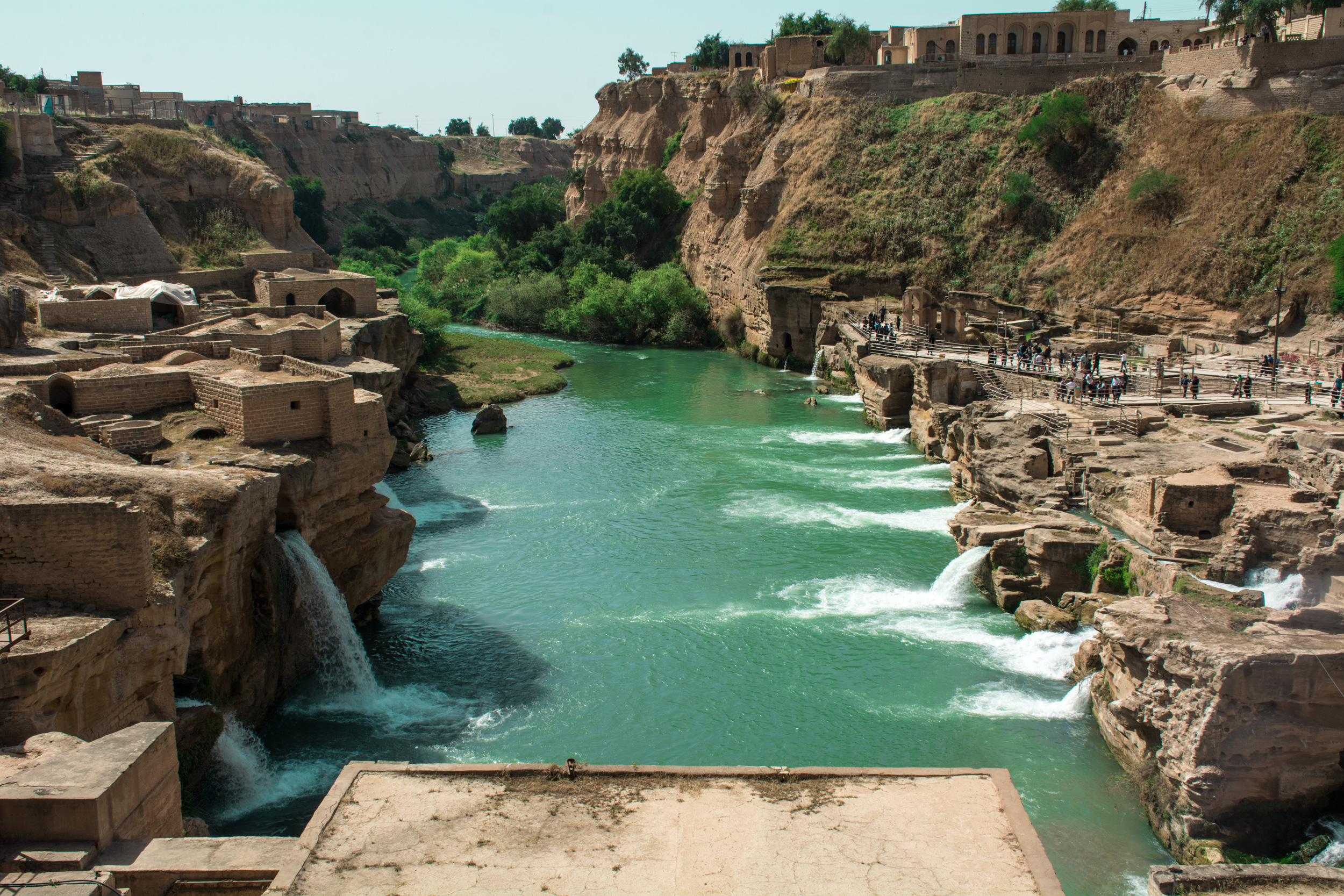
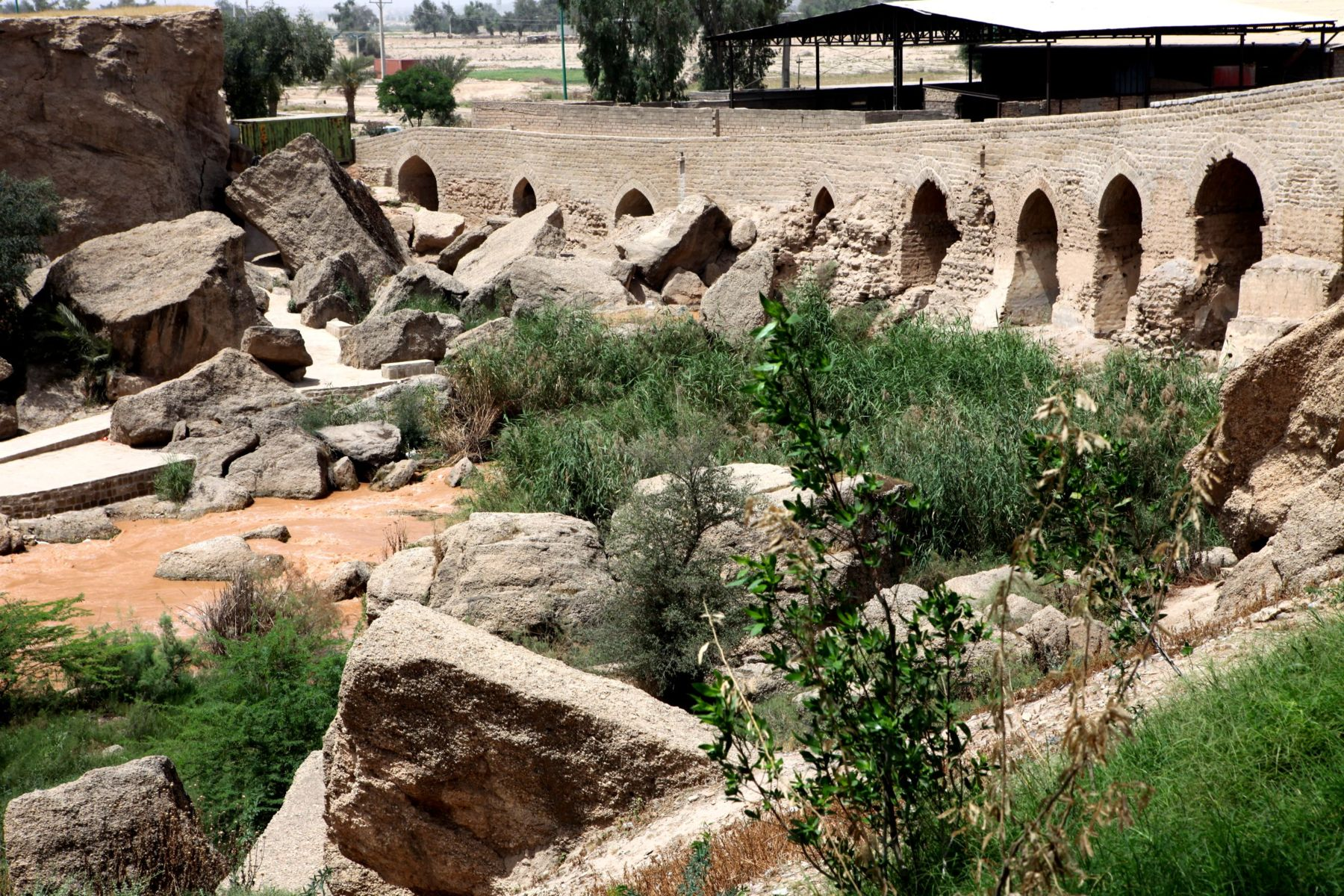
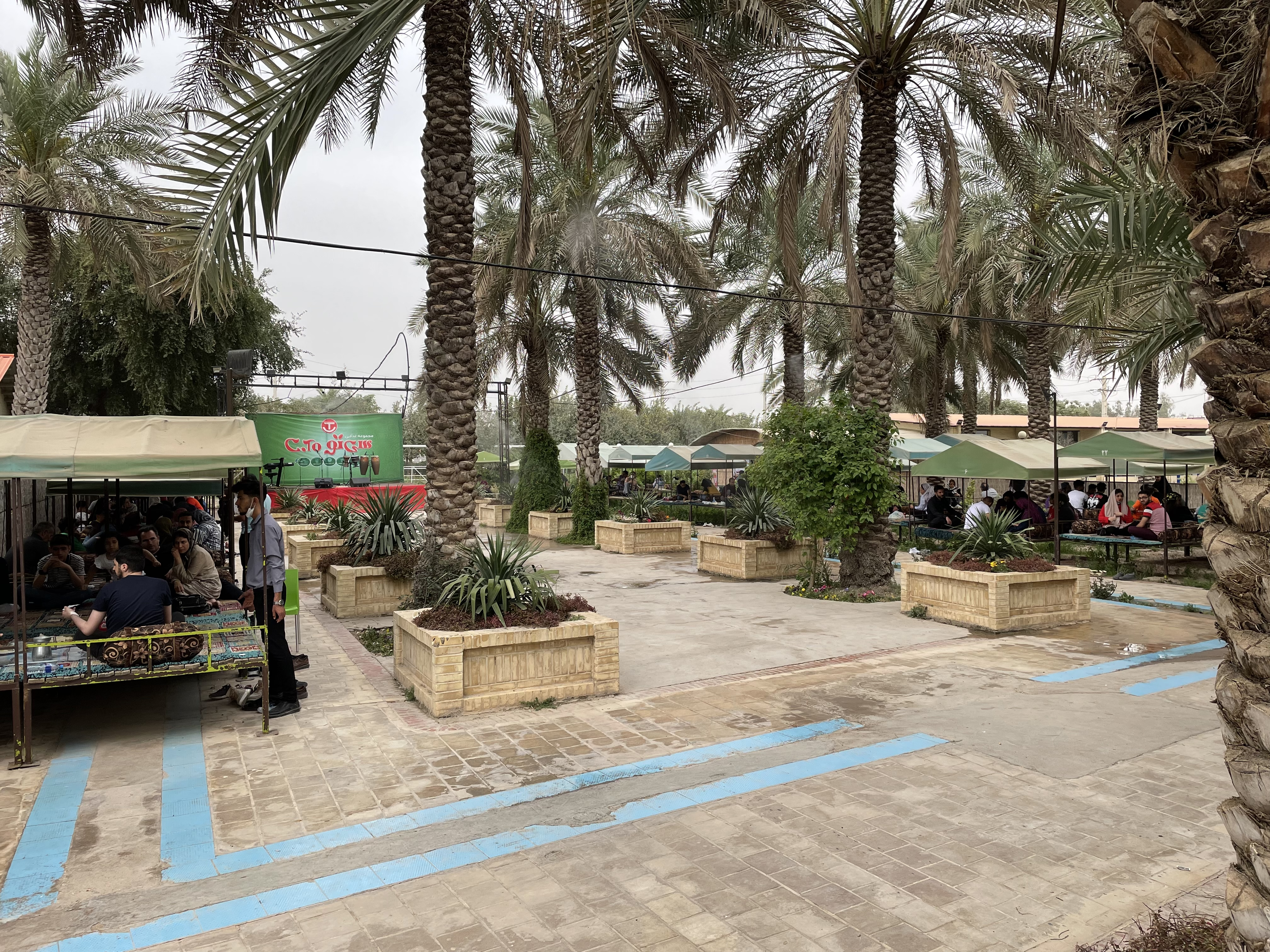

- Location within Iran
- Coordinates: 32°02′42″N 48°51′34″E
- Country: Iran
- Province: Khuzestan
- County: Shoushtar
- District: Central

Population (2016)
  - Total: 101,878
- Time zone: UTC+3:30 (IRST)

Shoushtar (Persian: شوشتر, romanized: Shūshtar) (Note: Also romanized as Shooshtar, Shūshtar, and Shūstar) is a city in the Central District of Shoushtar County, Khuzestan province, Iran, serving as capital of both the county and the district.

Shoushtar is an ancient fortress city, approximately 92 kilometres (57 mi) from Ahvaz, the centre of the province. Much of its past agricultural productivity derives from the irrigation system which centered on the Band-e Kaisar, the first dam bridge in Iran. The whole water system in Shoushtar consists of 13 sites called Shoushtar Historical Hydraulic System which is registered as a Unesco World Heritage Site.

== History ==
In the Elamite times Shoushtar was known as Adamdun. In the Achaemenid era its name was Šurkutir. According to tradition, Shoushtar was founded by the legendary king Hushang after he built Susa (aka Shoush), and the name "Shoushtar" was a comparative form meaning "more beautiful than Shoush". Josef Marquart also interpreted the name Shoushtar as being derived from Shoush, but with a slightly different meaning, with the suffix "-tar" indicating a direction. The Arabic name of the city, Tustar, is an adaptation of the Persian form Shoushtar.

Shoushtar may be the "Sostra" mentioned by Pliny the Elder. It is also known in Syriac literature as a Nestorian bishopric.

During the Sasanian era, it was an island city on the Karun river and selected to become the summer capital. The river was channeled to form a moat around the city, while bridges and main gates into Shoushtar were built to the east, west, and south. Several rivers nearby are conducive to the extension of agriculture; the cultivation of sugar cane, the main crop, dates back to 226. A system of subterranean channels called Qanats, which connected the river to the private reservoirs of houses and buildings, supplied water for domestic use and irrigation, as well as to store and supply water during times of war when the main gates were closed. Traces of these ghanats can still be found in the crypts of some houses.

Under the caliphate, Shoushtar was the capital of one of the seven kuwar (sub-provinces) that made up Khuzestan. Its kurah likely encompassed the eastern edge of the northern Khuzestan plain. Today, this area is inhabited by semi-nomadic people, and only lightly, which possibly explains why al-Maqdisi wrote that he "[knew] no towns" that were dependencies of Shoushtar.

Historically, Shoushtar was always one of the most important textile-producing cities in Khuzestan. Authors throughout the Middle Ages consistently listed a diverse array of textile products manufactured at Shoushtar. For example, al-Istakhri (writing c. 933) listed dibaj (brocade) and tiraz; al-Maqdisi (writing c. 1000) listed dibaj, anmat (carpets), cotton, and Merv-style clothes; and Hafiz-i Abru (writing c. 1430) recorded dibaj, tiraz, and harir (silk). Shoushtar's commercial importance was recognized by its being chosen to produce the Kiswah (the embroidered covering for the Kaaba) in 933, a major honor with political importance.

According to al-Maqdisi's account, there was a cemetery right in the middle of Shoushtar. Nanette Marie Pyne says that this is "not as unusual a phenomenon as it sounds: cemeteries in this part of Iran are often placed on the highest ground, in some places to avoid the raised water table, in others to avoid taking cultivable land out of production." In the case of Shoushtar, the highest ground would have been in the middle of the city, on top of the settlement mound formed by Parthian and Sasanian occupation. Al-Maqdisi also describes that Shoushtar's mosque was located "in the middle of the markets in the cloth merchants' area." A second cloth market was located by the city gate. The cloth fullers' area was located by the bridge, which was nearby.

Al-Maqdisi described Shoushtar as being surrounded by orchards including date palms, grapes, and citrons. An alternate manuscript also lists "fine pomegranates" and "superior pears".

Ibn Battuta visited, noting "On both banks of the river, there are orchards and water-wheels, the river itself is deep and over it, leading to the travelers' gate, there is a bridge upon boats."

The ancient fortress walls were destroyed at the end of the Safavid era.

=== 1831 cholera epidemic ===
In 1831, a cholera epidemic ravaged Shoushtar, killing about half of the city's inhabitants. The Mandaean community was hit particularly hard during the Plague of Shoushtar, as all of their priests had died in the plague. Yahya Bihram, the surviving son of a deceased priest, went on to revive the Mandaean priesthood in Shoushtar.

=== Late 1800s to present ===
Shoushtar benefited from the Karun steamship service established in 1887. It was the farthest point upstream that the boats went, and goods had to be unloaded here and sent overland by caravan. It developed into the main commercial center in southwestern Iran, and by 1938 it had 28,000 residents. During the early 20th century, the city suffered from unrest between its Haydari and Ne'mati factions. The typical Haydari-Ne'mati rivalry also took on a political dimension in Shoushtar, since the Haydaris were pro-Arab and pro-monarchy while the Ne'matis were pro-Bakhtiyari and pro-constitutionalist.

With the completion of the Trans-Persian Railway, Shoushtar began to decline. The railway bypassed Shoushtar in favor of Ahvaz, which took over Shoushtar's commercial importance, and Shoushtar's population decreased.

=== Band-e Kaisar ===
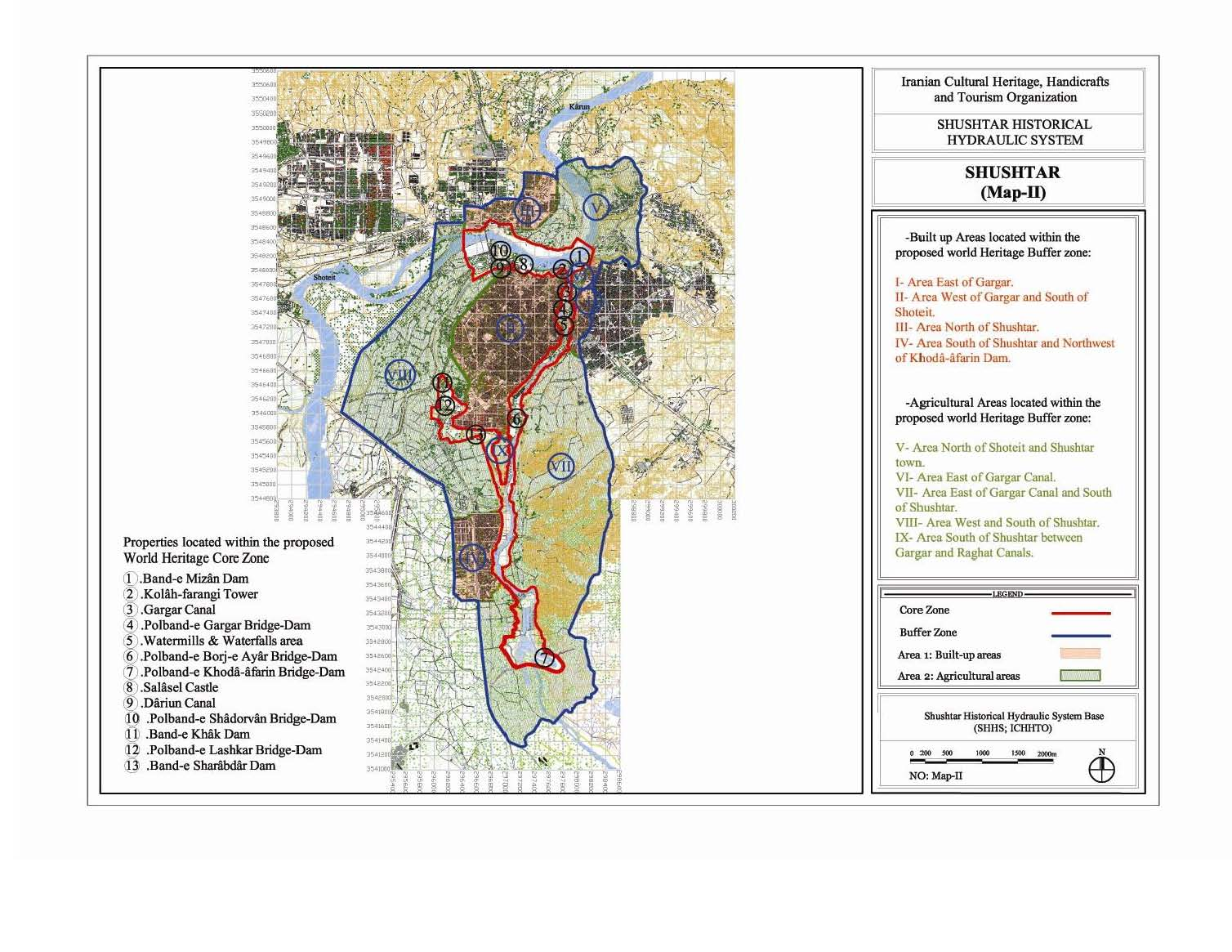
Map of the Shoushtar Historical Hydraulic System

The Band-e Kaisar ("Caesar's dam") is believed by some to be a Roman built arch bridge [since Roman captured soldiers were used in its construction], and the first in the country to combine it with a dam. When the Sassanian Shah Shapur I defeated the Roman emperor Valerian, he is said to have ordered the captive Roman soldiers to build a large bridge and dam stretching over 500 metres. Lying deep in Persian territory, the structure which exhibits typical Roman building techniques became the most eastern Roman bridge and Roman dam. Its dual-purpose design exerted a profound influence on Iranian civil engineering and was instrumental in developing Sassanid water management techniques. While the traditional account is disputable, it's not implausible that Roman prisoners of war were involved in its construction.

The approximately 500 m long overflow dam over the Karun, Iran's most effluent river, was the core structure of the Shoushtar Historical Hydraulic System, a large irrigation complex from which Shoushtar derived its agricultural productivity, and which has been designated World Heritage Site by the UNESCO in 2009. The arched superstructure carried across the important road between Pasargadae and the Sasanian capital Ctesiphon. Many times repaired in the Islamic period, the dam bridge fell out of use in the late 19th century, leading to the degeneration of the complex system of irrigation.

== Registration of ancient works in UNESCO World Heritage ==
Ancient works of Shoushtar, which were registered at the annual meeting of the UNESCO World Heritage Committee on 26 June 2009, under the title of Shoushtar Historical Water System, as the tenth work of Iran in the UNESCO World Heritage List with number 1315.

== Demographics ==
=== Ethnicity ===
Historically, the Subbi Kush neighborhood of Shoushtar was home to a Mandaean community for centuries, although Mandaeans no longer lived there by the 21st century due to emigration. One of Shoushtar's best-known Mandaean priests was Ram Zihrun. The overwhelming majority of people of Shoushtar are of a native hybrid race that there is no name to address them. Layard and Selby write about the people of Shoushtar that most of the people of Shoushtar are Sadati who wear large green turbans.Elsewhere, Lord Curzon says this about the people of Shoushtar: They (the Shoushtris) are a mixture of Persian and Arab descent and are considered a link between these two descents, and while the Arab gene seems to be stronger in them, it seems that they have acquired most of the lighter moral characteristics of both races. According to Henry Field, Shoushtri are usually thought to be Assyrian, but their origin is mixed and they are called Shoushtri. And in another place, she writes that the cities of Shoushtar and Dezful have a population whose origin is unknown and they may be of the ancient Assyrian race who have mixed with Iranians.

=== Language ===
The majority of the cities' population are Persians who speak Shoushtari, a dialect of the Persian language. The list of linguists has classified Shoushtri-Dezfuli dialect independently from Persian.

=== Population ===
At the time of the 2006 National Census, the city's population was 94,124 in 21,511 households. The following census in 2011 counted 106,815 people in 26,639 households. The 2016 census measured the population of the city as 101,878 people in 28,373 households.

== Culture ==
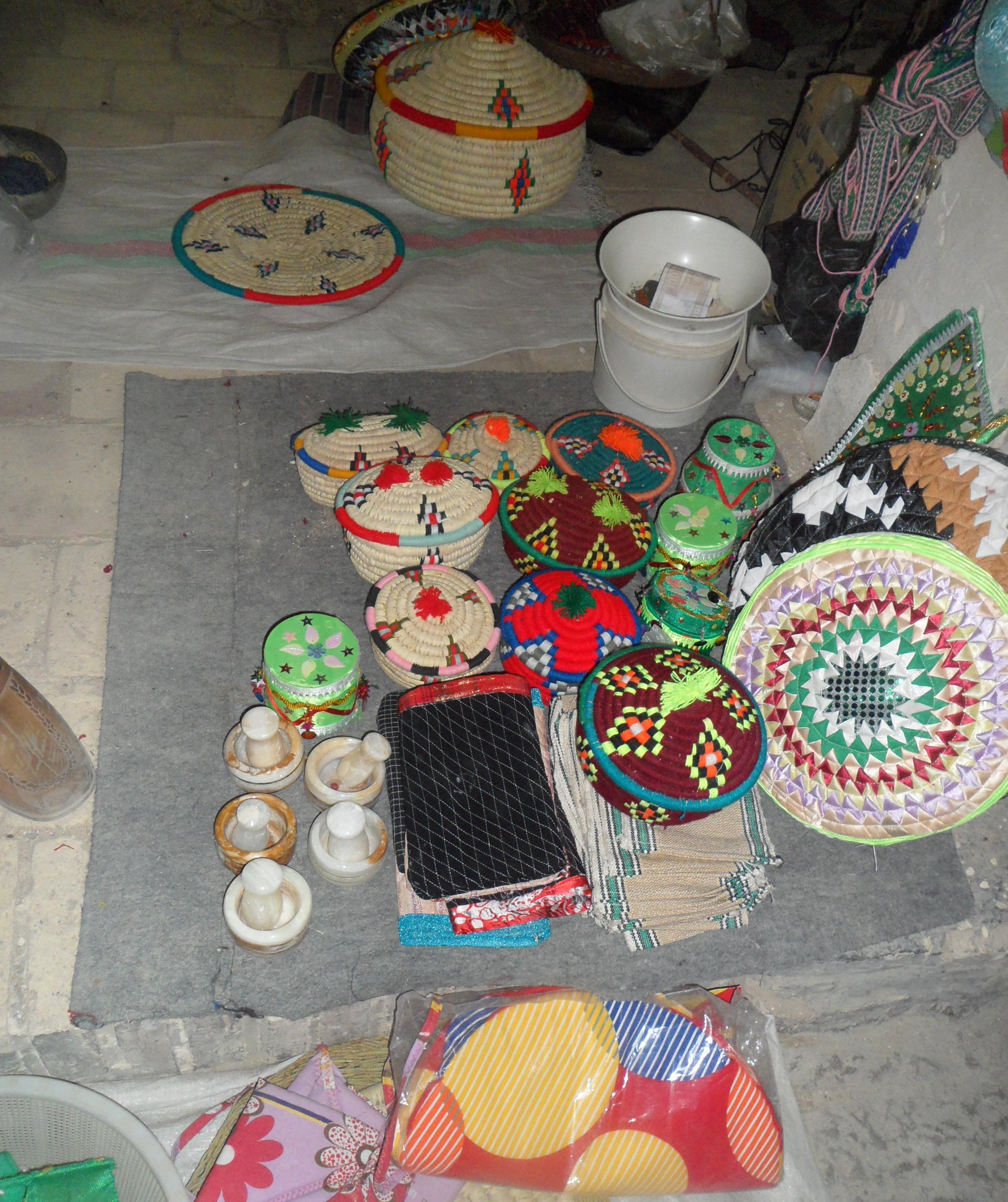
Shoushtar handicrafts

The devoutness of Shoushtar's people has led to it being nicknamed "Dar al-Mu'minin".

Local tradition attributes certain customs to ancient Roman colonists, as well as the construction of the Band-e Kaisar and the introduction of brocade manufacturing technique.

== Climate ==
Shoushtar has a hot semi-arid climate (Köppen climate classification BSh) with extremely hot summers and mild winters. Frost does occasionally occur at night during winter, but winters in Shoushtar have no snow. Rainfall is higher than most of southern Iran, but is almost exclusively confined to the period from November to April.

Climate data for Shushtar (1994-2005 normals and records)
Month	Jan	Feb	Mar	Apr	May	Jun	Jul	Aug	Sep	Oct	Nov	Dec	Year
Record high °C (°F)	24.8 (76.6)	30.8 (87.4)	35.0 (95.0)	41.6 (106.9)	48.0 (118.4)	51.6 (124.9)	51.8 (125.2)	51.6 (124.9)	48.8 (119.8)	42.8 (109.0)	34.8 (94.6)	29.6 (85.3)	51.8 (125.2)
Mean daily maximum °C (°F)	17.7 (63.9)	20.4 (68.7)	25.0 (77.0)	32.2 (90.0)	39.7 (103.5)	44.6 (112.3)	46.3 (115.3)	46.0 (114.8)	41.8 (107.2)	35.6 (96.1)	26.2 (79.2)	19.8 (67.6)	32.9 (91.3)
Daily mean °C (°F)	13.6 (56.5)	15.4 (59.7)	19.4 (66.9)	25.9 (78.6)	32.4 (90.3)	36.5 (97.7)	38.6 (101.5)	38.2 (100.8)	34.1 (93.4)	29.0 (84.2)	20.7 (69.3)	15.5 (59.9)	26.6 (79.9)
Record low °C (°F)	1.2 (34.2)	−0.2 (31.6)	3.6 (38.5)	7.8 (46.0)	17.2 (63.0)	21.4 (70.5)	20.2 (68.4)	24.0 (75.2)	19.8 (67.6)	11.8 (53.2)	3.4 (38.1)	1.8 (35.2)	−0.2 (31.6)
Average precipitation mm (inches)	92.5 (3.64)	32.3 (1.27)	58.6 (2.31)	16.6 (0.65)	2.5 (0.10)	0.1 (0.00)	0.0 (0.0)	0.0 (0.0)	0.0 (0.0)	2.0 (0.08)	46.3 (1.82)	70.5 (2.78)	321.4 (12.65)
Average relative humidity (%)	71	58	48	35	22	17	19	21	21	27	45	67	38
Mean monthly sunshine hours	175.5	203.8	225.0	240.8	308.5	348.0	339.5	341.5	312.1	269.8	206.2	169.0	3,139.7
Source: IRIMO, (records), (humidity), (precipitation), (sun)

== Notable people ==
- Sayyed Bozorg Mahmoody, anesthesiologist accused of taking his American wife Betty and their daughter Mahtob to Iran and allegedly keeping them hostage
- Mohammad Ali Mousavi Jazayeri, Twelver Shia cleric
- Mohammad-Ali Emam-Shooshtari, historian and religious scholar
- Sahl Shoushtari, early classical Sufi mystic
- Qazi Nurullah Shoustari, eminent Shia faqih (jurist) and scholar
- Nematollah Jazayeri, prominent Shia scholar
- Mohammad-Taqi Shoushtari, Iranian Twelver Shia scholar
- Sheikh Jafar Shooshtari, prominent Shia scholar

== See also ==
- Sahl al-Tustari, a medieval Islamic scholar and early Sufi mystic born in Shoushtar
- Sheikh Jafar Shooshtari, a prominent Shia scholar
- Sohrab Gilani, the representative of Shoushtar in Majles

Media related to Shushtar at Wikimedia Commons

== Sources ==
- Hartung, Fritz; Kuros, Gh. R. (1987), "Historische Talsperren im Iran", in Garbrecht, Günther (ed.), Historische Talsperren, vol. 1, Stuttgart: Verlag Konrad Wittwer, pp. 221–274, ISBN 3-87919-145-X
- Hodge, A. Trevor (1992), Roman Aqueducts & Water Supply, London: Duckworth, p. 85, ISBN 0-7156-2194-7
- Hodge, A. Trevor (2000), "Reservoirs and Dams", in Wikander, Örjan (ed.), Handbook of Ancient Water Technology, Technology and Change in History, vol. 2, Leiden: Brill, pp. 331–339 (337f.), ISBN 90-04-11123-9
- Huff, Dietrich (2010), "Bridges. Pre-Islamic Bridges", in Yarshater, Ehsan (ed.), Encyclopædia Iranica Online
- Kleiss, Wolfram (1983), "Brückenkonstruktionen in Iran", Architectura, 13: 105–112 (106)
- Kramers, J. H. (2010), "Shushtar", in Bearman, P. (ed.), Encyclopaedia of Islam (2nd ed.), Brill Online
- O'Connor, Colin (1993), Roman Bridges, Cambridge University Press, p. 130 (No. E42), ISBN 0-521-39326-4
- Schnitter, Niklaus (1978), "Römische Talsperren", Antike Welt, 8 (2): 25–32 (32)
- Smith, Norman (1971), A History of Dams, London: Peter Davies, pp. 56–61, ISBN 0-432-15090-0
- Vogel, Alexius (1987), "Die historische Entwicklung der Gewichtsmauer", in Garbrecht, Günther (ed.), Historische Talsperren, vol. 1, Stuttgart: Verlag Konrad Wittwer, pp. 47–56 (50), ISBN 3-87919-145-X
