= Alma Rišaia Zuṭa =

Religious text of Mandaeism

Information
- Religion: Mandaeism
- Language: Mandaic language

Alma Rišaia Zuṭa (Classical Mandaic: ࡀࡋࡌࡀ ࡓࡉࡔࡀࡉࡀ ࡆࡅࡈࡀ, "The Smaller Supreme World" or "The Smaller First World") is a Mandaean religious text. The text is used for Mandaean priestly initiation ceremonies. It is written as a scroll. Alma Rišaia Zuṭa complements Alma Rišaia Rba, or "The Greater Supreme World", a related Mandaic text used for priestly rituals.

== Manuscripts and translations ==
An English translation of the text was published by E. S. Drower in 1963, which was based on manuscript 48 of the Drower Collection (abbreviated DC 48). It was copied in 972 A.H. (1564 or 1565 A.D.). Since the first part of the scroll is missing, the content of DC 48 begins in the middle of a dialogue between an initiating priest (rba) and a novice. There are 4 extant parts in the DC 48 manuscript. A typesetted Mandaic version of DC 48 was published by Majid Fandi Al-Mubaraki in 2002.

MS Rbai Rafid Collection 3F (abbreviated MS RRC 3F), copied in 1238 A.H. (1822-1823 A.D.), is a manuscript of Alma Rišaia Zuṭa that was not analyzed by Drower. It was analyzed by Matthew Morgenstern in 2018. The manuscript is part of the Rbai Rafid Collection (RRC), a private collection of Mandaean manuscripts held by the Mandaean priest Rbai Rafid al-Sabti in Nijmegen, Netherlands. The copyist was Iahia Ram Zihrun br Mhatam br Mhatam Iuhana br Bihram br Mašad br Naǰmia br Karam br Kairia br Haiat kinianḥ Sabur.

== Prayer sequence ==
In Alma Rišaia Zuṭa, the prescribed sequence of Qulasta prayers (numbered below according to Drower's 1959 Canonical Prayerbook) to be recited is as follows.

- 63, 3
- 109
- 35, 9
- 65
- 71–72
- 59
- 64
- 80
- 170
- (illustrations and descriptions of other rituals in between)
- 1, 3, 5, 19
- 32–34
- 75–77
- 9
- 35–69
- 91–99
- 70–71
- 101–103
- 63, 3
- 35, 9
- 58
- 65
- 71
- 170
- 6
- 72
- 80
- 2, 4, 6

== See also ==
- Alma Rišaia
- Alma Rišaia Rba
- The Coronation of the Great Shishlam
- Scroll of Exalted Kingship
- The Thousand and Twelve Questions
