= Alma Rišaia Rba =

Religious text of Mandaeism

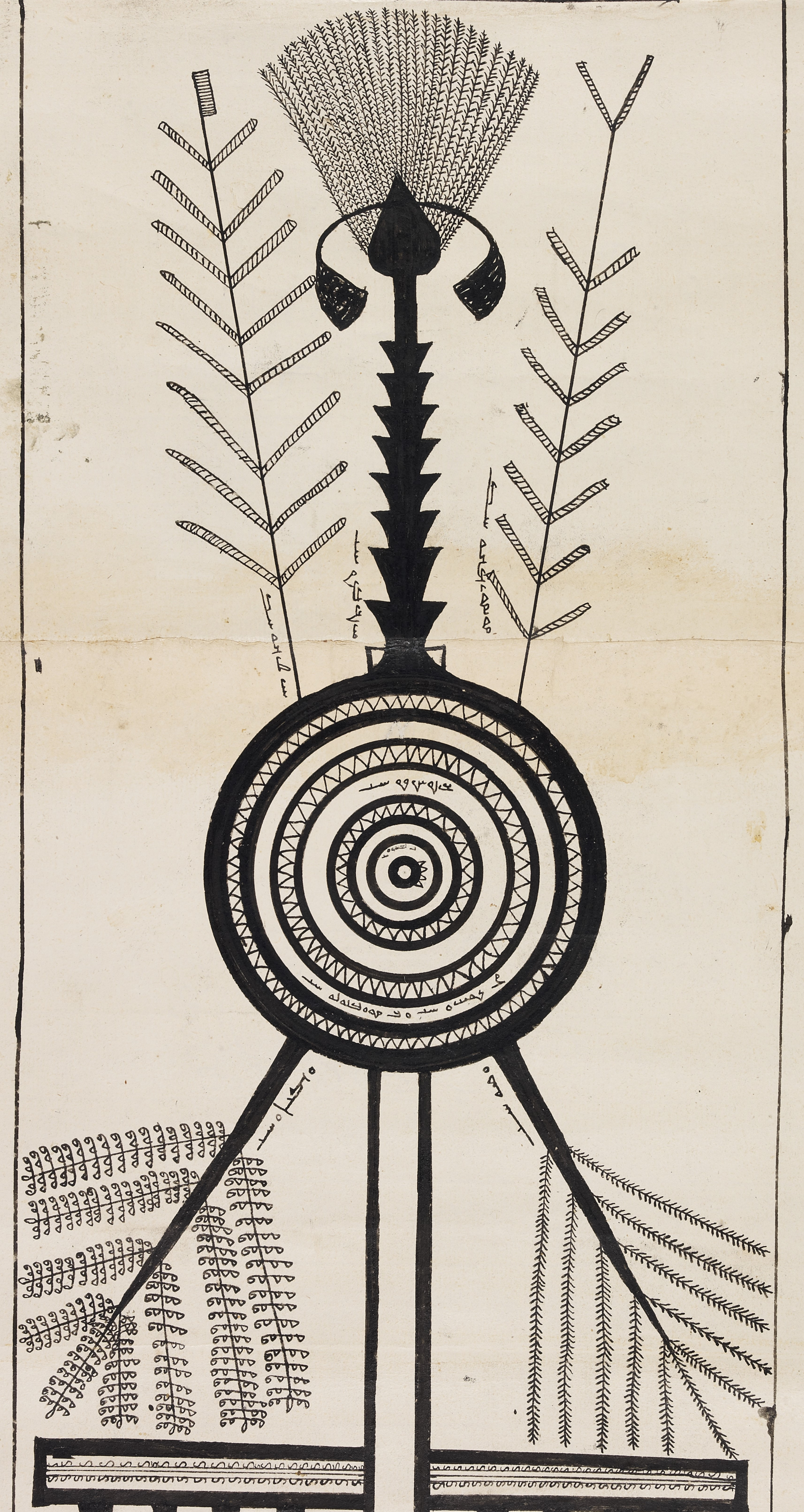
- Five plants sprouting from a wellspring (aina) (DC 41)

Information
- Religion: Mandaeism
- Language: Mandaic language

Alma Rišaia Rba or Diwan Alma Rišaia Rabbā (Classical Mandaic: ࡀࡋࡌࡀ ࡓࡉࡔࡀࡉࡀ ࡓࡁࡀ, "The Great Supreme World" or "The Great First World") is a Mandaean religious text. The text is used for Mandaean priestly initiation ceremonies. It is written as a scroll and has numerous illustrations. Alma Rišaia Rba complements Alma Rišaia Zuṭa, or "The Smaller Supreme World", a related Mandaic text used for priestly rituals.

== Manuscripts and translations ==
An English translation of the text was published by E. S. Drower in 1963, which was based on manuscript 41 of the Drower Collection (abbreviated DC 41). The manuscript consists of 8 parts. It was copied in 1224 A.H. (1809 or 1810 A.D.). The DC 41 manuscript contains an illustration with Qulasta prayer 79 in scrambled form, and the text also has a scrambled version of Qulasta prayer 82 (which is also quoted in the Book 4 of the Right Ginza).

BL Add. 23,602B, titled Kholasta sive liturgica Sabiorum Libri Joannis Fragmenta Mendaice, is a book of fragments that was probably obtained by Colonel John George Taylor. It contains fragments of Maṣbuta ḏ-Hibil Ziua and Alma Rišaia Rba.

Manuscripts of Alma Rišaia Rba held in the Rbai Rafid Collection are RRC 2P and RRC 3D. There are two additional manuscripts that are privately held by Mandaeans in Australia. One of the manuscripts was copied at Suq eš-Šuyūḵ in 1244 A.H. (1828–1829 A.D.), and another manuscript was copied at Qalˤat Ṣāleḥ in 1343 A.H. (1924–1925 A.D.).

== Illustrations ==
DC 41 contains illustrations of various heavenly trees, which are named Haneil, Marmag, Mašqeil, Nahreil, Nahureil, Rahimeil (depicted twice), Samkieil, and Tarwan.

The manuscript also contains an illustration of Adam Kasia labeled with the letters of the Mandaic alphabet. Similarly, the Jewish mystical texts Sefer Yetzirah and the Bahir associate the letters of the Hebrew alphabet with various aspects of the creation of the universe.

Below are the main illustrations in DC 41:

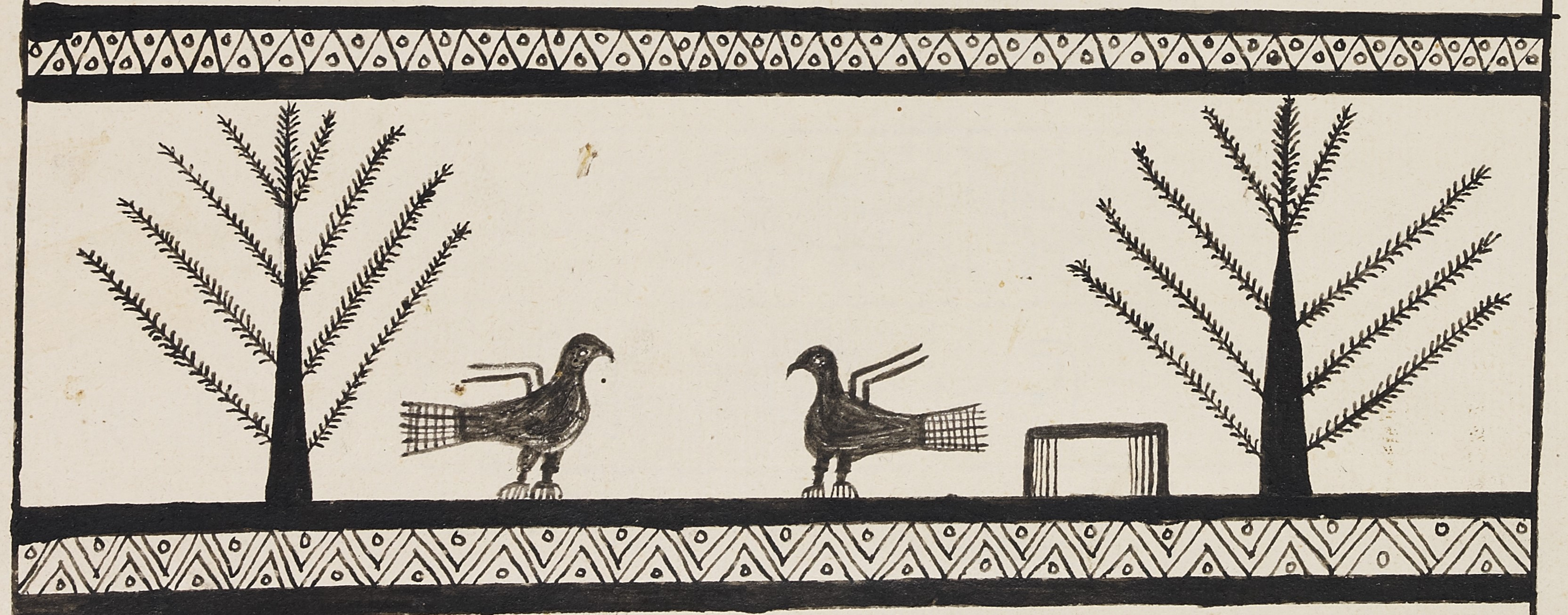
Illustration of two birds and two trees, at the beginning (top) of the scroll

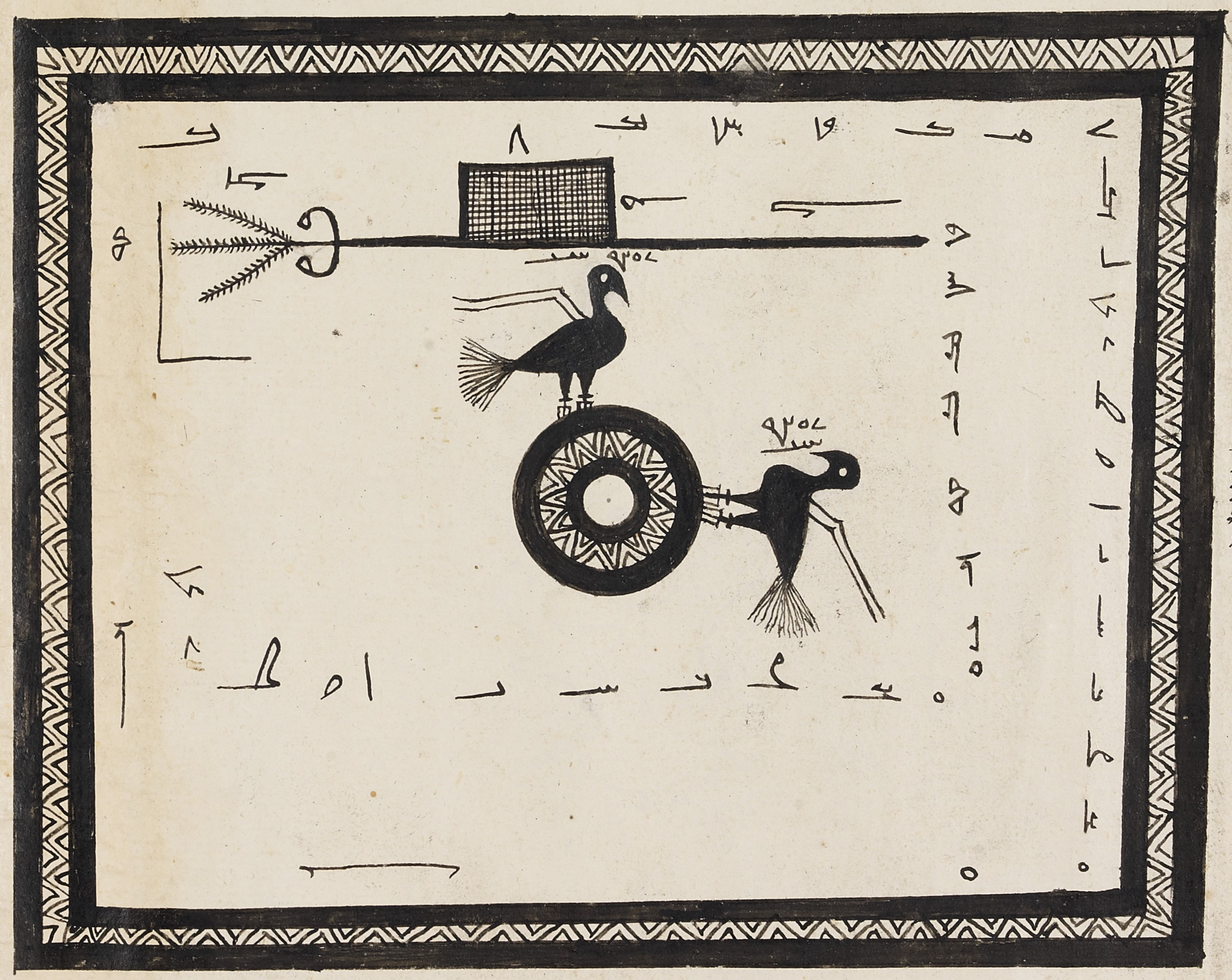
Two doves standing on a wellspring (aina)

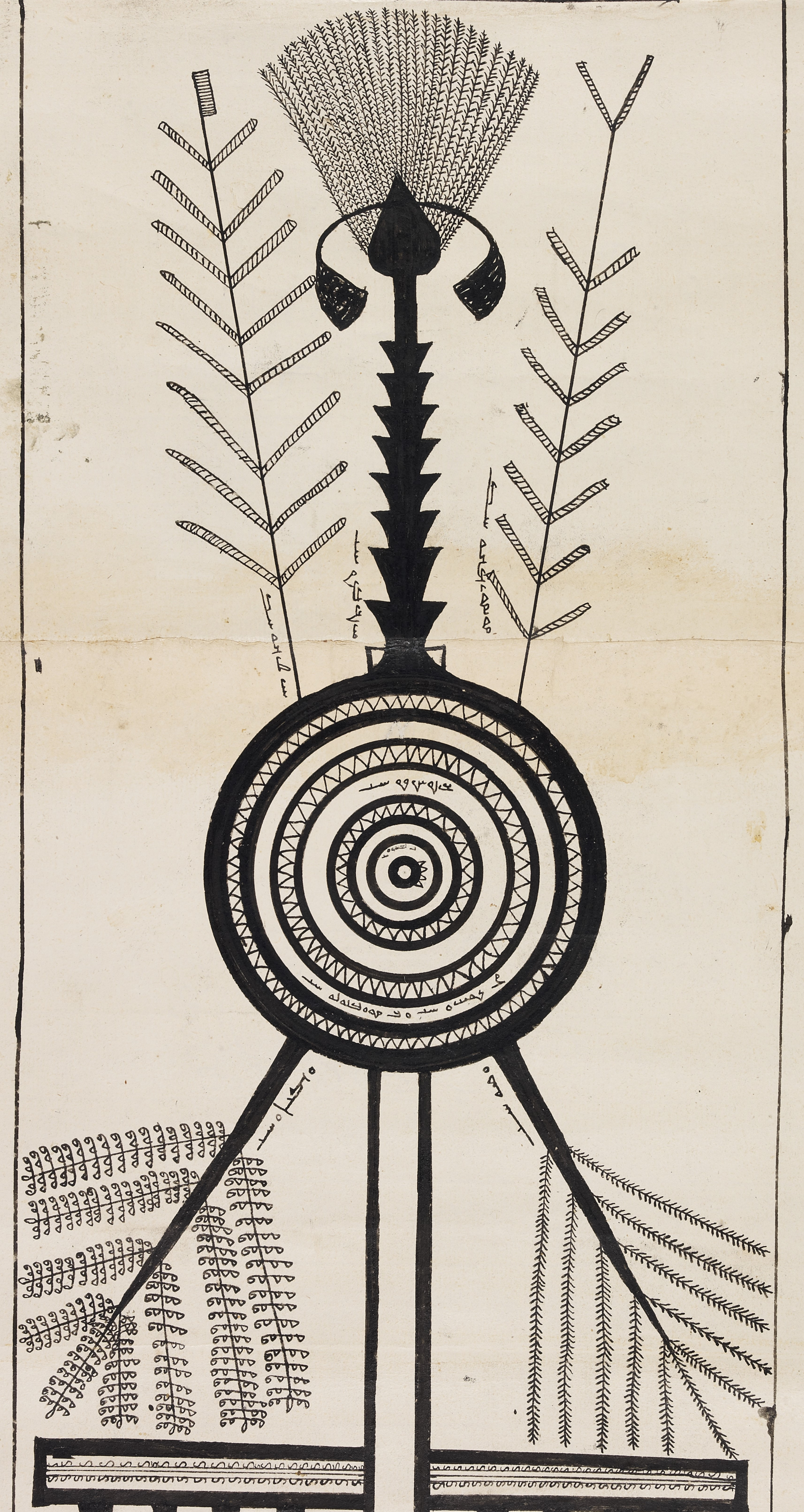
Five plants sprouting from a wellspring (aina)

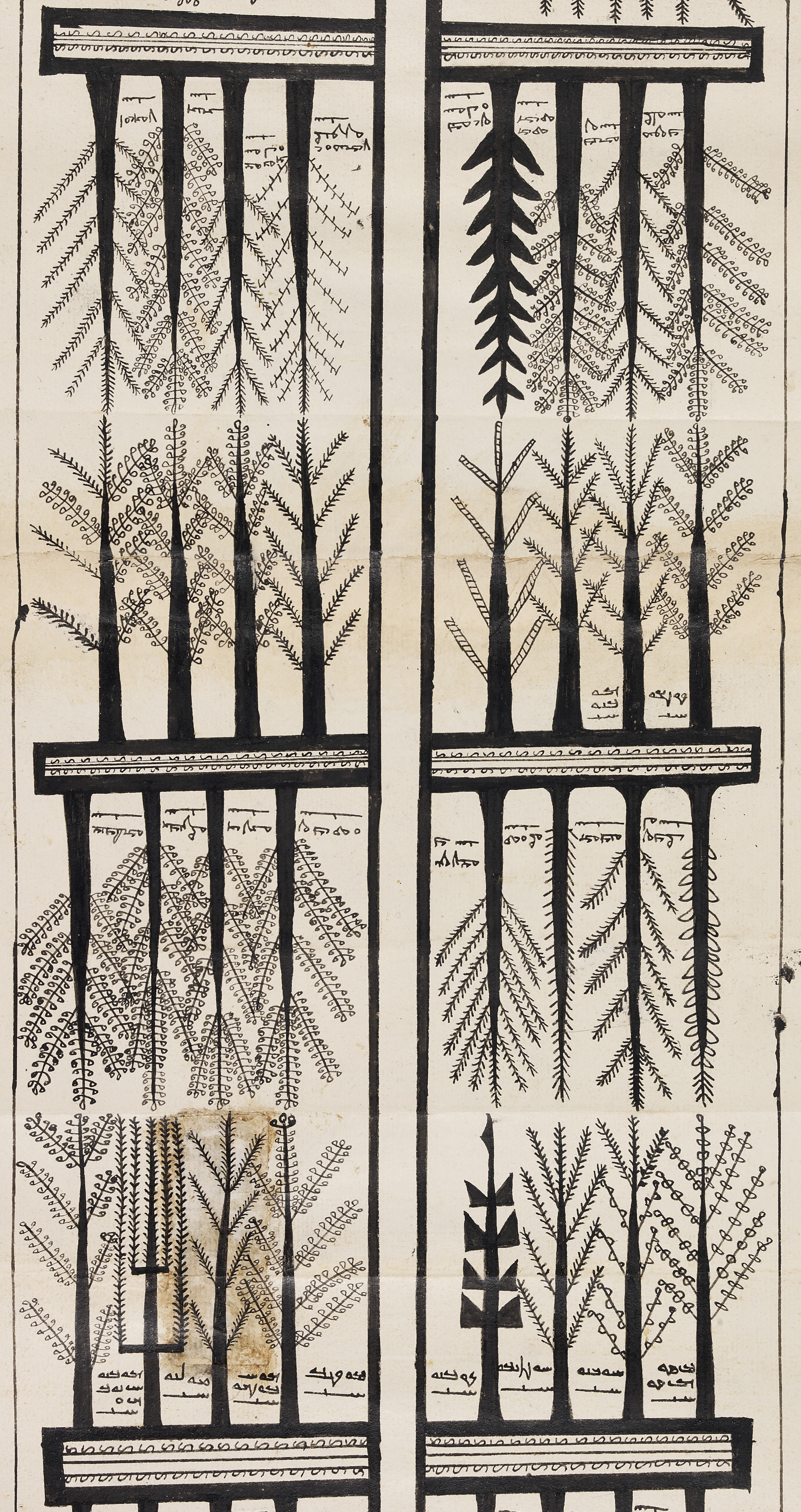
Heavenly garden of plants

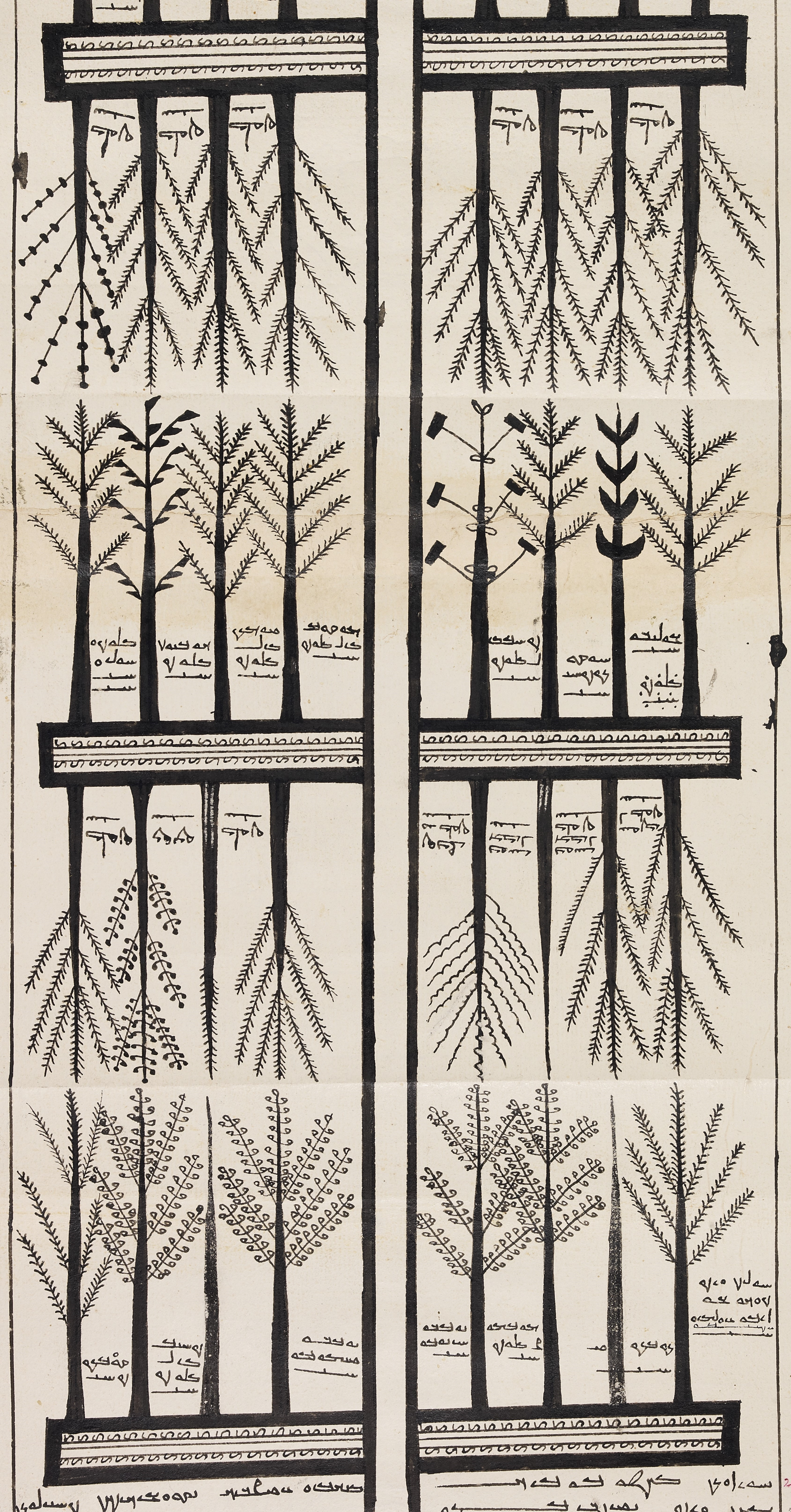
Heavenly garden of plants (continued)

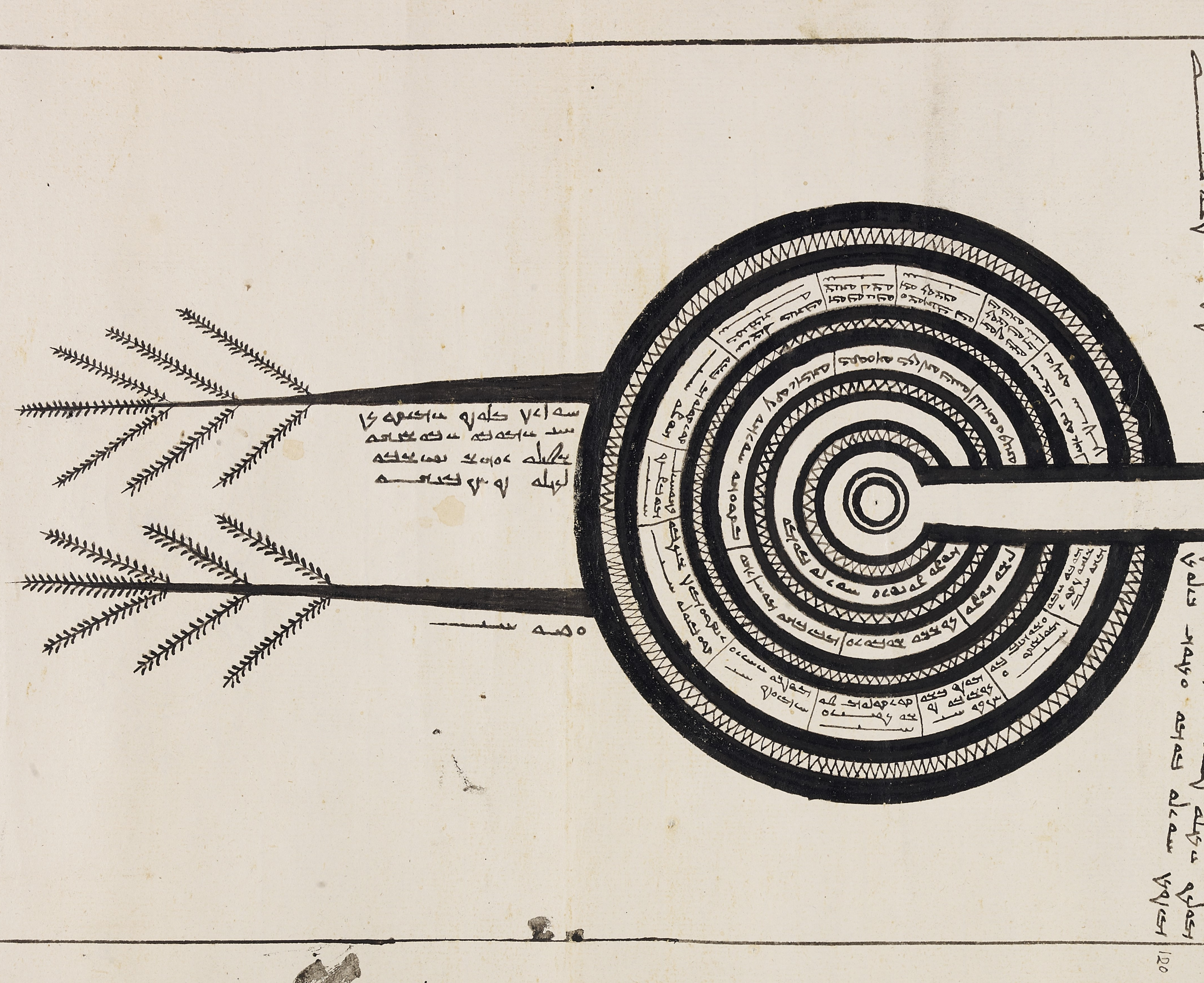
Concentric circles labeled with the names of sacramental clothing and body parts

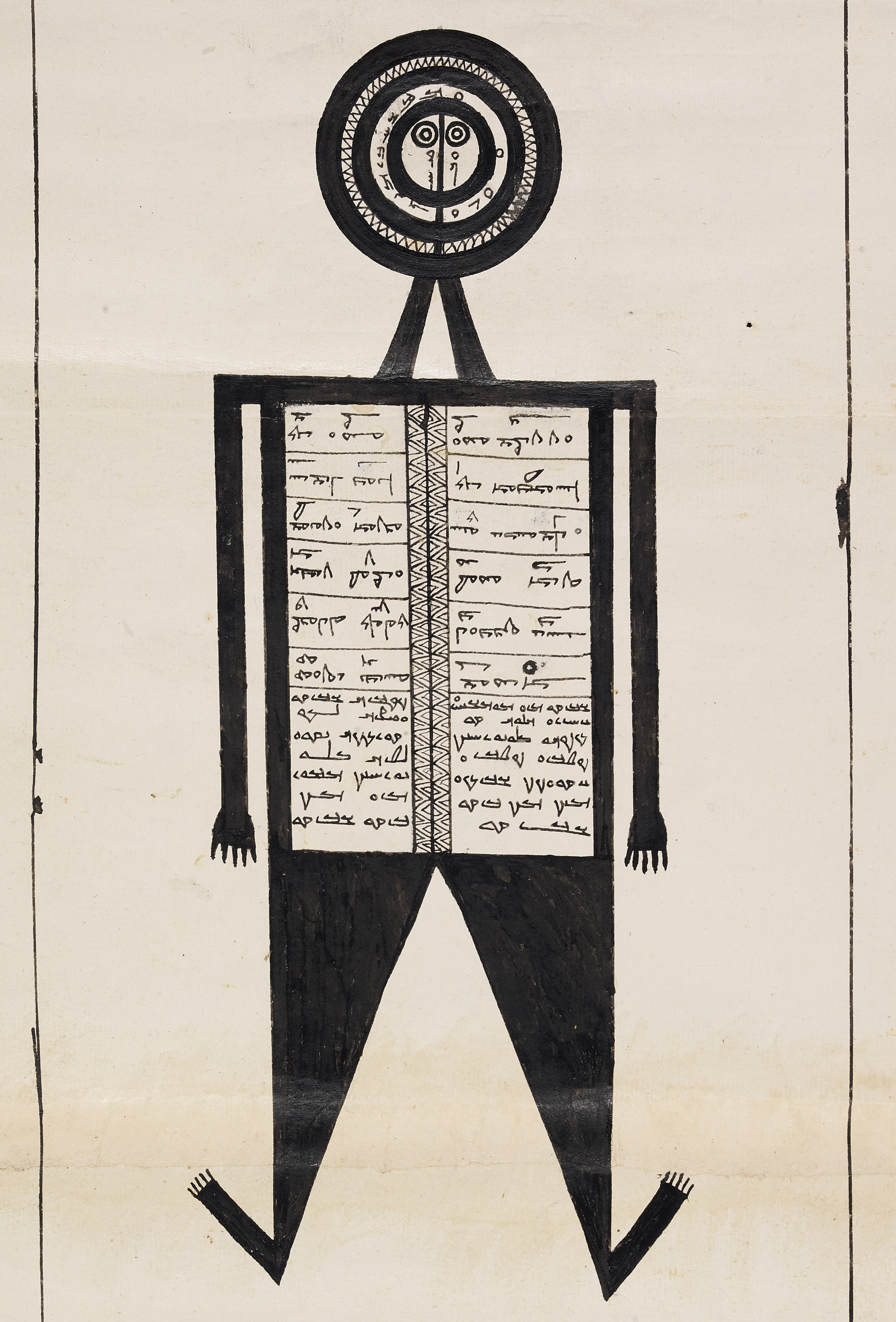
An illustrated figure of Adam Kasia labeled with the letters of the Mandaic alphabet

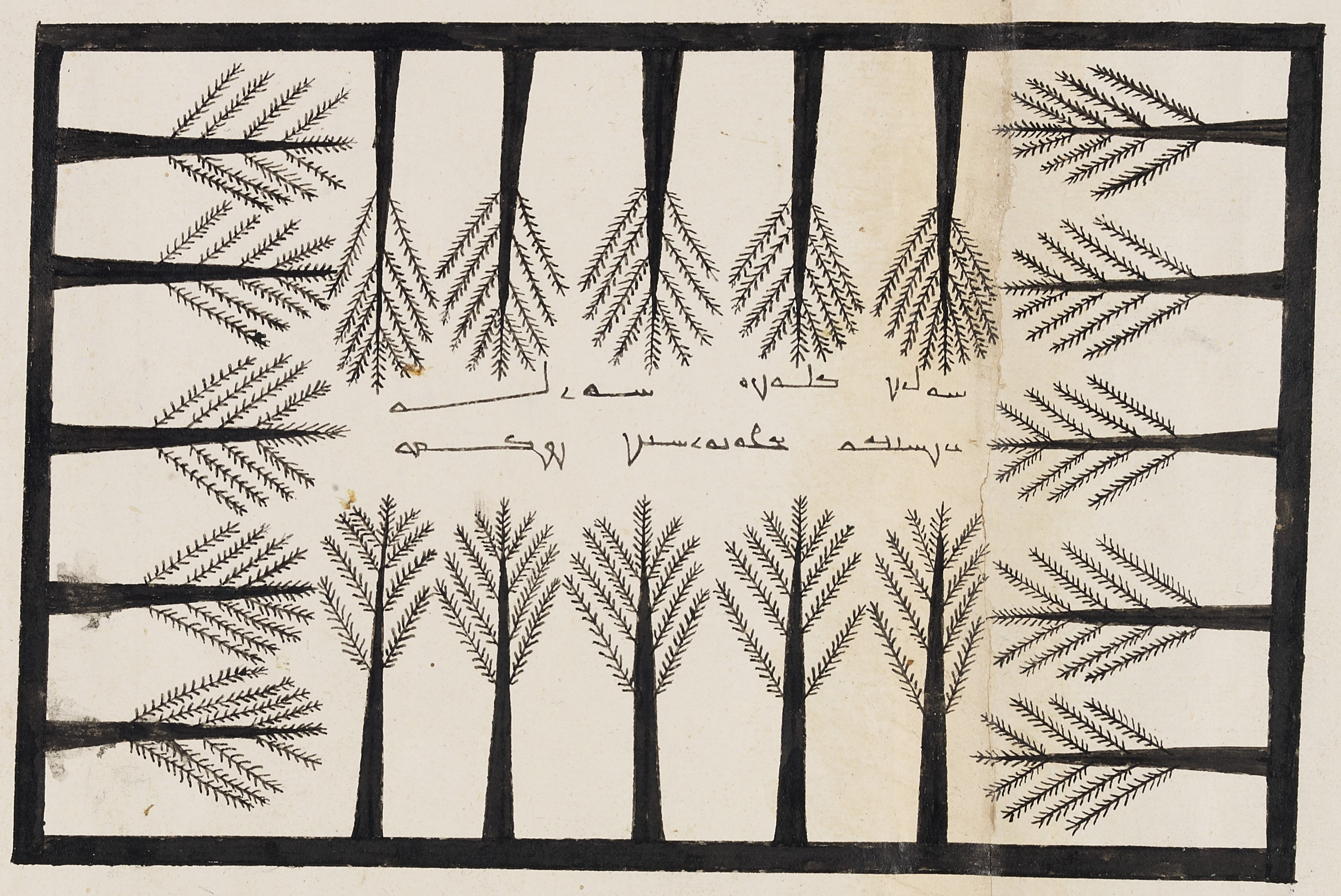
Twenty trees. Translation of the Mandaic text (adapted from Drower 1963): "These are trees; the strength of light is great in them."

== Prayer sequence ==
In Alma Rišaia Rba, the prescribed sequence of Qulasta prayers (numbered below according to Drower's 1959 Canonical Prayerbook) to be recited is as follows.

- 1, 3, 5, 19
- 7
- 33–34
- 75–77
- 9, 35
- 34
- 45–70
- 29
- 71–72
- 91
- 32–34
- 75–77
- 9, 35
- 44–49
- 3
- 50–64, 66–69
- 91–99
- 71
- 100
- 71–72
- 101–103
- 63
- 108
- 3
- 35
- 9
- 58
- 65
- 71
- 170
- 36
- 59–60
- 72
- 80
- 2, 4
- 1, 3, 5, 19
- 32–34
- 75–77
- 9
- 35–70
- 91
- 96
- 79–80
- 33
- 81
- 34
- 1
- 75–77
- 9
- 35–36
- 44–69
- 91–99
- 70
- 102
- 71–72
- 80
- 101–102
- 63
- 58 (?)
- 3
- 35
- 58 (?)
- 65 (?)
- 76
- 170
- 80 (?)
- 178

== See also ==
- Alma Rišaia
- Alma Rišaia Zuṭa
- The Coronation of the Great Shishlam
- Scroll of Exalted Kingship
- The Thousand and Twelve Questions
