= List of Mandaic manuscripts =

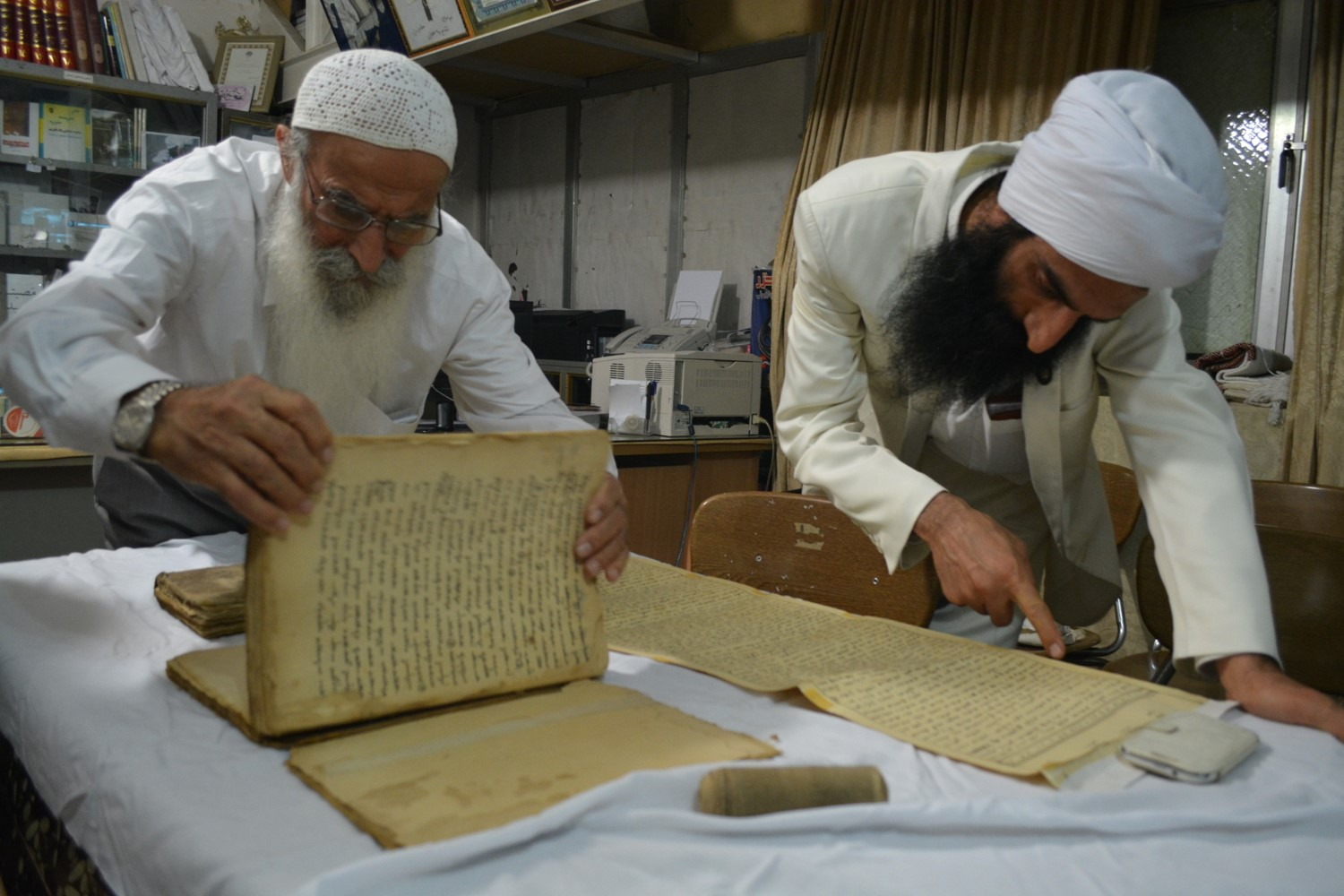
Mandaean priests inspecting Mandaic manuscripts for photographing in Ahvaz, Iran. Salem Choheili is at the left, Tarmida Sam Zahrooni is at the right.

This article contains a list of Mandaic manuscripts, which are almost entirely Mandaean religious texts written in Classical Mandaic.

Well-known Mandaean texts include the Ginza Rabba (also known as the Sidra Rabbā), the Mandaean Book of John, and the Qulasta. Texts for Mandaean priests include The 1012 Questions, among others. Some, like the Ginza Rabba, are codices (bound books), while others, such as the various diwans, are illustrated scrolls.

== Background ==
Mandaean copyists or scribes (Mandaic: sapra) may transcribe texts as a meritorious deed for one's own forgiveness of sins, or they may be hired to copy a text for another person. Mandaean sacred scriptures, such as the Ginza Rabba are traditionally kept in wooden chests wrapped in layers of white cotton and silk cloth. These protected manuscripts are generally not touched by ordinary laypeople, although learned laymen (yalufa) who demonstrate proper knowledge and respect for the manuscripts are usually granted access by priests, similar to the level of respect given to the Guru Granth Sahib in Sikhism. Gloves are worn while handling copies of the Ginza Rabba that are used for liturgical purposes.

== Types ==
Mandaean religious texts can be written in book or codex form (draša ࡃࡓࡀࡔࡀ, sidra ࡎࡉࡃࡓࡀ, or ktaba ࡊࡕࡀࡁࡀ) or as scrolls (diwan ࡃࡉࡅࡀࡍ, šafta ࡔࡀࡐࡕࡀ, or šarḥ ࡔࡀࡓࡇ) that are often illustrated. The illustrations, usually labeled with lengthy written explanations, typically contain abstract geometric drawings of uthras that are reminiscent of cubism or prehistoric rock art.

In Mandaean texts, the end of each chapter or section is typically denoted by the Mandaean letters s—a (ࡎࡀ; also known as saka), which are separated by a long ligature.

Some scrolls are talismans (zrazta ࡆࡓࡀࡆࡕࡀ), amulets (qmaha ࡒࡌࡀࡄࡀ), or exorcisms (pašar ࡐࡀࡔࡀࡓ or pišra ࡐࡉࡔࡓࡀ), all of which are subtypes of phylacteries. Others consist of prayers such as rahmia ࡓࡀࡄࡌࡉࡀ ('devotions'), ʿniania ࡏࡍࡉࡀࡍࡉࡀ ('responses'), and rušuma ࡓࡅࡔࡅࡌࡀ (' "signing" prayers'). Many scrolls contain symbolic descriptions of rituals, such as various types of masiqta and masbuta rituals. Mandaean texts typically have colophons (tarik ࡕࡀࡓࡉࡊ) giving detailed information about the scribes who had transcribed them, as well as dates, lineages, and other historical information.

Drower (1953) recognizes six main groups of Mandaean literature.

1. esoteric texts, exclusively for priests
2. ritual texts, exclusively for priests
3. hymns, psalms, and prayers
4. hortatory and general texts
5. astrological texts
6. magical writings

== History ==
Little is known about the redactors or authors of the texts. The contents date to both pre-Islamic and Islamic periods. The oldest Mandaean magical text is dated to the 4th and 5th centuries CE.

During the past few decades, Majid Fandi Al-Mubaraki, a Mandaean living in Australia, has digitized many Mandaean texts using typesetted Mandaic script.

== Texts ==
This section lists the titles of various Mandaic religious texts.

=== Main scriptures ===
The primary three scriptures containing the most important narratives, liturgies, and doctrines of Mandaeism are the Ginza Rabba, Mandaean Book of John, and Qulasta. They are widely used by both lay Mandaeans and Mandaean priests. The Haran Gawaita is a text that discusses the origins and history of the Mandaean people.

Primary scriptures

- Ginza Rabba (The Great Treasure, also known as The Book of Adam) (DC 22, etc.)
- Qolastā (Canonical Prayerbook) (DC 53, etc.) (see also list of Qulasta prayers)
  - Sidra ḏ-Nišmata (Book of Souls) (beginning of the Qulasta)
  - Eniania (The Responses) (part of the Qulasta)
- Mandaean Book of John, also known as The Book of Kings (DC 30, etc.)

History

- Haran Gawaita (Scroll of Great Revelation) (DC 9, DC 36, RRC 3E)

=== Priestly texts ===
- Ritual and esoteric texts used for priestly use
  - The Thousand and Twelve Questions (DC 36 [complete, with all 7 books]; DC 6 [incomplete]; parts in RRC 2M, RRC 3R, RRC 6D)
  - The Coronation of the Great Šišlam (DC 54, RRC 1A, RRC 2E)
  - Scroll of Exalted Kingship (DC 34, RRC 2O)
  - Scroll of Abatur (DC 8, BS 175)
  - The Baptism of Hibil Ziwa (DC 35, RRC 2U, BL Add. 23,602B)
  - Scroll of the Rivers (DC 7)
  - Scroll of the Great Baptism (DC 50, RRC 1C)
  - Dmut Kušṭa (Bodleian MS Asiat. Misc. C 12, RRC 2V, RRC 2X)
  - Alma Rišaia texts
    - Alma Rišaia Rba (DC 41, RRC 2P, RRC 3D, BL Add. 23,602B)
    - Alma Rišaia Zuṭa (DC 48, RRC 3F)
  - Scroll of the Ancestors (DC 42)
  - Secrets of the Ancestors (Bodleian MS Asiat. Misc. C 13)
  - Zihrun Raza Kasia (DC 27)
  - Scroll of the Parwanaya (DC 24)
- Wedding liturgy and rituals
  - The Wedding of the Great Šišlam (DC 38, CS 15, CS 25)
- Astrology
  - Book of the Zodiac (DC 31, etc.)

=== Magical texts ===
Magical texts (or grimoires) such as zrazta, qmaha, and the like are listed below. Note that these manuscript designations (zrazta, qmaha, etc.) are interchangeable, with different manuscript titles providing varying designations.

- Šafta texts
  - Qaština (DC 39, DC 43j, RRC 1G, Bodleian MS Syr. G 2 (R))
  - Dahlulia (DC 20, DC 43e)
  - Pišra ḏ-Ainia (DC 21, DC 29, RRC 1E, RRC 3K, MS Berlin)
  - Pišra ḏ-Šambra (DC 10, DC 47, Bodleian MS Syr. G 2 (R), MS "P.A.")
  - Pišra ḏ-Šumqa (DC 23, RRC 1P)
  - Pišra ḏ-Pugdama ḏ-Mia (DC 51)
  - Pašar Haršia (DC 12)
  - Pašar Mihla (DC 40, RRC 2C)
  - Masihfan Rba (DC 37, etc.)
- Qmaha texts
  - Riš Tus Tanina (DC 26)
  - Bit Mišqal Ainia (DC 26, DC 28, RRC 1T)
  - Nirig, Sira, and Libat (DC 32)
  - Šuba lbišna, ʿSirna hthimna, and Yawar Ziwa (DC 33, DC 43c)
  - Šiul (DC 19, DC 43b, DC 45, DC 46, RRC 3N)
  - Ṣir Sahria (DC 43a, CS 27)
  - Br ʿngaria (DC 43g, RRC 1F)
  - Yurba (DC 43h, RRC 1F)
  - Gastata (DC 43f, RRC 1F)
- Zrazta texts
  - Hibil Ziwa (DC 13, DC 14, DC 44)
  - Ptahil Rba (DC 15)
  - Šuba Šibiahia (DC 18, DC 43i, RRC 1F)
- Šalhafta texts
  - Mahr[i]a (DC 17, DC 19, DC 43d)
- Books
  - Haršia Bišia (DC 45, DC 46)
- Lead amulets
  - The Descent of Iauar (MLSC 2), a lead amulet from the Schøyen Collection. CAL text.

== Library collections ==
The majority of known Mandaean texts are currently held at libraries in Oxford, London, and Paris.

=== Bodleian Library ===
Bodleian Library manuscripts (excluding the Drower Collection)

- Oxford Scroll G; Bodleian Library. Two texts for repelling evil spirits.
- Codex Marsh. 691 (Oxford); Bodleian Library. Dates to September 5, 1529 A.D., in Huwayza. It is the oldest Mandaean manuscript held in a European library, since Thomas Marshall's servant had donated the book (obtained by Marshall via Dutch merchants) to the Bodleian Library in 1689 or 1690, after Marshall's death. Codex of prayers with 116 pages. Unpublished (see Lidzbarski, Mandäische Liturgien).
- Hunt. 6 (Ginza), unpublished.
- Hunt. 71 (JB) (see Lidzbarski, Johannesbuch, MS D.). Copied by Adam bar Sam in Basra, on August 15, 1659 A.D. (1068 A.H.).
- MS Asiat. Misc. C 12: Diwan ḏ-Qadaha Rba Šuma ḏ-Mara ḏ-Rabuta u-Dmut Kušṭa or simply Dmut Kušṭa ("The Scroll of the Great Prayer, the Name of the Lord of Greatness and the Image of Truth"), unpublished. Copied by Yahia Ram Zihrun, son of Mhatam in 1818 in Qurna.
- MS Asiat. Misc. C 13: Diuan u-Tafsir ḏ-Raza ḏ-Abahata ("The Scroll [of] the Secrets of the Ancestors" (or "Parents")). Copied at Mučarra in 1238 A.H. (1822-3 A.D.) by Iahia Ram Zihrun br Mhatam. The text lists the names Barmeil, Bihdad, Bihram, Šišlam, Šišlameil, Manhareil, Nureil, Zihrun, Sahqeil, Haiil, and Reil. CAL text.
- MS Syr. E 15 (a small prayerbook copied in 1849 containing 151 folios).
- MS Syr. E 18 (prayers), unpublished.
- MS Syr. F 2 (R) (Mandaean liturgies) (Lidzbarski's "Roll F") (see Lidzbarski, Mandäische Liturgien). Copied in 1203 A.H. (1788-9 A.D.) near Shushtar.
- MS Syr. G 2 (R): Qaština ("The Archer") and Šambra ("The Rue"). Copied by Iahia Ramzihrun br Mhatam br Mhata Iuhana in Qurna in 1231 A.H. (1815-6 A.D.). CAL texts of Šambra and Qaština.

=== British Library ===
British Library manuscripts

- Add. 23,599, Add. 23,600, and Add. 23,601: three Ginzas catalogued under the same title, Liber Adami Mendaice.
  - Add. 23,599 was presented to Queen Victoria by the rishama Sheikh Yahana 10 December 1872, via Colonel Herbert, Consul General of Baghdad.
  - Add. 23,600 was donated to the British Museum in April 1860 by the widow of Colonel J. E. Taylor, the British Vice-Consul at Baghdad. It has 315 folios and was copied by Adam Yuhana, the father of Yahia Bihram.
  - Add. 23,601 was copied by Adam Yuhana, son of Sam and dates to 1824.
- Add. 23,602A, Kholasta sive liturgica Sabiorum Libri Joannis Fragmenta Mendaice ("scrapbook of Mandaean manuscript fragments"). 101 pages. Folia 76–98 and 99–101 contain parts of the Mandaean Book of John.
- Add. 23,602B, Kholasta sive liturgica Sabiorum Libri Joannis Fragmenta Mendaice: book of fragments probably obtained by Colonel John George Taylor. Contains fragments of Maṣbuta ḏ-Hibil Ziua and Alma Rišaia Rba. Folia 15–18 contain parts of the Mandaean Book of John. Documented in Wright (1872).
- Or. 1236 (Oriental 1236): Sidra Rba Mandaitic
- Or. 6592 (Lidzbarski's "Roll A" or "London Scroll A"), text called Šarh ḏ-Taraṣa ḏ-Taga ḏ-Šišlam Rba. It was copied in Muḥammara in 1289 A.H. (1872-1873 A.D.), itself copied from a composite text.
- Or. 6593 (Lidzbarski's "Roll B" or "London Scroll B"), apotropaic contents. The two rolls A and B (i.e., OR 6592 and OR 6593) are in one container. Both date from 1869, with the first one from Muhammerah and the second one from Qurna.
- Small lead plates held at the British Museum

=== Bibliothèque nationale de France ===
Bibliothèque nationale de France Code Sabéen manuscripts

The Code Sabéen (also Codex Sabéen or CS) manuscripts are held at the National Library of France (BnF). Much of the following information is derived from an 1874 catalogue of Syriac manuscripts compiled by Jules-Antoine Taschereau, which lists descriptions for Mss. Sabéen 1–19. Many of the manuscripts can be viewed online at the Bibliothèque nationale de France's Gallica digital library.

- Code Sabéen 1 (PDF), also known as MS Paris A (dated to 1560 A.D.): Ginza Rabba. Copied at Maqdam, Iraq by Ram Baktiar bar Bihram Šadan. Julius Heinrich Petermann's Ginza transcription into Mandaic and Syriac was primarily based on this manuscript, although he consulted Mss. Paris B, C, and D as well. The CAL text of the Left Ginza is mostly based on this manuscript.
- Code Sabéen 2, also known as MS Paris B: Ginza that was translated into Latin by Matthias Norberg (1816). Copied at Basra and Maqdam by the chief priest Baktiar-Bulbul bar Ram Ziwa in 1042 A.H. (1632-1633 A.D.) for Adam Zihrun bar Sharat.
- Code Sabéen 3, also known as MS Paris C: Ginza copied at Howaiza, in 1091 A.H. (1680 A.D.). The first half of the first part was copied (except for a few pages) by Ram Yuhana bar Hawa. The second half of the first part was copied by Yahÿa Adam bar Rabbai Bakhtiar Bulbul. The second part was copied for Ram Yuhana bar Hawa, by Yahya Sam bar Bihram.
- Code Sabéen 4 (PDF), also known as MS Paris D: Ginza copied at a location on the Shamaniya Canal, for Abdallah or Bihram, son of Anhara. There appears to have been many copyists. The introductory formula has the name Bihram bar Simath. In the colophon of the first part and the second part, Yahya Bihram, son of Adam Yuhana, names himself expressly as the copyist of the manuscript. The date is unclear, but is sometime in the early 1700s. The colophon of the first part mentions the date 1100 A.H. Matthias Norberg's Mandaic transcription and Latin translation of the Ginza was primarily based on this manuscript.
- Code Sabéen 5 (PDF): Prayers, many of which are also found in the Left Ginza.
- Code Sabéen 6-7 (PDF): Ginza copied from MS Colbert 1715 by L. Picques in 1683 A.D. The notes are originally from MS Colbert 382.
- Code Sabéen 8: Mandaean Book of John. Copied by Adam Zihrun bar Zaki Shitil in Khalafabad, Iran, in August or September 1630 A.D. (1039 A.H.) during the month of Hitia.
- Code Sabéen 9: Mandaean Book of John. Copied in 1102 A.H. at Duraq (or Dawraq; now Shadegan), Iran by Adam Zihrun bar Mhatam on January 18, 1691.
- Code Sabéen 10: Mandaean Book of John. Copied by Zihrun bar Adam in al-Mīnā’, Basra, on October 13, 1616.
- Code Sabéen 11: Mandaean Book of John copied from Sabéen 8 by L. Picques. Many passages are accompanied by Latin translations.
- Code Sabéen 12: Qulasta (masbuta and masqita hymns). Copied at Kamalawa in 978 A.H. (1570 A.D.) by Adam Shitlan br Yahia Sam br Zihrun Bihram. Lacks prayers 5-10. Included in Euting (1867).
- Code Sabéen 13: Qulasta (masbuta and masqita hymns). Copied at Basra in 1105 A.H. (1694 A.D.).
- Code Sabéen 14: Qulasta (masbuta and masqita hymns). Copied from Colbert m.s. 4108 (see Sabéen 12) by L. Picques and partially translated into Latin.
- Code Sabéen 15 (Mark Lidzbarski's F manuscript). This manuscript is a partial copy of The Marriage of the Great Šišlam (Šarh ḏ-Qabin ḏ-Šišlam Rba) and also includes prayers from the Sidra ḏ-Nišmata (part of the Qulasta). Copied at Basra in 1086 A.H. (1675 A.D.) by Yahya bar Sam bar Zakia Shitil. Included in Euting (1867).
- Code Sabéen 16 (or the Paris Diwan): Scroll, 1360 cm x 16 cm. 409 lines on the cosmogony, beliefs, duties of bishops and priests, and of the faithful, etc., in the form of questions and answers. These questions are believed to have been addressed by Hibil Ziwa Yawar to Nbat Rabba. Copied at Howaiza in 1127 A.H. (1716 A.D.).
- Code Sabéen 17
- Code Sabéen 18
- Code Sabéen 19 (PDF)
- Code Sabéen 20 (PDF)
- Code Sabéen 21 (PDF)
- Code Sabéen 22 (PDF)
- Code Sabéen 23
- Code Sabéen 24: Texts about magical amulets.
- Code Sabéen 25 (PDF) (Mark Lidzbarski's E manuscript). This manuscript is a copy of The Book of the Zodiac (Asfar Malwāšē), and also a partial copy of The Marriage of the Great Šišlam (Šarh ḏ-Qabin ḏ-Šišlam Rba). However, it contains a longer appendix of more recent date.
- Code Sabéen 26 (PDF)
- Code Sabéen 27 (PDF): Qmahia (magical amulet texts).
- Code Sabéen 28 (PDF)
- Code Sabéen 29 (PDF)
- Code Sabéen 30 (PDF)

=== Other libraries ===
- MS Borgiani Siriaci 175 (held at the Vatican Library). This manuscript is a copy of Diwan Abatur.
- Strasbourg MS 3.978: The manuscript was copied for Julius Heinrich Petermann by Yahia Bihram br Adam Yuhana in 1270 A.H. (1853–4 A.D.). A Neo-Mandaic poem in the manuscript was composed in 1203 A.H. (1788 A.D.) and copied in 1270 A.D. (1853–4 A.D.) by R. Adam Yuhana.

== Individual collections ==
=== Private collections ===
Buckley has also found Ginza manuscripts that are privately held by Mandaeans in the United States (two in San Diego, California; one in Flushing, New York; and one in Lake Grove, New York). Buckley has also located a privately held copy of the Book of the Zodiac dating from 1919, which belonged to Lamea Abbas Amara in San Diego.

Manuscripts of the Mandaean Book of John that are privately held by Mandaeans in the United States include:

- MS Flushing, an original manuscript belonging to Nasser Sobbi. Copied by Sheikh Mhatam bar Yahya Bihram on April 9, 1910.
- MS Colonie (originally held at Niskayuna), photocopy of a manuscript from Ahvaz belonging to Dr. Sinan Abdullah. Copied by Bayan, son of Sharat (Salem Choheili) on April 12, 1989.
- MS San Diego, an original manuscript that belonged to Lamea Abbas Amara, who brought it to San Diego, United States from Nasiriyah, Iraq. Copied by Mhatam Zihrun bar Adam on May 13, 1922.

The Rbai Rafid Collection (RRC) is a private collection of Mandaean manuscripts belonging to the Mandaean priest Rbai Rafid al-Sabti in Nijmegen, Netherlands. Important manuscripts in the collection include different versions of the Ginza Rba, various priestly texts, and numerous magical texts.

Individual Mandaean priests, including Salah Choheili, also have private manuscript collections.

=== Rbai Rafid Collection ===
The Rbai Rafid Collection (RRC), held by Rbai Rafid al-Sabti in Nijmegen, Netherlands, is likely the world's largest private collection of Mandaean manuscripts. The physical manuscripts date back to the 17th century, while the contents date back to pre-Islamic times. The entire collection was photographed by Matthew Morgenstern in 2013. Many manuscripts in the collection have been digitized and published online in transliterated format by Matthew Morgenstern and Ohad Abudraham. RRC manuscripts cited in the Comprehensive Aramaic Lexicon (CAL) are as follows. The following list is compiled from the CAL and Morgenstern's article "New Manuscript Sources for the Study of Mandaic".

RRC MS	Contents	Notes
RRC 1A	Šarḥ ḏ-Traṣa ḏ-Taga ḏ-Šišlam Rba	Copied in Shushtar in 1156 A.H. (1744-5 A.D.) by Iuhana br Ram br Sam br Adam k. Malka Sabur. More accurate than the corrupt Drower version and the late British Library version. Main text used in the CAL.
RRC 1C	Šarḥ Maṣbuta Rbtia	Copied in 1074 A.H. (1663-4 A.D.) by Yahia Yuhana br Rbai Zihrun Adam in Šuštar. Most complete manuscript of Šarḥ Maṣbuta Rbtia. A transliteration and English translation of the colophon is included Morgenstern (2019). Variant: DC 50. Main text used in the CAL.
RRC 1E	Šapta ḏ-Pišra ḏ-Ainia	Variants: DC 29, DC 21, MS Berlin, RRC 3K.
RRC 1F	Qmaha ḏ-br ˁngaria; Qmaha ḏ-br ˁngaria Zuṭa; Qmaha ḏ-Šuba; Qmaha ḏ-Iurba; Qmaha ḏ-Gastata	Copied by Mhatam Iuhana br Ram Zihrun br Sam k. ˁAziz l. Kupašia udurašiḥ in 1286 A.H. (1869-70 A.D.). Variants: DC 43g I and DC 43g II (copied by Iahia Bihram br Adam Iuhana in the marshlands in 1272 A.H. (1855-6 A.D.)), DC 46, Codex Sabéen (CS) 27.
RRC 1G	Šapta ḏ-Qaština	Copied by Mhatam Iuhana br Ram Zihrun br Sam in the marshlands in 1287 A.H. (1870-1 A.D.)
RRC 1P	Šapta ḏ-Pišra ḏ-Šumqa	Copied in Amara in 1289 A.H. (1872-3 A.D.) by Ram Zihrun br Sam Zihrun br Iahia Zihrun k. ˁAziz
RRC 1T	Šapta ḏ-Bit Mišqal Ainia	Copied by Adam Yuhana br Sam br Bihram in Shushtar in 1196 A.H. (1782 A.D.). Earliest manuscript of Bit Mišqal Ainia. Variants: DC 26 and DC 28. Main text used in the CAL.
RRC 2C	Pašar Mihla	Copied in 1274 A.H. (1857-1858 A.D.). More accurate than DC 40. Main text used in the CAL.
RRC 2E	Šarḥ ḏ-Traṣa ḏ-Taga ḏ-Šišlam Rba	Copied in Mučarra in 1200 A.H. (1785–1786 A.D.). Damaged manuscript.
RRC 2M	Diwan Mhita u-Asuta	Copied by Zihrun br Yahia Sam in 1086 A.H. (1675–1676 A.D.). Longest RRC manuscript. Contains Neo-Mandaic features. Part of Alf Trisar Šuialia, corresponds to "Blow and healing" (Part 5.1) in Book 2 of Drower (1960).
RRC 2O	Diwan Malkuta Elaita	Copied by Sam Yuhana br Yahia Adam in Ḥuwaiza in 1077 A.H. (1666–7 A.D.). Missing a large section corresponding to lines 912–1131 of DC 34 but is often more accurate than DC 34.
RRC 2P	Alma Rišaia Rba	Copied in Dezful in 1259 A.H. (1843 A.D.). Partial copy.
RRC 2U	Maṣbuta ḏ-Hibil Ziwa	Copied in 1168 A.H. (1754-5 A.D.). DC 35 (from 1247 A.H. (1831–2 A.D.)) was copied from RRC 2U.
RRC 2V	Tafsir Rba ḏ-Dmut Kušṭa	Copied in 1240 A.H. (1824-5 A.D.).
RRC 2X	Tafsir Rba ḏ-Dmut Kušṭa	Copied in 1204 A.H. (1789-90 A.D.).
RRC 3D	Alma Rišaia Rba	Copied in Šuštar in 1274 A.H. (1857–8 A.D.). Partial copy.
RRC 3E	Haran Gauaita	Copied by Zihrun br Iahia Iuhana br Adam Zihrun in Dezful in 1174 A.H. (1760-1 A.D.)
RRC 3F	Alma Rišaia Zuṭa	Copied in 1238 A.H. (1822-3 A.D.) by Iahia Ram Zihrun br Mhatam br Mhatam Iuhana br Bihram br Mašad br Naǰmia br Karam br Kairia br Haiat kinianḥ Sabur
RRC 3K	Šapta ḏ-Pišra ḏ-Ainia	Copied in Šuštar in 1080 A.H. (1669-70 A.D.). Oldest surviving Mandaic magical manuscript. Variants: DC 29, DC 21, MS Berlin, RRC 1E.
RRC 3N	Qmaha ḏ-Šiul; Ṣir Sahra	Qmaha ḏ-Šiul variants: DC 45:5–7, DC 43b, DC 46, DC 19. Ṣir Sahra variants: DC 43a, Codex Sabéen (CS) 27.
RRC 3R	Tafsir u-Afrašta Kasita	Copied in 1173 A.H. (1759–0 A.D.). Variant: DC 36. Titled Tafsir u-Afrašta Kasita, it corresponds to Books 6 and 7 in Drower's (1960) Alf Trisar Šuialia.
RRC 4G	Draša ḏ-Yahia	Copied at Qurna in 1248 A.H. (1832–1833 A.D.) by Yahia Bihram br Adam Yuhana.
RRC 5A	–	Copied in 1301 A.H. (1883-1884 A.D.); the scribe also copied RRC 2C
RRC 5I	Ginza Rba	Copied in 1294 A.H. (1877 A.D.) by Bihram br Ram Zihrun br Sam Bihram. Includes a Neo-Mandaic poem that was composed in 1161 A.H. (1748 A.D.) and copied in 1294 A.H. (1877 A.D.) by Yahia Yuhana.
RRC 5J	Ginza Rba	Copied at the Margab quarter of Suq eš-Šuyūḵ in A.H. 1277 (1860–1861 A.D.).
RRC 5L	Ginza Rba	Copied at the Margab quarter of Suq eš-Šuyūḵ in A.H. 1256 (1840–1841 A.D.).
RRC 6D	Sigia ḏ-Dihbaiia	Copied in Šuštar in 1085 A.H. (1674–5 A.D.). Variants: DC 36, DC 6. Part of Alf Trisar Šuialia.

The collection also contains multimedia items, including audio and video recordings. A few of them include:

- Mn iardna silqit – "I rose up from the river" (Qulasta 21) (RRC AUDIO-A12)
- Nukraiia (Qulasta 49) (RRC AUDIO-A9)
- Zidana u-mzaudana (Qulasta 96) (RRC AUDIO-A22)

=== Drower Collection ===
The Drower Collection (DC), held at the Bodleian Library in Oxford University, is the world's most extensive institutional library collection of Mandaean manuscripts. The collection consists of 55 Mandaean manuscripts collected by E. S. Drower. Drower has published some of the smaller texts in journal articles, while other larger texts have been published as monographs. Many texts remain unpublished.

Drower donated MSS Drower 1–53 to the Bodleian Library in 1958. MS Drower 54 (The Coronation of the Great Šišlam) was given to the library by Lady Drower in 1961, and MS Drower 55 (Drower's personal notebook) was added in 1986. DC 1–5, 22, 30, 31, 38, 45, and 53 are codices, with the rest of the DC manuscripts being scrolls.

A list of manuscripts in the Drower Collection, based on primarily on Buckley (2010), as well as Drower (1937) and other sources, is given below. The manuscripts are abbreviated DC.

- DC 1 – prayerbook (codex) containing prayers for rituals such as minor ablutions (rahmia and lofania). 238 pp.
- DC 2 – prayerbook (codex) called the Sidra ḏ-Nišmata ("Book of the Soul") that was copied by Shaikh Nejm (or Negm; full priestly name: Adam Negm, son of Zakia Zihrun, son of Ram Zihrun) for Drower in 1933. 155 pp. Jacques de Morgan had also acquired a copy of the Book of Souls during his travels to Iran from 1889 to 1891.
- DC 3 – codex of prayer fragments (incomplete Qulasta), such as prayers for minor ablutions, the rahmia (devotions), qulasta, masiqta, zidqa brikha (blessed oblations), and myrtle and banner (drabša) hymns. It was bound by Sheikh Dakhil Aidan in Amarah.
- DC 4 – codex consisting of a Mandaic-English glossary compiled by Shaikh Nejm for Drower, with the help of an English-speaking Mandaean. See Hezy & Morgenstern (2012).
- DC 5 – prayerbook (codex). Known as the "Prayers of Yahya." Copied by Hirmiz bar Anhar.
- DC 6 – Alf Trisar Šuialia ("1012 Questions", incomplete version). Contains parts 3-7 (out of 7 parts total) of the 1012 Questions. One part is known as the Tafsir Pagra. 14400 mm long by 337 mm wide (about 12 inches) with 1652 lines. Copied by Adam Zihrun, son of Bihram Šitlan, of the Šaʿpuria clan in Shushtar in 1557 (965 A.H.).
- DC 7 – Diwan Nahrwata ("The Scroll of the Rivers"). The illustrated scroll is a geographical treatise. Kurt Rudolph published a German translation in 1982, based on a Baghdad copy originally from Ahvaz. In 2022, Brikha Nasoraia published an English translation and analysis. About 3300 words. Copied by Ram Zihrun, son of Sam Bihram, Kupašia in Shushtar in 1259 A.H. (1843 A.D.).
- DC 8 – Diwan Abatur. Copied by Ram Yuhana, son of Ram, of the Dihdaria and Sabur clans (active ca. 1743). A scroll wrapped in linen cloth that is 14,630 mm long by 316 mm wide (about 48 feet long and 1 foot wide), with approximately 800 lines. Interspersed illustrations. A note inside the box is labelled "Bahrami purchase". Donated by Drower to the Bodleian Library in 1950.
- DC 9 – Haran Gawaita. Copied by Ram Zihrun, son of Sam Bihram, Kupašia in Margab, Iran in 1276 A.H. (1859 A.D.).
- DC 10 – Pišra ḏ-Šambra (love charm magic scroll). A qmaha that is an invocation to Libat (Venus). Translated and published in JRAS (1939).
- DC 11 – zrazta (talisman). Illustrated scroll with 183 lines.
- DC 12 – Pašar Haršia ("The Exorcism of Wizards" / "The Loosing of Spells"). A qmaha that is an exorcism of witches and wizards. Purchased by Drower from Shaikh Abdallah in Ahvaz in 1933. Dates to 1196 A.H. / 1782 C.E. Transcribed by Adam Yuhana, son of Sam, son of Bihram, Kamisia clan at Šaka by the Karka River (or Kerak River). An English translation of the colophon can be found in Gelbert (2017). CAL text.
- DC 13 – zrazta of Hibil Ziwa. Also called "Roll C." Part of the Zrazta ḏ-Hibil Ziwa (DC 44). Purchased by Drower from Shaikh Kumait in 1933.
- DC 14 – zrazta or magical / "protective" text. Part of the Zrazta ḏ-Hibil Ziwa (DC 44). Purchased by Drower from Shaikh Kumait. 185 lines.
- DC 15 – zrazta of the Great Ptahil (Zrazta ḏ-Ptahil Rba). A very long scroll purchased by Drower from Shaikh Nejm, in Qal‛at Saleh in April 1933. Also called "Roll E."
- DC 16 – Exorcism scroll. Also called "Roll F." 101 lines. Purchased by Drower in 1933.
- DC 17 – Šalhafta ḏ-Mahra. A small 2.5-inch wide exorcism scroll also called "Roll G."
- DC 18 – Zrazta ḏ-Šuba Šibiahia ("The Talisman of the Seven Planets"). There is a section for each of the seven planets. Copied by Shaikh Faraj (Adam br Iahia br Adam Zihrun) for Drower in Baghdad in 1355 A.H. (1935 A.D.). Variants: DC 43i and RRC 1F.
- DC 19 – Šalhafta ḏ-Mahra ("The Exorcism of Illness"), consisting of two texts. Copied by Adam Zihrun br Ram Zihrun br Adam Iuhana in Baghdad in 1355 A.H. (1935 A.D.). Variants are DC 43d and Codex Sabéen (CS) 27: 10a–14a (undated, prob. 19th century).
- DC 20 – Šafta ḏ-Dahlulia ("The Scroll of, i.e. against Evil Spirits"). Illustrated scroll copied by Sheikh Faraj for Drower in Baghdad in 1935. Originally copied in 1250 A.H. (1834–5 A.D.) in Shaṭra by Adam br Bihram br Yahia. 236 lines. CAL text.
- DC 21 – Šafta ḏ-Pišra ḏ-Ainia ("Exorcism of the Evil and Diseased Eyes"). Copied by Shaikh Faraj for Drower in December 1935. 803 lines. Published by Drower in JRAS No. 4 (Oct. 1937). See also Müller-Kessler (1999). Analysis by Hunter (2013).
- DC 22 – Ginza Rba codex. Purchased by Drower from Shaikh Nejm in 1936. Transcribed in 1831 by Ram Zihrun, son of Sam Bihram, Kupašia. Ram Zihrun copied the Right Ginza in Qurna, and the Left Ginza in Basra.
- DC 23 – Pašar Šumqa / Pašar Šmaq ("The Exorcism of Fever"). Purchased by Drower from Shaikh Nejm in 1936. 777 lines. Copied in Basra in 1226 A.H. (1811 A.D.) by Bihram Sam br Zihrun. CAL text.
- DC 24 – Šarḥ ḏ-Parwanaia, or Panšā ("The Scroll of the Parwanaya"). German translation and commentary by Burtea (2005). Used for rituals such as the consecration of the cult-hut, the dove (ba) sacrifice, zidqa brikha, the myrtle ritual, etc.
- DC 25 – a qmaha scroll. Purchased by Drower from Hirmiz bar Anhar in Baghdad in 1936.
- DC 26 – two talismans (qmahia). Published by Drower in Iraq 5 (1938): 31–54. Consists of two texts: Bit Mišqal Ainia and Riš Tus Tanina. Copied by Shaikh Faraj (Mhatam Yuhana br Adam Zihrun br Yahia Bihram) in 1355 A.D. (December 1936) for Drower in Baghdad. Bit Mišqal Ainia (Qmaha ḏ-Bit mišqal ainia), a different version of DC 28, was published in Drower (1938). Morgenstern finds Drower's translation to be erroneous; he makes uses of RRC 1T in addition to DC 26 and 28.
- DC 27 – Šarḥ ḏ-Zihrun-Raza-Kasia / Masiqta Zihrun Raza Kasia ("The Masiqta of Zihrun, the Hidden Mystery"). The text covers the masbuta (in lines 23–190) and masiqta (in lines 232–523) of Zihrun Raza Kasia. German translation and commentary by Burtea (2008). An illustrated scroll purchased by Drower from Shaikh Yahia, Qal’at Salih in May 1937. The colophon date is 1088 A.H. (c. 1677 A.D). 559 lines. See Rebrik (2008). CAL text.
- DC 28 – Pišra ḏ-Bit Mišqal Ainia (The Exorcism of "I Sought to Lift My Eyes"), a qmaha text. Purchased by Drower from Shaikh Nejm in June 1937. Published in Drower (1938). Copied by Yahia Bihram br Adam Yuhana br Sam in 1272 A.H. (1855-6 A.D.) in the marshlands.
- DC 29 – Pišra ḏ-Ainia / Pašar Ainia ("Exorcism of the Evil Eye"). Purchased by Drower from Shaikhs Nejm and Yahia in November 1937. CAL text.
- DC 30 – Draša ḏ-Yahia ("Teaching of Yahia" or Mandaean Book of John) (codex). Purchased by Drower from Shaikhs Nejm and Yahia in November 1937. The manuscript copying was finished on March 16, 1753 A.D. (1166 A.H.). Copied in Shushtar by Ram Yuhana, son of Ram, Dihdaria.
- DC 31 – Book of the Zodiac (codex). Purchased by Drower from Shaikhs Nejm and Yahia in November 1937. Copied in Qurna in 1247 A.H. (1831-2 CE) by Ram Zihrun br Bihram Sam br Iahia Zihrun.
- DC 32 – The qmahia of Nirigh, Sira, and Libat ("exorcism of Mars, Moon, and Venus"). Love talisman scroll. Purchased by Drower from Shaikh Nejm in 1938.
- DC 33 – Tlata qmahia or the "three qmahia" (exorcism scrolls): Šuba lbišna, ‛Sirna hthimna, and Yawar Ziwa nišimtai. Purchased by Drower at Litlata in April 1938. Published in JRAS No. 3 (1937).
- DC 34 – Scroll of Exalted Kingship / Diwan Malkuta 'laita. Illustrated scroll purchased by Drower from Shaikh Nejm in April 1939. 1353 lines.
- DC 35 – Diwan Maṣbuta ḏ-Hibil Ziwa ("The Baptism of Hibil Ziwa"). Bought in Persia through Shaikh Nejm on April 29, 1939. Copied by Yahia Bihram, son of Adam Yuhana, of the Qindila, Kamisia and Rish Draz clans in 1831 (1247 AH), but his added postscript extends to 1848. Date incorrectly given as 1750 by Drower. 544 lines of pure text and then 3937 mm of mixed text and illustrations. Donated by Drower to the Bodleian Library in December 1958. Colophons analyzed in Morgenstern (2019).
- DC 36 – Haran Gawaita and 1012 Questions (complete version with all 7 books). A long scroll that is 12 inches wide and 626 inches (17 yards, 14 inches) long. Copied by Yahia Zihrun br Ram in Shushtar in 1088 A.H. (1677 A.D.). CAL text.
- DC 37 – Šafta ḏ-Masihfan Rba ("The Scroll of the Great Overthrower"). Copied by Yahia Bihram, son of Adam Yuhana, in Suq eš-Šuyuk in 1861. 633 lines. There is also a British Library manuscript fragment. There are two additional copies of Šafta ḏ-Masi(h)fan owned by Suhaib Nashi: a manuscript copied in Qalˤat Ṣāleḥ in 1358 A.H. (1939 A.D.) and another undated manuscript probably copied during around the same time. Both of the Suhaib Nashi manuscripts are based on a different manuscript tradition than DC 37.
- DC 38 – Šarḥ ḏ-qabin ḏ-Šišlam Rba ("The Marriage Ceremony of the Great Šišlam"). A scroll that Drower had purchased from Shaikh Nejm in April 1939, along with DC 36, 37, and 39. Transcribed by Adam Yuhana.
- DC 39 – Šafta ḏ-Qaština ("The Scroll of 'I Shoot'"), a qmaha that Drower had purchased from Shaikh Nejm in April 1939. Transcribed in 1802 by Adam Yuhana.
- DC 40 – Šafta ḏ-mihla ("The Scroll of Salt") or Pašra mihla ("The Excorcism of Salt"). An exorcism scroll that uses personified salt to exorcise illnesses and evil spirits. Purchased by Drower from Shaikh Nejm in May 1939. Copied by Bihram br Ram Zihrun br Sam Bihram. Salt is also frequently sprinkled around Mandaean houses to keep evil spirits away. Consisting of 1,137 lines, the manuscript has 14 incantation texts. It was copied in 1247 A.H. (1832 A.D.) by the Bihram bar Ram Zihrun from the Aziz family. See Tarelko (2008).
- DC 41 – Alma Rišaia Rba ("The Great Supreme World"). English translation and commentary by Drower (1963). An illustrated scroll about 545 lines long, dating to 1809 (1220 A.H.). Copied for Colonel J. E. Taylor (Vice-Consul in Baghdad) in Šuštar in 1224 A.H. (1809–10) by Adam Yuhana, son of Sam Bihram (i.e., Ram Zihrun, son of Sam Bihram), of the Kamisia and Rish Draz clans. Bought from Sheikh Nejm in Iraq by Drower in autumn 1939. Donated by Drower to the Bodleian Library in December 1958. CAL text.
- DC 42 - Šarḥ ḏ-Ṭabahata ("The Scroll of Ṭabahata" [Parents], or "The Scroll of the Ancestors"). Used for Parwanaya rituals. Transcribed in 1743 and has 834 lines. Similar to Prayer 170 of the Qulasta, but some names are different. Commentary by Buckley (2010). DC 42 verso contains six texts: šarḥ ḏ-ahaba ḏ-mania b-iuma ḏ-paruanaiia, aprišata ḏ-ahaba ḏ-mania, šarḥ ḏ-ahaba ḏ-mania ḏ-tarmida ʿu ganzibra kḏ napiq, šarḥ ḏ-ṭabahata qria b-šuma ḏ-gabrauʿnta, šarḥ ḏ-dukrana ḏ-šumaiia, šarḥ ḏ-zidqa brika ḏ-paruanaiia. Copied at Basra in 1248 A.H. (1832-3). CAL text of DC 42 verso.
- DC 43 – The Poor Priest's Treasury, a scroll consisting of qmahia used for exorcism and magic. The contents are: Qmaha ḏ-ṣir Sahria (DC 43a); Qmaha ḏ-Šaiul (DC 43b); the three related texts (DC 43c) Šuba libišna, ʿsirna hthimna, and Yawar Ziwa (see DC 33); Šalhafta ḏ-Mahria (DC 43d; see DC 19); Qmaha ḏ-Dahlulia (DC 43e; see DC 20); Qmaha ḏ-Gastata (DC 43f); Qmaha ḏ-Br ʿngaria (DC 43g); Qmaha ḏ-Yurba (DC 43h); Qmaha ḏ-Šuba (DC 43i); Qmaha ḏ-Qaština (DC 43j; of DC 39 and copy in Bodleian). Purchased by Drower from Shaikh Nejm in 1939 and copied in 1270 A.H. (1853 A.D.) in the marshlands in the territory of the Kit bin Sa'ad, by Yahia Bihram br Adam Yuhana. Variants in DC 23b. See also Burtea (2005). CAL texts: DC 43a, 43c, 43d, 43f, 43g I, 43g II, 43h, 43i.
- DC 44 – Zrazta ḏ-Hibil Ziwa ("The Protection of Hibil Ziwa"). The longest talisman in the Drower Collection. Purchased by Drower from Shaikh Nejm in 1939 and was transcribed in 1209 A.H. (1794–1795 A.D.) at Qurna by Sam Bihram, son of Yahia Yuhana, Dihdaria, who also transcribed DC 34. 2140 lines with 2 colophons. The text was first made known to the international scholarly community by Jacques de Morgan (1905), based on a qmaha scroll that de Morgan had purchased during his travels to Iran from 1889 to 1891. Matthew Morgenstern has a photocopy of a Hamš Zaraziata manuscript copied in 1199 A.H. (1784–1785 A.D.), which contains the earliest known copies of Zarazta ḏ-Manda ḏ-Hiia and Zarazta ḏ-Ptahil. There are also many later copies in the Rbai Rafid Collection.
- DC 45 – Haršia Bišia ("A Mandaean Book of Black Magic"). Partially published in journal articles. CAL text of DC 45:5–7 (Qmaha ḏ-Šiul).
- DC 46 – Haršia Bišia ("A Mandaean Book of Black Magic"). Copied by Shaikh Abdallah in March 1942. Different version of DC 45. Partially published in journal articles. DC 45 and DC 46 contain Arabic spells written in Mandaic script. According to Morgenstern & Alfia (2013), "DC 45 and DC 46 are both late copies of magic recipe books or spell formularies that served Mandaean practitioners in Baghdad at the end of the 19th and beginning of the 20th centuries."
- DC 47 – Pišra ḏ-Šambra ("A Phylactery for Rue"). Copied in 1249 A.H. (1833-4 A.D.) by Yahia Bihram, son of Adam Yuhana. Another manuscript analyzed by Drower was a manuscript that the Mandaean silversmith Zahroun Amara had copied for Anastase-Marie de Saint-Élie around the turn of the 20th century. Drower abbreviates the manuscript as P.A.
- DC 48 – Alma Rišaia Zuṭa ("The Smaller Supreme World") (listed as DC 47 in Drower 1953). English translation and commentary by Drower (1963). A text from Shushtar that was copied by Adam Zihrun br Bihram Šitlan br Sam Zakia br Iahia Bulparaš br Ram Iuhana, Ša‛puria clan. Dates to 972 A.H. or 1564 A.D. CAL text.
- DC 49 – Small exorcism scroll
- DC 50 – Šarḥ ḏ-Maṣbuta Rabtia ("The Scroll of the Great Baptism"). Ritual scroll describing the 360 baptisms (masbutas) for a polluted priest. Also called "Fifty Baptisms" and the Raza Rba ḏ-Zihrun. Dates from 1867 and has 962 lines. See Güterbock (2008). Also known in full as Šarḥ ḏ-Maṣbuta Rabtia ḏ-Tlatma u-Šitin Maṣbutiata.
- DC 51 – Pišra ḏ-Pugdama ḏ-Mia ("Exorcism: the Command of the Waters"), of which DC 51 is the only surviving copy. Exorcism invoking the personified waters of life. Dates to 1277 A.H. Copied in Margab, Suq es-šuyukh, in 1277 A.H. (1860-1 A.D.) by Ram Zihrun, son of Sam Bihram, Kupašia. Berlin MS Or. Oct 3752 envelope 34, an incomplete manuscript, parallels DC 51 (lines 433-448). CAL text.
- DC 52 – missing
- DC 53 – Qulasta (Canonical Prayerbook, a complete codex). Purchased by Drower in 1954. Copied in 1802 by the ganzibra Adam Yuhana, the father of Yahia Bihram, in Huwaiza, Khuzistan.
- DC 54 – The Coronation of the Great Šišlam. English translation and commentary by Drower (1962). Or. 6592, British Museum is another manuscript of this text. The scroll is from either Basra or Huwaiza and dates to 1008 A.H. (1599 A.D.). Copied by Sam Šitlan, son of Ram Bayan, Ša‛puria clan. Morgenstern notes that DC 54 is corrupt, while RRC 1A and BL. Or. 6592 are more reliable.
- DC 55 – Drower's personal notebook

== Timeline of major publications ==
Timeline of major publications of important Mandaean scriptures:

- 1867: Ginza Rabba (Mandaic) by Julius Heinrich Petermann
- 1905: Qulasta (German) by Mark Lidzbarski
- 1915: Mandaean Book of John (German) by Mark Lidzbarski
- 1925: Ginza Rabba (German) by Mark Lidzbarski
- 1959: Qulasta (English) by E. S. Drower
- 1998: Ginza Rabba and Qulasta (Mandaic) by Majid Fandi Al-Mubaraki
- 2011: Ginza Rabba (English) by Carlos Gelbert and Mark J. Lofts
- 2017: Mandaean Book of John (English) by Carlos Gelbert and Mark J. Lofts
- 2020: Mandaean Book of John (English) by Charles G. Häberl and James F. McGrath
- 2025: Qulasta (English) by Carlos Gelbert and Mark J. Lofts

== Bibliography ==
- Svend Aage Pallis: Essay on Mandaean Bibliography 1560–1930. London, Humphrey Mildford, Oxford University Press, 1933.
- Buckley, Jorunn J. (2016). "Mandaic Literature". The Oxford Handbook of the Literatures of the Roman Empire. Oxford University Press. doi:10.1093/oxfordhb/9780199699445.013.9. ISBN 978-0-19-969944-5.
- Ethel Stefana Drower: The Book of the Zodiac = Sfar malwašia: D. C. 31. London: Royal Asiatic Society, 1949.
- Ethel Stefana Drower: Mandaeans. Liturgy and Ritual. The Canonical Prayerbook of the Mandaeans. Translated with notes. Leiden: E. J. Brill, 1959.
- Ethel Stefana Drower: Haran Gawaita. The Haran Gawaita and the Baptism of Hibil-Ziwa: the Mandaic text reproduced, together with translation, notes and commentary. Città del Vaticano, Biblioteca apostolica vaticana, 1953.
- Ethel Stefana Drower: Alf trisar šuialia. The thousand and twelve questions: a Mandaean text, edited in transliteration and translation. Berlin, Akademie-Verlag, 1960.
- Ethel Stefana Drower: Diwan Abatur. ... or progress through the purgatories. Text with translation notes and appendices. Biblioteca Apostolica Vaticana, Città del Vaticano 1950 (Studi e testi. Biblioteca Apostolica Vaticana 151, ZDB-ID 762276-4).
- M. Nicolas Siouffi: Études sur la Religion/Des Soubbas ou sabéens, leurs dogmes, mœurs par. Paris 1880, ISBN 9781147041224
- J. de Morgan: Mission scientifique en Perse par J. De Morgan. Tome V. Études linguistiques. Deuxième partie. Textes mandaïtes publiés par J. de Morgan avec une notice sur les Mandéens par Cl. Huart. Paris, 1904.
- Hermann Zotenberg: Catalogues des manuscriptes syriaques et sabéens (mandaïtes)
- Henri Pognon: Inscriptions mandaïtes des coupes de Khouabir Paris 1898–1899, parts 1–3.
- Mark Lidzbarski: Ginzā. Der Schatz oder Das große Buch der Mandäer. Göttingen, 1925.
- Mark Lidzbarski: Das Johannesbuch der Mandäer. Gießen: Töpelmann, 1915 [1966].
- Mark Lidzbarski: Das mandäische Seelenbuch, in: ZDMG 61 (1907), 689–698.
- Richard Reitzenstein: Das mandäische Buch des Herrn der Größe und die Evangelienüberlieferung. Heidelberg-Winter, 1919.
- Julius Euting: Qolastā oder Gesänge und Lehren von der Taufe und dem Ausgang der Seele. Stuttgart, 1867.
- B. Poertner: Mandäischer Diwan. Eine photographische. Aufnahme; Straßburg, 1904.
- Brandt, Wilhelm (1889). Die mandäische Religion: ihre Entwickelung und geschichtliche Bedeutung. ATLA Historical Monographs Collection Series 1. J.C. Hinrichs. ISBN 9780790544908.
- Wilhelm Brandt: Mandäische Schriften übersetzt und erläutert. Göttingen, 1893.
- Matthias Norberg: Codex Nasaraeus Liber Adami appellatus. 3 vols. London, 1815–16.
- Julius Heinrich Petermann: Porta linguarum orientalium. Bd. 1–4, 6., Berlin 1840–72.
- Julius Heinrich Petermann: Reisen im Orient. 2 Bde. Leipzig, 1865
- Theodor Nöldeke: Mandäische Grammatik. Halle, 1875
- Werner Foerster: A Selection of Gnostic Texts. Oxford, 1974
- Kurt Rudolph: Theogonie, Kosmogonie und Anthropogonie in den mandäischen Schriften. Eine literarkritische und traditionsgeschichtliche Untersuchung. Vandenhoeck & Ruprecht, Göttingen 1965 (Forschungen zur Religion und Literatur des Alten und Neuen Testaments 88, ZDB-ID 528176-3), (Zugleich: Leipzig, Univ., Phil. Habil.-Schr., 1961).
- Kurt Rudolph: Der mandäische "Diwan der Flüsse. Abhandlungen der Sächsischen Akadademie der Wissenschaft. Phil.-Hist. Klasse 70 Heft 1, Leipzig, 1982.
- Kurt Rudolph. Mandaeism In: David Noel Freedman (ed.), The Anchor Bible Dictionary, Doubleday 1992, ISBN 3-438-01121-2, Bd. 4, S. 500–502.
- Rudolf Macuch: Und das Leben ist siegreich Mandäistische Forschungen 1, Harrassowitz Verlag 2008
- Jorunn Jacobsen Buckley: The Colophons in the Canonical Prayerbook of the Mandaeans. Journal of Near Eastern Studies, Vol. 51, No. 1 (Jan. 1992), 33–50.
- Willis Barnstone: The other Bible. Harper, 1984.
- Meyers Großes Konversations-Lexikon: Mandäer. 1905–1909.
- van Rompaey, Sandra (2011). Mandaean Symbolic Art (Ph.D. thesis). Melbourne: La Trobe University.
- van Rompaey, Sandra (2024). Mandaean Symbolic Art. Turnhout: Brepols. ISBN 978-2-503-59365-4.

== See also ==
- Pistis Sophia
- Nag Hammadi library
- Apocryphon
- Incantation bowl
- Mandaic lead rolls
