= Pišra d-Ainia =

Religious text of Mandaeism

Pišra ḏ-Ainia ࡐࡉࡔࡓࡀ ࡖࡀࡉࡍࡉࡀ

Information
- Religion: Mandaeism
- Language: Mandaic language

Šafta ḏ-Pišra ḏ-Ainia (Classical Mandaic: ࡔࡀࡐࡕࡀ ࡖࡐࡉࡔࡓࡀ ࡖࡀࡉࡍࡉࡀ, "Exorcism of the Evil Eyes") is a Mandaean text used to protect against the evil eye.

== Manuscripts ==
There are at least 4 or 5 extant manuscripts of Pišra ḏ-Ainia.

- Drower Collection (DC) manuscripts held at the Bodleian Library
  - DC 21 was copied by Sheikh Faraj (Adam br Iahia br Adam Zihrun) for E. S. Drower in December 1935 and contains 803 lines. It was published by Drower in JRAS No. 4 (Oct. 1937). Erica Hunter published an analysis in 2013.
  - DC 29 was purchased by Drower from Shaikhs Nejm and Yahia in November 1937. (Full transliterated text from the Comprehensive Aramaic Lexicon)
- Rbai Rafid Collection (RRC) manuscripts held in Nijmegen, Netherlands
  - RRC 1E
  - RRC 3K was copied at Shushtar in 1080 A.H. (1669-70 A.D.). It is the oldest surviving Mandaic magical manuscript currently known to international scholars.
- MS Berlin
