= Scroll of the Great Baptism =

Mandaean text

Scroll of the Great Baptism Šarḥ ḏ-Maṣbuta Rabtia

Information
- Religion: Mandaeism
- Language: Mandaic language

The Scroll of the Great Baptism (Classical Mandaic: ࡔࡀࡓࡇ ࡖࡌࡀࡑࡁࡅࡕࡀ ࡓࡀࡁࡕࡉࡀ Šarḥ ḏ-Maṣbuta Rabtia) is a Mandaean religious text. It is a ritual scroll describing the 360 baptisms (masbutas) for a polluted priest. The scroll is also called "Fifty Baptisms" and the Raza Rba ḏ-Zihrun (Classical Mandaic: ࡓࡀࡆࡀ ࡓࡁࡀ ࡖࡆࡉࡄࡓࡅࡍ, lit. 'Great Mystery of Zihrun').

== Manuscripts ==
Manuscript 50 of the Drower Collection (abbreviated DC 50) is a copy of the Scroll of the Great Baptism. It was copied in 1867 by Yahya Bihram and has 962 lines. Güterbock (2008) contains an analysis of the manuscript.

MS RRC 1C is the most complete manuscript. The manuscript was copied at Shushtar in 1074 A.H. (1663-4 A.D.) by Yahia Yuhana br Rbai Zihrun Adam.

== See also ==
- Scroll of the Parwanaya
