= Haran Gawaita =

Mandaean text

Information
- Religion: Mandaeism
- Language: Mandaic language

The Haran Gawaita (Mandaic: ࡄࡀࡓࡀࡍ ࡂࡀࡅࡀࡉࡕࡀ, meaning "Inner Harran" or "Inner Hauran"; Modern Mandaic: (Diwān) Harrān Gawāythā) also known as the Scroll of Great Revelation, is a Mandaean text which recounts the history of the Mandaeans as Nasoraeans from Jerusalem and their arrival in a region described as "Inner Harran ('haran gauaita) which is called the mountains of Madday" (Mandaic: ṭura ḏ-madai), which some scholars have identified with Media. The Haran Gawaita continues the historical narrative of the Mandaean Book of Kings, adding a new eighth age to the seven described in that work.

The text was published for the first time in 1953.

== Text, dating and authorship ==
The text is in the Mandaic language and script. It is of unknown authorship.

The recipients of the text are stated to be those disciples who must persevere in their faith during the Arab age, meaning that it must post-date the early Muslim conquests at the least. Furthermore, the text makes repeated reference to Baghdad, a city built in 762, and as such is likely to also post-date the 8th century.

== Content ==
According to the Haran Gawaita, John the Baptist was baptized, initiated, and educated by the patron of the Nasirutha (secret knowledge), Enosh (Anush or Anush-ʼuthra), the hierophant of the sect. This research was conducted by the Oxford scholar and specialist on the Nasoraeans, Lady Ethel S. Drower. According to Jorunn J. Buckley, the Mandaeans see themselves to be former Judeans based in Jerusalem that loved Adonai until the birth of Jesus. These Nasoraean disciples of John the Baptist are aware of the destruction of Jerusalem and the Temple in 70 CE, but they did not leave because of this. They fled before 70 CE due to persecution by a faction of more normative Jews. With the help of a king named Artabanus, whom the Mandaean Book of Kings identifies explicitly with Artabanus IV and describes as "one of our forefathers", they travel to a region described as "Inner Harran ('haran gauaita) which is called the mountains of Madday" (Mandaic ṭura ḏ-madai), which some scholars have identified with Media. The traditional pronunciation Madday (rather than Māḏāy 'Media') and its identification with a Jebel Mandai "Mandaean mountain" argue against this identification.

== Manuscripts ==
An English translation of the Haran Gawaita and the Diwan Masbuta d Hibil Ziwa was published in 1953 by Lady E. S. Drower, which was based on manuscripts 9 and 36 of the Drower Collection (abbreviated DC 9 and DC 36, respectively).

A typesetted Mandaic version of DC 9 was published by Majid Fandi Al-Mubaraki in 2002.

MS RRC 3E is another manuscript of the Haran Gawaita. The manuscript was copied by Zihrun br Iahia Iuhana br Adam Zihrun in Dezful in 1174 A.H. (1760-1 A.D.). It has been digitized and analyzed by Matthew Morgenstern.

== Copies and translations ==
A German translation, which makes use of Drower's manuscripts as well as two additional privately held manuscripts, was published in 2020 by Bogdan Burtea.

Buckley has also located a privately held copy of the Haran Gawaita dating from 1930 in Flushing, New York. It was owned by Nasser Sobbi and was originally copied by Mulla Sa’ad, the grandfather of Jabbar Choheili.

== See also ==
- Essenes
- Timeline of Jerusalem
- Second Temple Judaism
- Harran
