= Dmut Kušṭa =

Mandaean religious text

Dmut Kušṭa Diwan ḏ-Qadaha Rba Šuma ḏ-Mara ḏ-Rabuta u-Dmut Kušṭa

Information
- Religion: Mandaeism
- Language: Mandaic language

Diwan ḏ-Qadaha Rba Šuma ḏ-Mara ḏ-Rabuta u-Dmut Kušṭa (Classical Mandaic: ࡃࡉࡅࡀࡍ ࡖࡒࡀࡃࡀࡄࡀ ࡓࡁࡀ ࡔࡅࡌࡀ ࡖࡌࡀࡓࡀ ࡖࡓࡀࡁࡅࡕࡀ ࡅࡃࡌࡅࡕ ࡊࡅࡔࡈࡀ; "The Scroll of the Great Prayer, the Name of the Lord of Greatness and the Image of Truth"), or simply Dmut Kušṭa (or Dmuth Kushta), is a Mandaean religious text. It is written as an illustrated scroll. No published translation of the text currently exists.

It is also known as Tafsir Rba ḏ-Dmut Kušṭa ("The Great Explanation/Tafsir of the Image of Truth").

== Manuscripts ==
The Bodleian Library at Oxford University holds a manuscript of the text, catalogued as MS Asiat. Misc. C 12. The scroll was copied by Yahia Ram Zihrun, son of Mhatam in 1818 in Qurna. It was acquired by E. S. Drower in 1954.

Manuscripts of Tafsir Rba ḏ-Dmut Kušṭa from the Rbai Rafid Collection (RRC), held by Rbai Rafid al-Sabti in Nijmegen, Netherlands, are:

- RRC 2V: Copied in 1240 A.H. (1824-5 A.D.).
- RRC 2X: Copied in 1204 A.H. (1789-90 A.D.).

In 1969, Kurt Rudolph had also seen a copy of the text at a private library in Dora, Baghdad.

In 2002, a published version of Dmut Kušṭa in typeset Mandaic script has been published by Majid Fandi Al-Mubaraki, a Mandaean living in Australia.

== Illustrations ==
MS Asiat. Misc. C 12 contains illustrations of various heavenly trees, which are named after (or identified with) uthras.

- Abatur Rama, as a date palm
- Habšaba, as a fig tree
- Yawar Ziwa, as a great cotton plant
- Yushamin, as a mulberry tree

== Bibliography ==
- Nasoraia, Brikha (2022). A Critical Edition, with Translation and Analytical Study of Diwan Qadaha Rba D-Dmuth Kusta (The Scroll of Great Creation of the Image/Likeness of Truth) (forthcoming). Belgium: Brepols Publishers.
- Nasoraia, Brikha (2022). The Esoteric and Mystical Concepts of the Mandaean Nasoraean Illustrated Scroll: Diwan Qadaha Rba D-dmuth Kusta (the Scroll of the Great Creation of the Image/likeness of Truth) (forthcoming). Belgium: Brepols Publishers.
- Nasoraia, Brikha H.S. (2013). "Mandaean Sacred Art: A Brief Study of Folio 6 of the Secret Mandaean Scroll Diwan Qadaha Rba d-Dmuth Kušţa (The Scroll of Great Creation of the Image of Truth)". The International Journal of Religion and Spirituality in Society. 2 (4). Common Ground Research Networks: 33–45. doi:10.18848/2154-8633/cgp/v02i04/51025. ISSN 2154-8633.
- Nasoraia, Brikha (2010). The Esoteric and Mystical Concepts of the Mandaean Nasoraean Illustrated Scroll: Diwan Qadaha Rba D-dmuth Kusta (the Scroll of the Great Creation of the Image/likeness of Truth). Sydney, Australia: University of Sydney.
- Nasoraia, Brikha (2005). A critical edition with translation and analytical study of Diuan Qadaha Rba D-Dmuth Kušṭa (the Scroll of the Great Creation of the Image/Likeness of Truth) (Ph.D. dissertation). Sydney: Dept. of Hebrew, Biblical and Jewish Studies, University of Sydney. OCLC 225252988.
