= Bogdan Burtea =

Romanian religious studies scholar

- Born: Romania
- Citizenship: Romanian
- Occupation: Researcher

Academic background
- Education: Free University of Berlin
- Doctoral advisor: Rainer Voigt and Kurt Rudolph

Academic work
- Main interests: Mandaeism; Aramaic; Ge'ez

Bogdan Burtea is a Romanian religious studies scholar and Semiticist currently based in Germany. His main interests are Mandaic, Aramaic, and Ethiopic studies.

== Early life and education ==
Bogdan Burtea was born in Romania.

In 1999, Burtea obtained his Master's degree in Semitic Studies and Religious Studies, with a focus on History of Religions, at Free University of Berlin after graduating with a bachelor's degree from the same university. He then became a research assistant at the Seminar for Semitic and Arabic Studies at the Free University of Berlin, which was chaired by Rainer Voigt. He obtained his doctorate in Semitic Studies at the Free University of Berlin in 2003, with his dissertation supervised by Rainer Maria Voigt and Kurt Rudolph.

== Career ==
After graduation, in 2004, Burtea became a research assistant at the Department of Islamic Studies at the University of Erfurt, where he worked on the research project "The Influence of Globalization and Regionalization Processes in the History of the Eastern Church on the Emergence, Spread and Early Development of Islam in the 6th and 7th Centuries".

From 2011 to 2016, he was a research assistant at the Department of Religious Studies of the University of Zurich, where he worked on a research project relating to Ethiopian Orthodox Christianity that was funded by the Swiss National Science Foundation.

From 2004 to 2011, he was a research assistant at the Seminar for Semitic and Arabic Studies at the Free University of Berlin, where he worked on several Mandaic textual translation projects funded by the Fritz Thyssen Foundation and the German Research Foundation (DFG). In 2017, he was a visiting scholar in the BabMed (Babylonian Medicine) research project at the Free University of Berlin.

Since 2018, he has been a research associate at the Faculty of Theology of the Humboldt University of Berlin, supported by funding from the German Research Foundation.

== Translations of Mandaic texts ==
Burtea is known for his German-language translations of several Mandaean religious texts, including:

- Šafta ḏ-Dahlulia ("The Scroll of, i.e. against Evil Spirits", DC 20)
- Zrazta d-Hibil Ziwa ("The Amulet of Hibel Ziwa," DC 44)
- Scroll of the Parwanaya in 2005
- Zihrun Raza Kasia in 2008
- Secrets of the Ancestors in 2012
- Haran Gawaita in 2020
- Diwan Abatur (completed in 2024)
- Left Ginza (in progress, with Christoph Markschies)

== Selected works ==
- Burtea, Bogdan (2005). Das mandäische Fest der Schalttage: Edition, Übersetzung und Kommentierung der Handschrift (DC 24, Šarh ḏ-paruanaiia) (in German). Wiesbaden: Harrassowitz. ISBN 978-3-447-05179-8. OCLC 62273841.
- Burtea, Bogdan (2008). Zihrun, das verborgene Geheimnis (in German). Wiesbaden: Harrassowitz. ISBN 978-3-447-05644-1. OCLC 221130512.
- Burtea, Bogdan (2011). Studies in Jewish Babylonian Aramaic: based upon early Eastern manuscripts. Winona Lake, Ind: Eisenbrauns. ISBN 978-1-57506-938-8. OCLC 673419642.
- Burtea, Bogdan (2012). "Mandaic". The Semitic Languages: An International Handbook. Berlin-Boston: Walter de Gruyter. pp. 670–685. ISBN 9783110251586.
- Burtea, Bogdan (2012). Die Geheimnisse Der Vorvater Edition, Ubersetzung Und Kommentierung Einer Esoterischen Mandaischen Handschrift Aus Der Bodleian Library Oxford (in German). Wiesbaden: Harrassowitz. ISBN 978-3-447-06466-8. OCLC 940934456.
- Burtea, Bogdan (2020). Haran Gauaita, ein Text zur Geschichte der Mandäer: Edition, Übersetzung, Kommentar (in German). Wiesbaden: Harrassowitz Verlag. ISBN 978-3-447-11362-5. OCLC 1138882232.
