= Lamia Abbas Amara =

Iraqi poet (1929–2021)

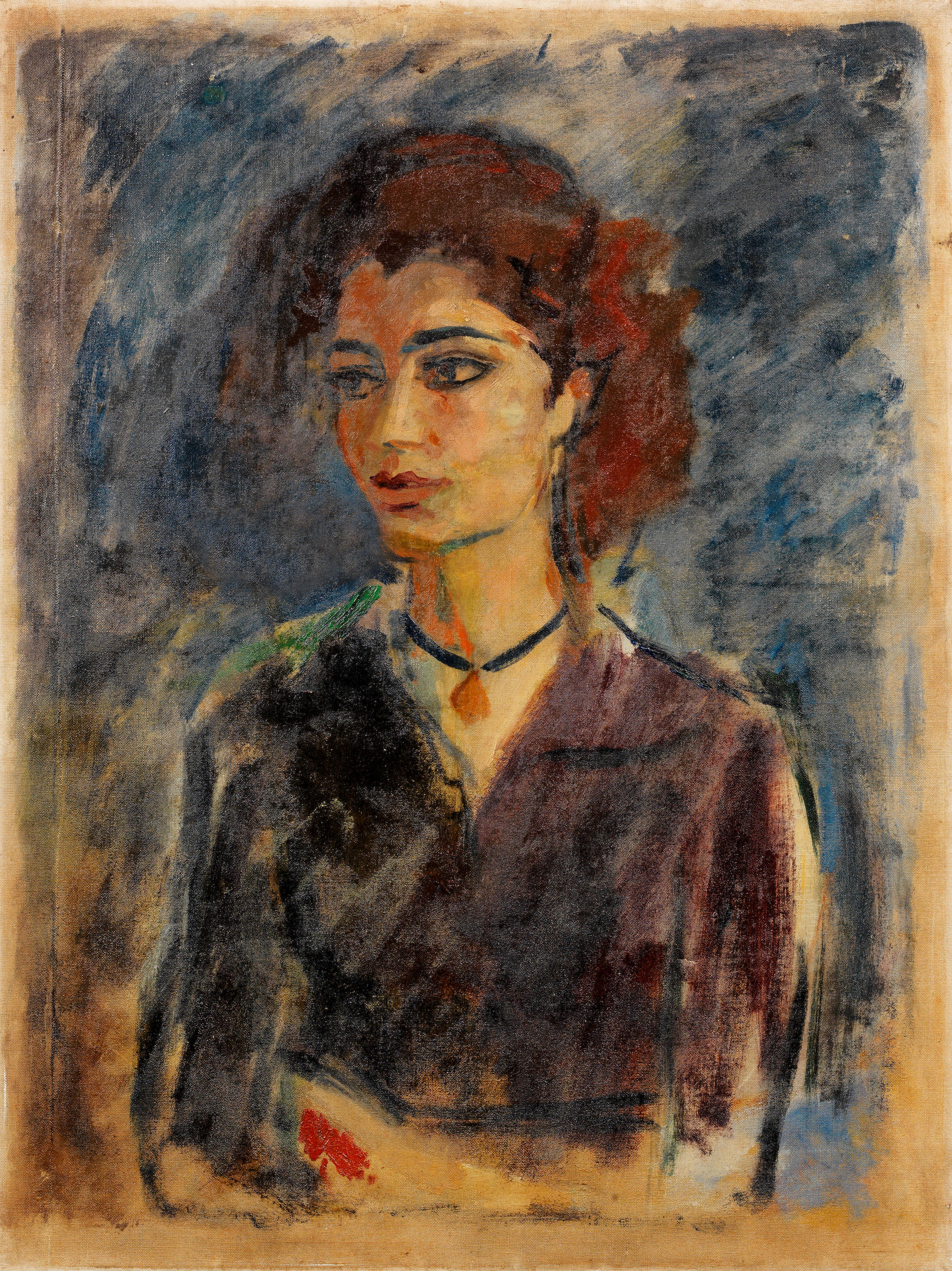
- A 1949 portrait of Lamia Abbas Amara by Jawad Saleem
- Born: 1929; Baghdad, Iraq
- Died: 18 June 2021 (aged 92); San Diego, United States
- Occupation: poet

Lamia Abbas Amara (Arabic: لميعة عباس عمارة; Classical Mandaic: ࡋࡀࡌࡉࡀ ࡀࡁࡀࡎ ࡀࡌࡀࡓࡀ), also sometimes spelled Lamea Abbas Amara; 1929 – 18 June 2021) was an Iraqi poet. She was a pioneer of modern Arabic poetry and an important figure in contemporary poetry in Iraq.

== Name ==
Lamia is her given name, while Abbas is her father's name, and Amara is her paternal grandfather's name.

== Early life and education ==
She was born to a Mandaean family in Baghdad in 1929, and later grew up in Amarah. Her father was Bayan bar Manu, while her paternal grandfather was Sheikh Amara, who worked for the British during World War II. Her uncle Zahroun Amara (died 1929) was a famous silversmith, while her cousin Abdul Razzak Abdul Wahid (1930–2015) was also a poet.

Her mother, the sister of Rabbi Dakhil Aidan, belonged to the Manduia priestly lineage.

She studied at the Teachers' Training College, which later became part of the Baghdad University, and graduated in 1950.

== Career ==
Abbas began writing poetry at age twelve, and published her first poem at age 14 in Al-Samir, a New York-based magazine founded by poet Elia Abu Madi.

She was a member of the administrative board of the Iraqi Writers Union in Baghdad between 1963 and 1975, a member of the administrative board of the Syriac Synod in Baghdad, and deputy permanent representative of Iraq to UNESCO in Paris between 1973 and 1975, and director of culture and arts at the University of Technology in Baghdad.

She left Iraq in 1978 and lived most of her exile in San Diego, United States after emigrating during the time of Saddam Hussein. Her sister, Shafia Abbas Amara, also emigrated to San Diego.

Together with her sister Shafia Abbas Amara, she published a magazine called Mandaee in the United States, which was mostly in Arabic but also partially in English.

Lamia Abbas wrote poetry in both classical and free verse styles, and in both standard and Iraqi Arabic. She tended to focus on the lives of ordinary people, exploring themes of "romance, nature, and freedom" while "denouncing crime and dictatorship" and criticizing women's repression in Iraq. However, her work did not deal with explicit political themes. She was awarded the National Order of the Cedar by the Lebanese state for her work. (Note: She did not receive the award personally, due to the Lebanese Civil War.)

== Personal life and death ==
Lamia Abbas owned several Mandaean manuscripts that were given to her by her maternal uncle, Dakhil Aidan. These manuscripts, including the Ginza Rabba (two copies dating to 1886 and 1935), Mandaean Book of John (from 1922), and Book of the Zodiac (from 1919), were studied by Jorunn Jacobsen Buckley. Buckley and Abbas were also lifelong friends. She kept the manuscripts inside white cotton cloth bags containing musk grains, considered to be the scent of Life by Mandaeans.

Lamia's sons are Zakia and Zaidoun.

Abbas died in the United States on 18 June 2021, aged 92.

== Works ==
=== Collections ===
- The Empty Corner (1960)
- The Return of Spring (1963)
- The Songs of Ishtar (1969)
- They Call It Love (1972)
- If the Wizard Prophecies (alternatively titled If the Fortune-Teller Had Told Me, 1980)
- The Last Dimension (1988)
- Iraqiya (1990)
