= The Coronation of the Great Shishlam =

Mandaean text

The Coronation of the Great Šišlam Šarḥ ḏ-Traṣa ḏ-Taga ḏ-Šišlam Rba
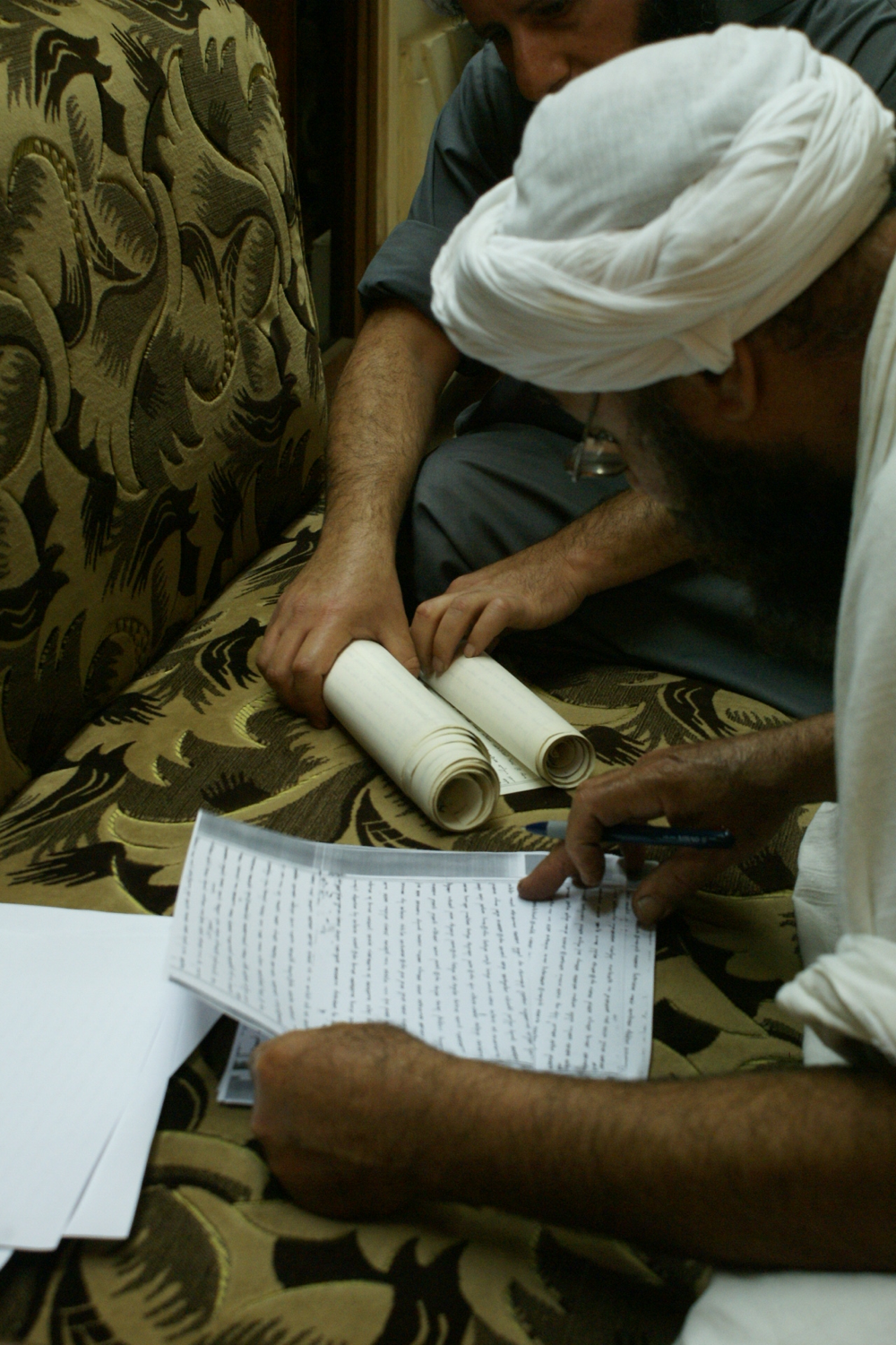
- The Coronation of the Great Shishlam being read inside a tarmida initiation hut in Baghdad, Iraq in 2008

Information
- Religion: Mandaeism
- Language: Mandaic language

The Coronation of the Great Šišlam (or The Coronation of Shishlam Rabba; Classical Mandaic: ࡔࡀࡓࡇ ࡖࡕࡓࡀࡑࡀ ࡖࡕࡀࡂࡀ ࡖࡔࡉࡔࡋࡀࡌ ࡓࡁࡀ, romanized: Šarḥ ḏ-Traṣa ḏ-Taga ḏ-Šišlam Rba) is a Mandaean religious text. The text is a detailed commentary on the initiation of the tarmida (junior priests), with detailed discussions on masbuta and masiqta rituals. The Scroll of Exalted Kingship is also used extensively alongside the Coronation in tarmida initiation rituals. Similar esoteric texts that are traditionally used exclusively by Mandaean priests include The Thousand and Twelve Questions, and The Baptism of Hibil Ziwa.

The Scroll of Exalted Kingship is essentially a much more detailed version of the Coronation. Whereas the Coronation simply lists the sequences of prayers and rituals to be performed, the Exalted Kingship also provides symbolic explanations for each prayer and ritual that is performed.

== Manuscripts and translations ==
In 1962, E. S. Drower published an English translation and commentary of the text, which was based on Manuscript 54 of the Drower Collection (DC 54, which Drower dates to 1008 A.H., i.e. 1590-1591 A.D.) and Or. 6592, British Museum (dated by Drower to 1298 A.H., i.e. 1880-1881 A.D.). Drower donated DC 54 to the Bodleian Library in 1961.

MS RRC 1A is another manuscript of the Coronation text. The manuscript was copied at Shushtar in 1156 A.H. (1744-5 A.D.) by Iuhana br Ram br Sam br Adam k. Malka Sabur. It has been digitized and analyzed by Matthew Morgenstern.

MS RRC 2E, a damaged manuscript, was copied at Mučarra in 1200 A.H. (1785–1786 A.D.).

== See also ==
- Tarmida § Prayer sequence
- Scroll of Exalted Kingship
- The Thousand and Twelve Questions
- The Baptism of Hibil Ziwa
