= Scroll of Exalted Kingship =

Mandaean text

Scroll of Exalted Kingship Diwan Malkuta ʿLaita ࡃࡉࡅࡀࡍ ࡌࡀࡋࡊࡅࡕࡀ ࡏࡋࡀࡉࡕࡀ

Information
- Religion: Mandaeism
- Language: Mandaic language

The Scroll of Exalted Kingship (Classical Mandaic: ࡃࡉࡅࡀࡍ ࡌࡀࡋࡊࡅࡕࡀ ࡏࡋࡀࡉࡕࡀ Diwan Malkuta ʿLaita; Modern Mandaic: Diwān Malkuthā Əlaythā) is a Mandaean religious text. Written as a large illustrated scroll, the text consists of 1363 lines. The scroll is a commentary on the initiation of the tarmida "junior priest".

Other related texts include The Coronation of the Great Shishlam, also a commentary on the initiation of the tarmida, and the two esoteric texts Alma Rišaia Rba "The Great 'First World'" (DC 41) and Alma Rišaia Zuṭa "The Lesser 'First World'" (DC 48).

== Manuscripts and translations ==
An English translation of the text, based on Manuscript 34 of the Drower Collection (commonly abbreviated DC 34), was published by Jorunn Jacobsen Buckley in 1993.

A typesetted Mandaic version of DC 34 was published by Majid Fandi Al-Mubaraki in 2002.

MS RRC 2O, another manuscript version of Diwan Malkuta Elaita, was copied by Sam Yuhana br Yahia Adam in Ḥuwaiza in 1077 A.H. (1666–7 A.D.). Although it is missing a large section corresponding to lines 912–1131 of DC 34, it is often more accurate than DC 34.

== Contents ==
The beginning of the scroll, from lines 7–227, references 103 prayers in the Qulasta, which are:

- a masbuta liturgy (prayers 1–31)
- a masiqta liturgy (prayers 32–72)
- 2 ʿngirta prayers (prayers 73 and 74)
- 3 prayers of praise (prayers 75–77)
- the ʿnianas (prayers 78–103)

The scroll describes what happens in the World of Light (such as being blessed by a certain uthra) for each Qulasta prayer that is recited.

The scroll has an illustrated diagram of a wellspring (aina) with 9 trees emerging out of the wellspring. The wellspring diagram contains the first 6 letters of the Mandaic alphabet (a ࡀ, b ࡁ, g ࡂ, d ࡃ, h ࡄ, u ࡅ), along with 14 sections labeled with the words teacher, crown, wreath, ether, fire, garment, stole, tunic, girdle, mother, father, brother, sister.

== See also ==
- The Thousand and Twelve Questions
