= Book of the Zodiac =

Mandaean text

Book of the Zodiac Sfar Malwašia

Information
- Religion: Mandaeism
- Language: Mandaic language

The Book of the Zodiac (Classical Mandaic: ࡎࡐࡀࡓ ࡌࡀࡋࡅࡀࡔࡉࡀ, romanized: Sfar Malwašia; Modern Mandaic: Asfar Malwāši) is a Mandaean text. It covers Mandaean astrology in great detail. The book is used to obtain a Mandaean's baptismal name (malwasha). It is also an important source on Mandaean numerology.

== Manuscripts and translations ==
An English translation of the text, based on Manuscript 31 of the Drower Collection (DC 31), was published by E. S. Drower in 1949. The manuscript is a kurasa, or unbound manuscript consisting of loose sheets.

Buckley has also located a privately held copy of the Book of the Zodiac dating from 1919, which belonged to Lamea Abbas Amara in San Diego.

There is also a manuscript of the Book of the Zodiac from 1789 CE that is currently held at the Bibliothèque National in Paris, which was used by Drower and may have also been used by Nicolas Siouffi.

== Contents ==
Drower's manuscript (DC 31) consists of 289 pages in Mandaic. There are 20 individual books or sections, which are:

- Book 1: The Book of the Signs of the Zodiac for Men
- Book 2: The Book of the Signs of the Zodiac for Women
- Book 3: The Book of Stars
- Book 4: lists of astrological terms and calculations
- Book 5: The Book of the Moon
- Book 6: charms against evil spirits
- Book 7: charms against evil spirits
- Book 8: The Days of the Month
- Book 9: illnesses
- Book 10: astrological information
- Book 11: selecting days for certain activities
- Book 12: The Opening of a Door
- Book 13: predictions
- Book 14: predictions
- Book 15: predictions
- Book 16: predictions
- Book 17: geographical regions governed by the planets and zodiac signs
- Book 18: predictions
- Book 19: transits of Saturn, halos of the sun, meteors and comets, and rainfall
- Book 20: meteorology

There is also an appendix (labeled as Part II in Drower's text) that discusses omens, predictions, remedies, eclipses, and other topics.

== See also ==
- Ginza Rabba
- Mandaean Book of John
