= Rafid al-Sabti =

Iraqi Mandaean priest in the Netherlands

Rbai Rafid al-Sabti
- الربي رافد السبتي
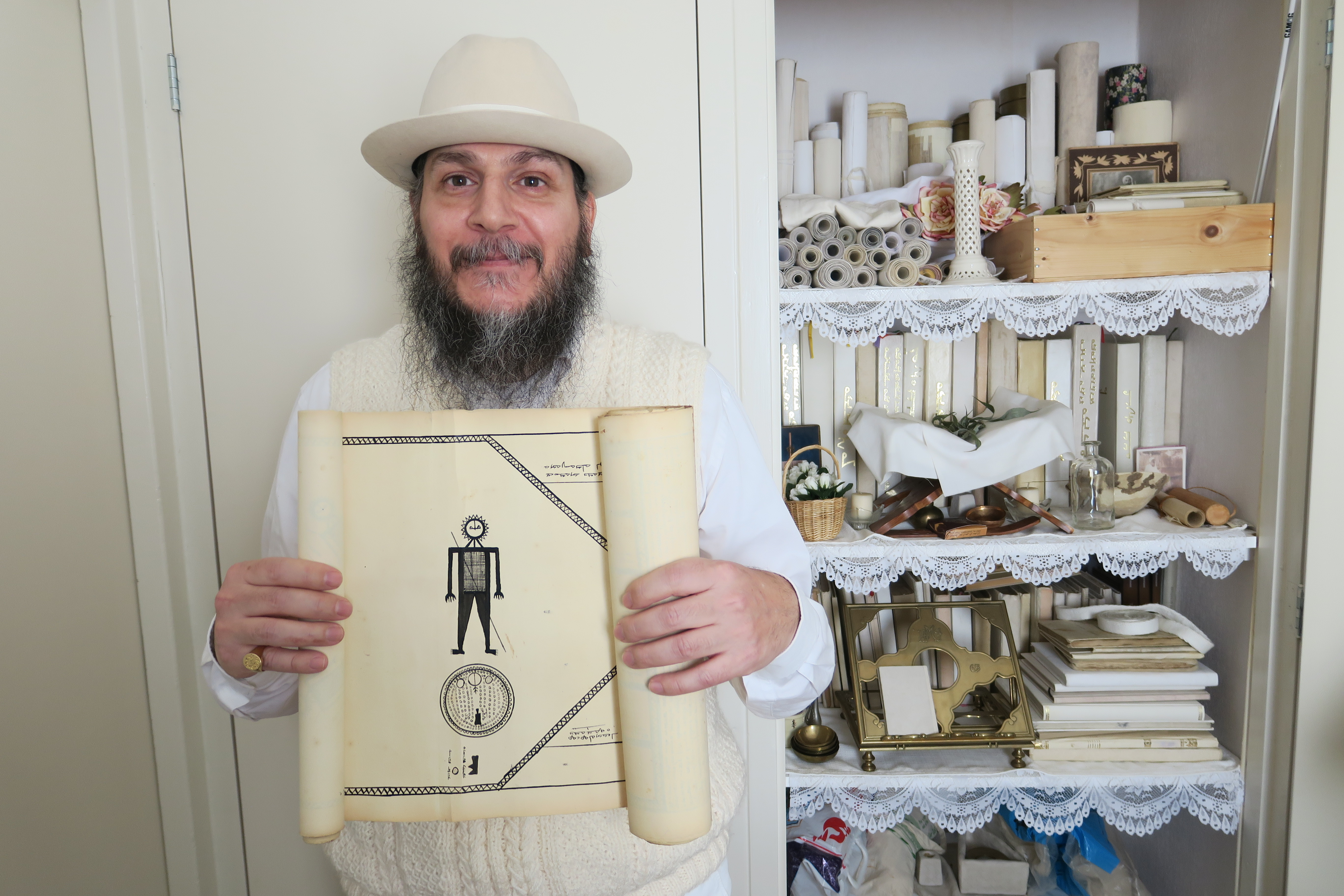
- Rbai Rafid al-Sabti in 2018
- Title: Rabbi

Personal life
- Born: 1965 (age 60–61) Baghdad, Baghdad Governorate, Iraq
- Children: Ardwan Al-Sabti
- Parent: Rishamma Abdullah bar Negm
- Citizenship: Dutch
- Other names: Shaykh Rāfid ibn Shaykh ʿAbdullah ibn Shaykh Najim; Rāfid ʿAbdullah Najim (Rāfid ʻAbd Allāh Naǧm)
- Occupation: Mandaean priest
- Relatives: Sheikh Negm bar Zahroon (grandfather); Ram Zihrun (great-great-grandfather)

Religious life
- Religion: Mandaeism
- Initiation: Tarmida by Abdullah bar Negm

Rbai Rafid al-Sabti, known in full as Rafid al-Rishama Abdallah al-Ganzibra Zahrun al-Rishama Abdallah al-Sabti (Arabic: رافد الريشاما عبدالله الگنزبرا نجم الگنزبرا زهرون الريشاما عبدالله السبتي كنيانا عزيز; born 1965), is an Iraqi-Dutch Mandaean priest in Nijmegen, The Netherlands.

== Biography ==
Al-Sabti was born in 1965 to Rishama Abdullah, son of Sheikh Neǧm, in Baghdad, Iraq. He was initiated into the Mandaean priesthood by his father. Al-Sabti later emigrated to the Netherlands.

Al-Sabti is the custodian of the Rbai Rafid Collection (RRC), a private collection of Mandaean manuscripts held in Nijmegen, The Netherlands. Important manuscripts in the collection include different versions of the Ginza Rabba and a copy of the Alma Rišaia Zuṭa known as Ms. RRC 3F, as well as a qulasta inscribed on lead plates. The collection is being digitized and analyzed in collaboration with Matthew Morgenstern.

== Publications ==
- Mandaean prayer and various rituals (1988) / الصلاة المندائية - وبعض الطقوس الدينية
- Mandaean baptism (1990) / التعميد المندائي
- Masiqta: the ascension and the advancement (2004) / المسقثا - الصعود والارتقاء, ISBN 978-9090181653
- The treasure of Life: The holy book of the Mandaeans (2022), ISBN 978-9090360058 (Ginza Rabba in Mandaic)

== Family ==
His son, Ardwan Al-Sabti, is a researcher and graphic designer known for creating Mandaic fonts.
