= Scroll of the Parwanaya =

Mandaean text

Scroll of the Parwanaya Šarḥ ḏ-Parwanaia
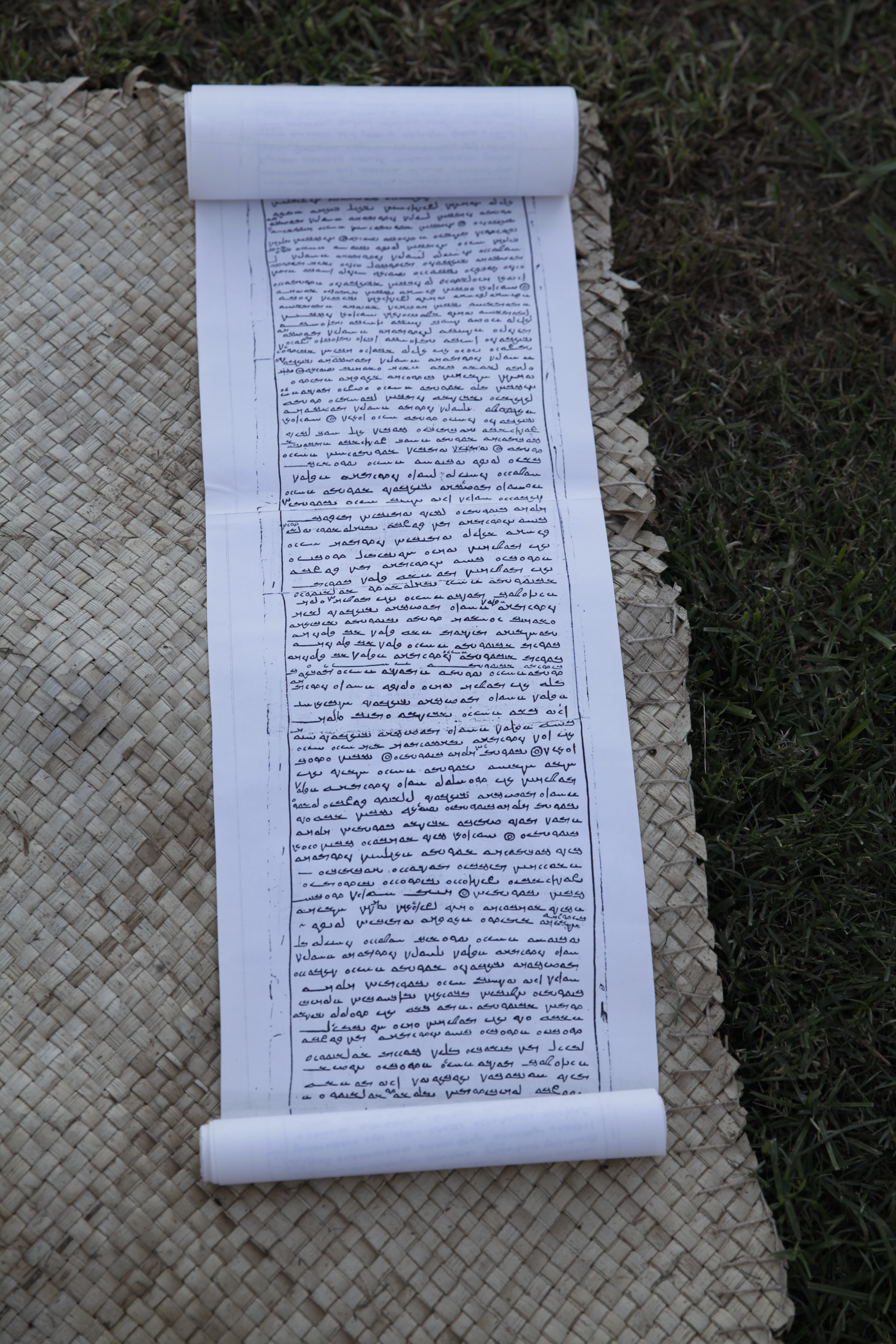
- A photocopy of the Scroll of the Parwanaya used at the 2014 Parwanaya festival in Sydney, Australia

Information
- Religion: Mandaeism
- Language: Mandaic language

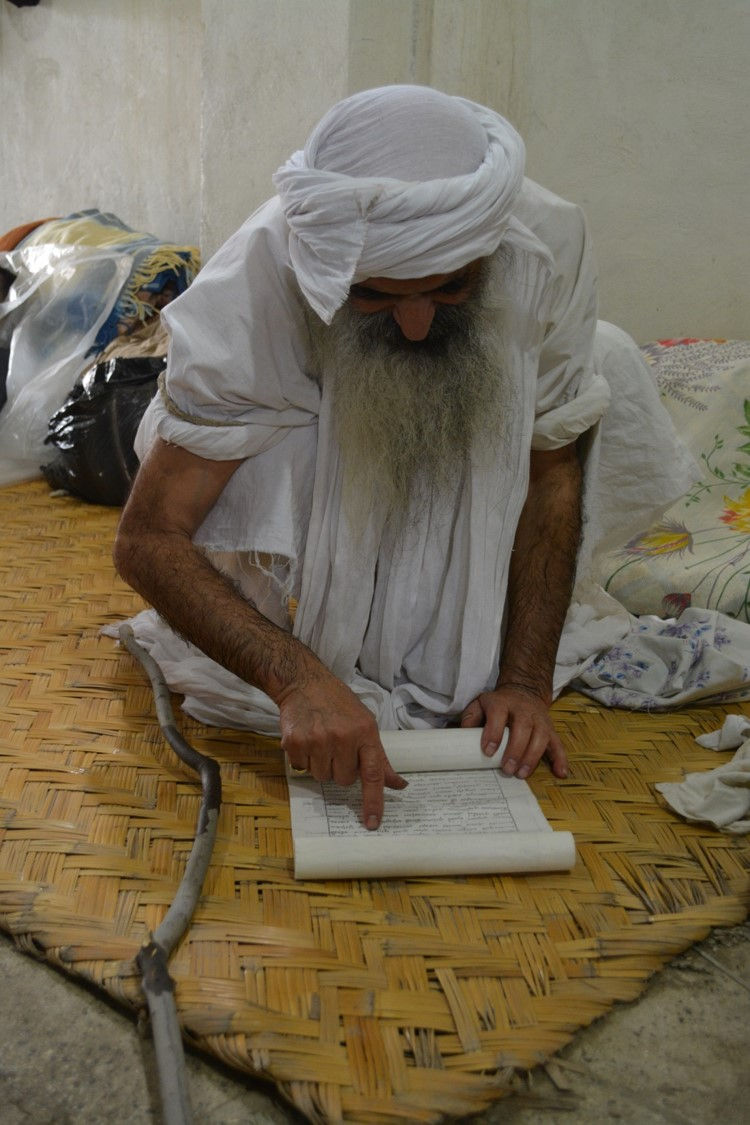
A ganzibra reading the Scroll of the Parwanaya at the 2015 Parwanaya festival in Ahvaz, Iran

The Scroll of the Parwanaya (Classical Mandaic: ࡔࡀࡓࡇ ࡖࡐࡀࡓࡅࡀࡍࡀࡉࡉࡀ Šarḥ ḏ-Parwanaiia) is a Mandaean religious text that describes the rituals of the five-day Parwanaya festival. Excluding the colophon, the text consists of 931 lines.

== Manuscripts and translations ==
Copies of the scroll include Manuscript 24 of the Drower Collection (DC 24), currently held at the Bodleian Library. The scroll was originally copied by Yahya Bihram in 1832 at his sister's son's house in Muhammerah (Khorramshahr), Iran. The scroll was analyzed and translated into German by Bogdan Burtea in 2005.

== Contents ==
The contents of the scroll are as follows.

- Lines 1–81: Ritual preliminaries
- Lines 82–99: šarḥ ḏ-qnasa ḏ-iuna ḏ-paruanaiia (ࡔࡀࡓࡇ ࡖࡒࡍࡀࡎࡀ ࡖࡉࡅࡍࡀ ࡖࡐࡀࡓࡅࡀࡍࡀࡉࡉࡀ) "The dove sacrifice of the Parwanaya"
- Lines 99–243: šarḥ ḏ-dukrana lhdaia rba zadiqa (ࡔࡀࡓࡇ ࡖࡃࡅࡊࡓࡀࡍࡀ ࡋࡄࡃࡀࡉࡀ ࡓࡁࡀ ࡆࡀࡃࡉࡒࡀ) "The memorial of the dead (dukrana) of the only great righteous"
- Lines 244–300: šarḥ ḏ-ahaba ḏ-mania b-iuma ḏ-paruanaiia mandaiia gabra eu enta eu rba eu zuṭa (ࡔࡀࡓࡇ ࡖࡀࡁࡀࡄࡀ ࡖࡌࡀࡍࡉࡀ ࡁࡉࡅࡌࡀ ࡖࡐࡀࡓࡅࡀࡍࡀࡉࡉࡀ ࡌࡀࡍࡃࡀࡉࡉࡀ ࡏࡅ ࡂࡀࡁࡓࡀ ࡏࡅ ࡏࡍࡕࡀ ࡏࡅ ࡓࡁࡀ ࡏࡅ ࡆࡅࡈࡀ) "The offering of the garments on the day of Parwanaya (to all) Mandaeans, man or woman, great or small"
- Lines 301–342: šarḥ ḏ-ahaba ḏ-mania ḏ-tarmida eu ganzibra (ࡔࡀࡓࡇ ࡖࡀࡁࡀࡄࡀ ࡖࡌࡀࡍࡉࡀ ࡖࡕࡀࡓࡌࡉࡀ ࡏࡅ ࡂࡀࡍࡆࡉࡁࡓࡀ) "The offering of the garments of a priest or a ganzibra"
- Lines 343–578: šarḥ ḏ-ṭabahata (ࡔࡀࡓࡇ ࡖࡈࡀࡁࡀࡄࡀࡕࡀ) "The fathers/parents (ṭabahata)"
- Lines 579–806: šarḥ ḏ-dukrana ḏ-sumaiia (ࡔࡀࡓࡇ ࡖࡃࡅࡊࡓࡀࡍࡀ ࡖࡎࡅࡌࡀࡉࡉࡀ) "The remembrance of the dead (dukrana) of the names"
- Lines 807–931: šarḥ ḏ-zidqa brika ḏ-paruanaiia (ࡔࡀࡓࡇ ࡖࡆࡉࡃࡒࡀ ࡁࡓࡉࡊࡀ ࡖࡐࡀࡓࡅࡀࡍࡀࡉࡉࡀ) "The blessed alms of the Parwanaya"
- Lines 932–53v: colophon

== See also ==
- List of Mandaic manuscripts
- Parwanaya
