= Kurt Rudolph =

German religious studies scholar (1929–2020)

- Born: 3 April 1929; Dresden, Weimar Republic
- Died: 13 May 2020 (aged 91); Germany
- Occupation: Professor

Academic background
- Education: Leipzig University

Academic work
- Institutions: University of Leipzig, University of Marburg
- Doctoral students: Bogdan Burtea
- Main interests: Mandaeism; Gnosticism

Kurt Rudolph (3 April 1929 – 13 May 2020) was a German researcher of Gnosticism and Mandaeism.

== Education ==
Born in Dresden, Rudolph studied Protestant theology, religion, history and Semitology at the universities of Greifswald and Leipzig in the years 1948 to 1953. Subsequently, for six years, he was research assistant while he worked in parallel towards doctorates in theology and religious history. In 1961, he received his habilitation in religious history and comparative religion.

== Career ==
During his work at universities in Leipzig, Chicago, Marburg and Santa Barbara, he acquired an international reputation as an expert in Gnosticism and Mandaeism. He also occupied himself with Islam and methodological questions in religious studies.

His priority was the creation of a religious studies discipline that was independent of theology. Rudolph stressed that religious studies must be a rational science and be subjected to methodological atheism. This theory, which was initially fiercely contested in German religious studies, has become largely a matter of consensus.

After his retirement in 1994, Rudolph received honorary doctorates from Aarhus University and Leipzig University. In his later years, he lived in Marburg.

== Works ==
- Die Mandäer I - Das Mandäerproblem. Vandenhoek, 1960.
- Die Mandäer II - Der Kult. Vandenhoek, 1961.
- Theogonie, Kosmogonie und Anthropogonie in den mandäischen Schriften. Vandenhoeck, 1965. ISBN 3-525-53182-6.
- Die Gnosis - Wesen und Geschichte einer spätantiken Religion. Leipzig, 1977 (4th edition: Vandenhoeck, 2005). ISBN 978-3-525-52110-6.
- Mandaeism. Leiden: Brill, 1978. ISBN 90-04-05252-6.
- Gnosis und Spätantike Religionsgeschichte. Brill, 1997. ISBN 90-04-10625-1. (collected essays)
