= The Thousand and Twelve Questions =

Religious text of Mandaeism

The Thousand and Twelve Questions Alf Trisar Šuialia

Information
- Religion: Mandaeism
- Language: Mandaic language

The Thousand and Twelve Questions (Classical Mandaic: ࡀࡋࡐ ࡕࡓࡉࡎࡀࡓ ࡔࡅࡉࡀࡋࡉࡀ Alf Trisar Šuialia; Modern Mandaic: Alf Tressar Ešyāli) is a Mandaean religious text. The 1012 Questions is one of the most detailed texts on Mandaean priestly rituals. It is kept by Mandaean priests in the shkinta during certain rituals.

The text contains detailed commentaries on Mandaean religious rituals, such as death masses (masiqta) to help guide souls into the World of Light, and the Mandaean wedding ceremony. It is written as a scroll. A detailed overview of the contents can be found in Drower (1941).

== Manuscripts and translations ==
An English translation of the text was published by E. S. Drower in 1960, which was based on manuscript 36 of the Drower Collection (abbreviated DC 36). DC 6 is an incomplete manuscript of The Thousand and Twelve Questions in the Drower Collection missing books 1 and 2, but DC 36 is the complete version with all 7 books included.

Manuscripts from the Rbai Rafid Collection (RRC) that correspond to parts of Alf Trisar Šuialia (DC 36) are:

- RRC 2M: Diuan Mhita u-Asuta ("Blow and Healing"). Copied by Zihrun br Yahia Sam in 1086 A.H. (1675–1676 A.D.). Longest RRC manuscript. Contains Neo-Mandaic features.
- RRC 3R: Tafsir u-Afrašta Kasita. Copied in 1173 A.H. (1759–1760 A.D.). Transliterated text published online in the Comprehensive Aramaic Lexicon.
- RRC 6D: Sigia ḏ-Dihbaiia. Copied in Šuštar in 1085 A.H. (1674–1675 A.D.).

== Contents ==
Contents of the 7 parts of the 1012 Questions:

- Book 1 (contains 207 sections)
  - Part 1: The Questions which Shishlam-Rba and Hibil-Ziwa asked of their father Nbaṭ (a diwan; title as mentioned in section 201, p. 158)
  - Part 2: The explanation of the body (Tafsir Pagra)
- Book 2 (contains 442 sections)
  - Part 3.1: Accidental impurity and its cure
  - Part 3.2: "The Three"
  - Part 4: The agreed form of the masiqta of Shitil; of the Ṭabahata and of the Dukrania
  - Part 5.1: Blow and healing (i.e., ritual errors and how to correct them)
  - Part 5.2: The celebration of the marriage of Shishlam-Rba, son of Lihdaia-Rba-Zadiqa
  - Part 6.1: Burial
  - Part 6.2: Of postulants and priesthood
  - Part 7: Concerning the postulant's first baptism – admonitions (similar to lines 970–1042 in the Scroll of Exalted Kingship)

== Parallels in other religions ==
The 1012 Questions has various similarities to Jewish mysticism and Kabbalah.

== See also ==
- Ginza Rabba
- Mandaean Book of John
