= Comprehensive Aramaic Lexicon =

Online dictionary of Aramaic

The Comprehensive Aramaic Lexicon
- Type of project: Open access
- Location: United States
- Owner: Hebrew Union College
- Established: 1980s
- Website: cal.huc.edu

The Comprehensive Aramaic Lexicon (CAL) is an online database containing a searchable dictionary and text corpora of Aramaic dialects. CAL includes more than 3 million lexically parsed words.

The project was started in the 1980s and is currently hosted by the Jewish Institute of Religion at the Hebrew Union College in Cincinnati, Ohio.

== Dialects ==
CAL includes the following Aramaic dialects and texts.

- Old Aramaic
- Imperial Aramaic
- Biblical Aramaic
- Qumran Aramaic: fragments of Daniel, a "targum" of verses in Leviticus, and Qumran Targum Job
- Jewish Literary Aramaic: Targums Onqelos, Jonathan to the Prophets
- Palestinian Targumic Aramaic: Targum Neofiti, Fragment Targums, Cairo Genizah fragments
- Jewish Palestinian Aramaic
- Syriac
  - Old Testament Peshitta (including Old Testament Apocrypha)
  - New Testament Peshitta and Old Syriac Gospels
- Christian Palestinian Aramaic (CPA)
- Jewish Babylonian Aramaic
- Mandaic (curated by Matthew Morgenstern and Ohad Abudraham)
- Late Jewish Literary Aramaic: Targum Pseudo-Jonathan to the Pentateuch, all Targums to the Hagiographa
- Samaritan Aramaic: Targum J

== See also ==
- Hebrew and Aramaic Lexicon of the Old Testament
- Canaanite and Aramaic inscriptions
