= Matthew Morgenstern =

British-Israeli professor

- משה מורגנשטרן
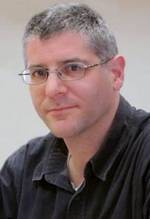
- Morgenstern in 2014
- Born: 1968 (age 57–58); London, England, United Kingdom
- Occupation: Professor

Academic background
- Education: University of Cambridge (BA); Hebrew University of Jerusalem (PhD)
- Thesis: The Aramaic Language in the Responsa of the Babylonian Geonim (2002)

Academic work
- Institutions: Tel Aviv University
- Main interests: Aramaic; Mandaeism

Matthew Morgenstern, also known as Moshe Morgenstern (Hebrew: משה מורגנשטרן; born 1968), is an Israeli linguist and religious studies scholar known for his work on Eastern Aramaic languages, especially Mandaic. He is currently Full Professor in the Department of Hebrew Language and Semitic Linguistics at Tel Aviv University.

== Education ==
Matthew Morgenstern was born in London in 1968. He obtained his BA degree in Social and Political Science from the University of Cambridge in 1990. In 1992, he received his Master of Arts degree in Aramaic Bible Translation from the Department of Hebrew and Jewish Studies at University College London. In the same year, he immigrated to Israel.

In Israel, he studied at the Hebrew University of Jerusalem, where he first obtained a Master of Arts degree in Hebrew Language in 1996. As a masters student, he was part of a research group that worked on the Dead Sea Scrolls. Morgenstern continued his doctoral studies at the Hebrew University of Jerusalem, where he received his doctorate (summa cum laude) in 2002 and completed a thesis titled The Aramaic Language in the Responsa of the Babylonian Geonim.

== Career ==
From 2002 to 2013, he performed research and taught at the University of Haifa. From 2011 to 2012, he spent a sabbatical as a visiting professor at the Free University of Berlin. Today, he is employed as a full professor in the Department of Hebrew Culture at Tel Aviv University.

== Research ==
Matthew Morgenstern is engaged in various fields of Semitic studies, especially Aramaic studies. His main focus is on Eastern Aramaic dialects, especially Jewish Babylonian Aramaic and Classical Mandaic. He is involved in the study of Mandaean manuscripts, as well as the photography, digitization, transcription, and translation of incantation bowls and amulets.

Morgenstern is currently working on a new dictionary of Mandaic, as well as on the digitization, transcription, and analysis of various Mandaic manuscripts. Since 2013, he has collaborated with Rafid al-Sabti to archive and digitize the Rbai Rafid Collection (RRC).

== Organizations ==
In 2013, Matthew Morgenstern co-founded the Society for Mandaean Studies, of which he is an elected board member.

== Books ==
- Morgenstern, Matthew (2011). Studies in Jewish Babylonian Aramaic: based upon early Eastern manuscripts. Winona Lake, Ind: Eisenbrauns. ISBN 978-1-57506-938-8. OCLC 673419642.
- Ford, James Nathan; Morgenstern, Matthew (2020). Aramaic Incantation Bowls in Museum Collections. Brill. doi:10.1163/9789004411838. ISBN 978-90-04-41183-8. S2CID 203191491.
