= Choheili family =

Mandaean family

Choheili family ࡊࡅࡄࡀࡉࡋࡉࡀ Kuhailia, Kuhaili, Al-Kuhaili, Chohaili, Chohili
- Family
- Country: Iran and Iraq
- Current region: Khuzestan and Lower Mesopotamia
- Origin: Iran and Iraq
- Members: Jabbar Choheili, Salah Choheili, Najah Choheili, Salem Choheili, Brikha Nasoraia
- Connected members: Taleb Doraji
- Connected families: Khaffagi family
- Traditions: Mandaean priestly family

Choheili or Chohaili (Persian: چحیلی; Arabic: الكحيلي, Al-Kuhaili or Al-Kuhailia; Modern Mandaic: ࡊࡅࡄࡀࡉࡋࡉࡀ, romanized: Kuhailia) is an Iranian and Iraqi Mandaean surname or family name. The Choheili (Kuhailia) family has produced many Mandaean priests. Notable people with the surname include:

- Jabbar Choheili (1923–2014), Mandaean priest from Iran
- Salah Choheili (born 1952), Mandaean priest in Australia
- Najah Choheili, Mandaean priest in Iran
- Salem Choheili (born 1935), a shganda and yalufa (learned Mandaean layman) in Ahvaz, Iran

Mandaean priest and professor Brikha Nasoraia also belongs to the Choheili family. Ganzibra Taleb Doraji of Ahvaz is also connected to the Choheili family. Members of the Choheili family can trace their ancestry back to Adam Zakia, the father of Bihram Bar-Hiia, who lived around 1500 A.D.

19th-century Mandaean priest Yahya Bihram's uncle Yahya Yuhana, of the Kuhailia (Choheili) clan, was a prominent copyist and ganzibra.

== In Mandaean colophons ==
Kuhailia scribes from the 15th to 17th centuries who are mentioned in the colophons of Mandaean texts include:

- Baktiar br Adam Mhatam, Kuhailia
- Bihram BrHiia br Adam Zakia, Kuhailia (the elder, fl. 1400s; one of the earliest known ancestors of the Kuhailia clan
- Bihram BrHiia br (Adam) Baktiar, Kuhailia (the younger; nephew of Bihram BrHiia, above)
- Mhatam Zihrun br Baktiar/Yahia BrHiia, Kuhailia (husband of Yasmin Mudalal; uncle of Bihram BrHiia the elder)
- Ram Kuhailia (fl. 1560)
- Ram Yuhana br Yahia Baktiar, Kuhailia (c. 1580)
- Yahia Yuhana br Ram, Kuhailia (brother of Zakia Zihrun; fl. 1600s)
- Zakia Zihrun br Ram Kuhailia (brother of Yahia Yuhana br Ram; fl. 1677)
- Yahia br Adam Kuhailia

== Neo-Mandaic ==
Most prominent members of the Choheili family (including Rishama Salah Choheili and Salem Choheili), along with their family members, are fluent native speakers of Neo-Mandaic.

== See also ==
- List of Mandaean priests
- Khaffagi family
