= Najah Choheili =

Iranian Mandaean priest

Ganzibra Najah Choheili
- نجاح چحیلی
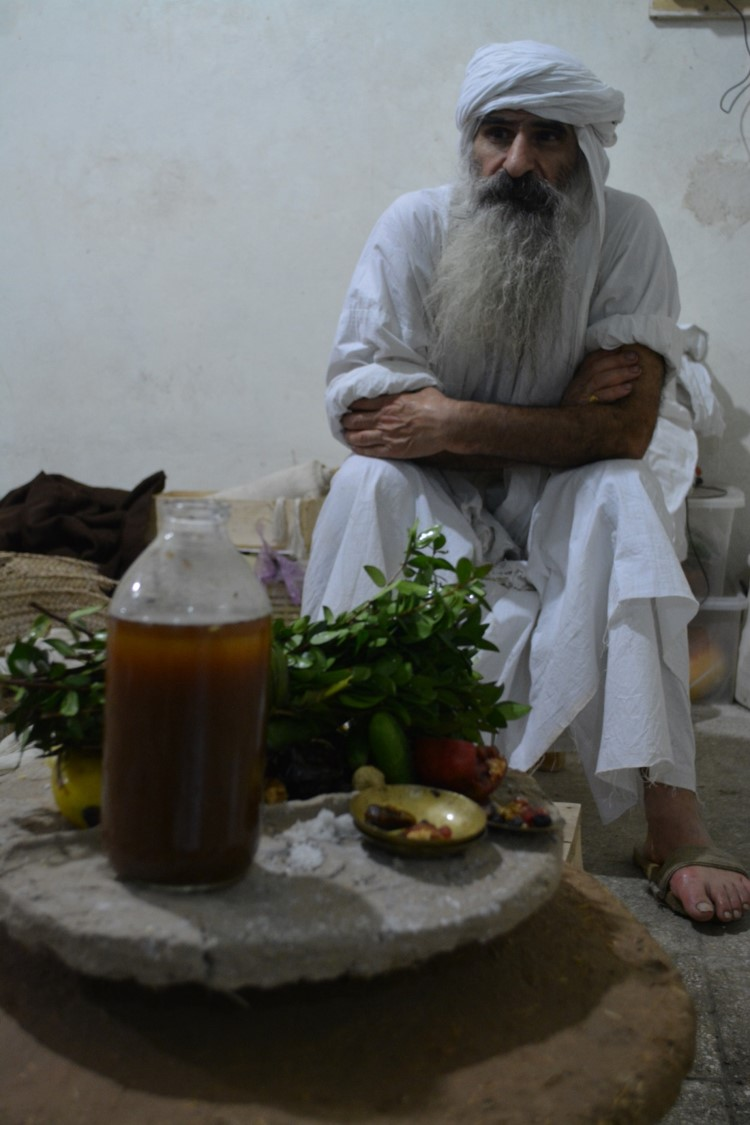
- Ganzibra Najah Choheili getting ready to prepare the zidqa brikha (2015)
- Title: Ganzibra

Personal life
- Born: Ahvaz, Iran
- Parent: Jabbar Choheili (father)
- Citizenship: Iranian
- Other name: Najah al-Kuhaili
- Occupation: Head of the Mandaean Council of Ahvaz
- Relatives: Salah Choheili (brother)

Religious life
- Religion: Mandaeism

Ganzibra Najah Choheili (Persian: نجاح چحیلی) is an Iranian Mandaean priest who currently serves as the head of the Mandaean community in Iran.

== Biography ==
Najah Choheili was born in Ahvaz, Iran into the Kuhailia (Persian pronunciation: Choheili) family. His father was Ganzibra Jabbar Choheili, while his brother is Salah Choheili, who is currently the Rishama of the Mandaean community in Australia.

He currently serves as the head of the Mandaean Council of Ahvaz and is the head of the Mandaean community in Iran.

== See also ==
- Jabbar Choheili
- Salah Choheili
- Salem Choheili
- Taleb Doraji
- Mandaean Council of Ahvaz
