= Salem Choheili =

Iranian Mandaean scribe

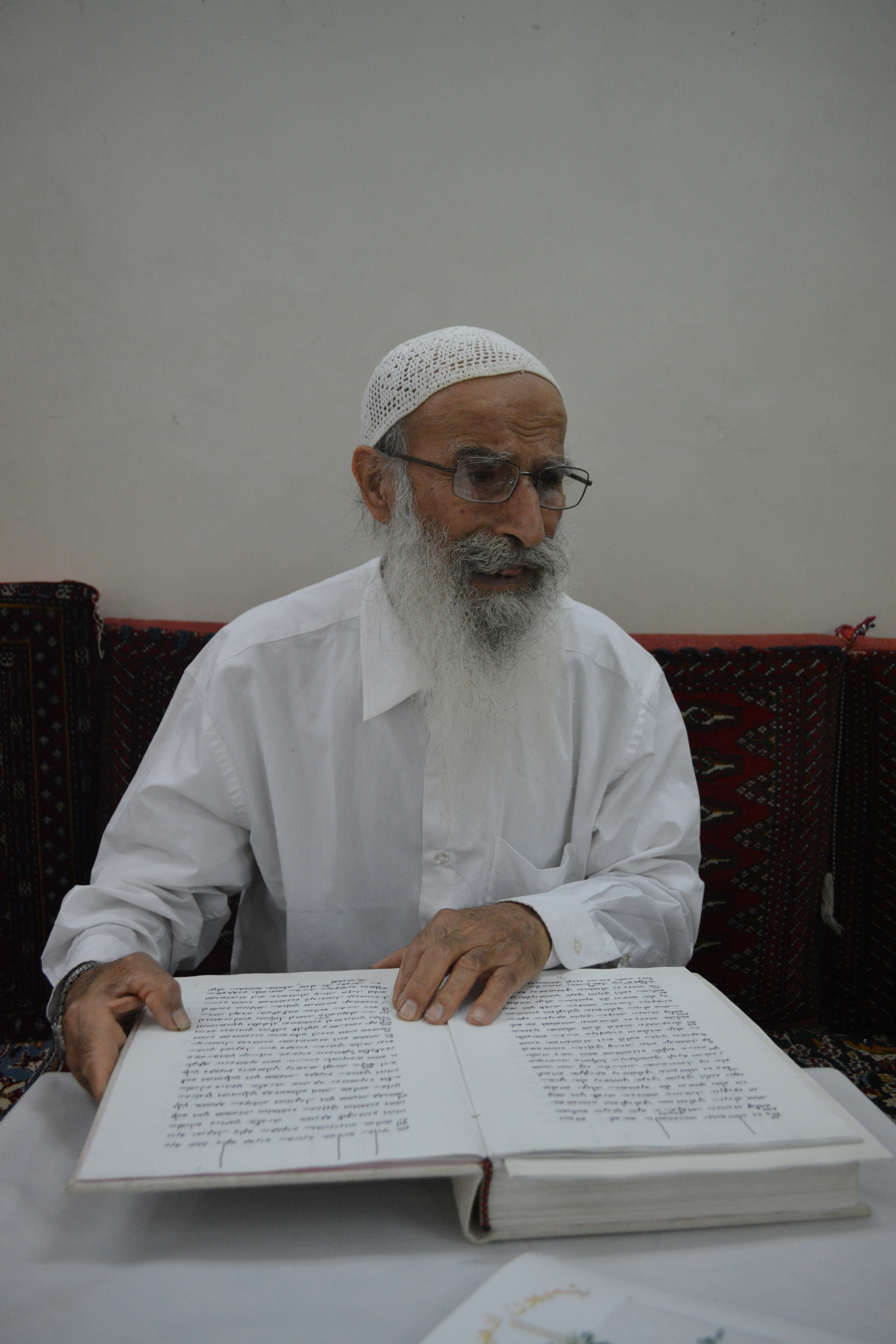
- Salem Choheili reading the Left Ginza in 2015
- Born: 1935 (age 90–91); Ahvaz, Iran
- Other name: Bayan bar Šarat
- Occupations: Scribe, teacher, author
- Organization: Mandaean Council of Ahvaz
- Notable work: Mandaean Book of John manuscript (1989); Ginza Rabba (2021, Persian translation)
- Title: Shganda

Šganda Salem Choheili (Persian: سالم چحیلی; born 1935 in Ahvaz, Iran) is an Iranian Mandaean scribe, teacher, and author. He is also a shganda and yalufa (learned Mandaean layman) and is one of the leaders of the Mandaean Council of Ahvaz. Salem Choheili is a fully fluent speaker of Neo-Mandaic.

== Biography ==
Salem Choheili was born in Ahvaz, Iran in 1935 into the Kuhailia (Persian pronunciation: Choheili) family. His Mandaean baptismal name is Bayan bar Šarat (Classical Mandaic: ࡁࡀࡉࡀࡍ ࡁࡓ ࡔࡀࡓࡀࡕ, romanized: Baian br Šarat, lit. 'Bayan, son of Šarat', Modern Mandaic pronunciation: [baˈjan bar ˈʃarat]).

As a child, he learned to speak colloquial Mandaic from his parents. Salem Choheili later served as Slovak linguist Rudolf Macúch's primary Neo-Mandaic linguistic informant in 1989, as well as a guide for Norwegian-American scholar Jorunn Jacobsen Buckley during her 1996 field trip to Iran.

After serving in the Iranian military, Salem Choheili focused on transcribing Mandaic manuscripts. On April 12, 1989, he finished copying a handwritten manuscript of the Mandaean Book of John. Dr. Sinan Abdullah, the son of physicist Abdul Jabbar Abdullah, brought a photocopy of the manuscript to Niskayuna, New York, United States, which was later transferred to Colonie, New York.

In addition to publishing Mandaean scriptures printed in the original Mandaic alphabet, Salem Choheili has written various Persian-language books on Mandaean history, religion, and language. In 2021 (1400 S.H.), he completed a Persian translation of the Ginza Rabba.

Although not a formally ordained Mandaean priest, Salem Choheili serves as a shganda (priestly assistant) in the Iranian Mandaean community and is currently a member of the Mandaean Council of Ahvaz. He has taught Mandaic to Iranian Mandaeans for decades and runs a Mandaic language school in Ahvaz.

== Family ==
As a member of the Choheili family, his relatives include Jabbar Choheili (1923–2014), Salah Choheili, and Najah Choheili.
