= Abdul Jabbar Abdullah =

Iraqi physicist and meteorologist

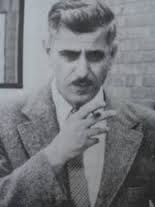
- Abdul Jabbar Abdullah
- Born: 1911; Qal'at Saleh, Ottoman Iraq
- Died: July 9, 1969 (aged 57–58); Albany, New York, USA
- Education: Massachusetts Institute of Technology
- Known for: Cloud stratification
- Spouse: Kismet Inaissi al-Fayadh (m. 1943)
- Children: Sinan Abdullah; Haitham Abdullah
- Father: Abdullah bar Sam
- Scientific career
- Fields: Wave theory, Meteorology
- Workplaces: University of Baghdad; Massachusetts Institute of Technology; New York University; National Center for Atmospheric Research

Abdul Jabbar Abdullah Sam (Arabic: عبد الجبار عبد الله سام; 1911 – July 9, 1969) was an Iraqi physicist, dynamical meteorologist, and President Emeritus of the University of Baghdad. Abdullah obtained a doctorate in meteorology at the Massachusetts Institute of Technology in 1946 before returning to Iraq to become an educator and researcher. After several years as the President of the University of Baghdad, Abdullah left Iraq amid a period of social unrest, and lived in the United States for the remainder of his life.

== Early life and education ==
Abdul Jabbar was born in 1911 to a Mandaean priestly family in the town of Qal'at Saleh, Qal'at Saleh District, Maysan Province (formerly Al-Amaarah) in southeastern Iraq. His father was Ganzibra Abdullah, son of Ganzibra Sam (d. 1981 in Baghdad; also known as Abdallah bar Sam; Mandaean baptismal name: Adam Zihrun bar Sam). Ganzibra Abdullah bar Sam was a Mandaean priest from the Manduia and ‛Kuma families who initiated Jabbar Choheili into the priesthood in 1948, and Salah Choheili in 1976. Ganzibra Abdallah also copied the Ginza Rabba by hand in 1928; as of 2010, that copy of the Ginza Rabba belonged to the Elmanahi family in New York state, United States.

He studied in his hometown elementary school, built during the British rule in Iraq. Upon finishing his secondary school education in Baghdad, he left for Lebanon to attend university. There he enrolled at the American University of Beirut (AUB) where he majored in physics and graduated with a BS in 1934. He subsequently pursued his postgraduate studies at the Massachusetts Institute of Technology (MIT), where he earned his PhD, supervised by Bernhard Haurwitz.

== Career ==
In 1949, Abdullah returned to Iraq and joined the faculty of The Higher Normal College, where he served as chairman of the physics department. When the college, along with other Iraqi universities, was consolidated into the University of Baghdad, Abdullah was a member of the Founding Council, which oversaw the unification process. In the aftermath of the 14 July Revolution in 1958, the Founding Council was replaced with a permanent University Council, and Abdullah was named the first president of the University of Baghdad.

Abdullah was imprisoned during the February 1963 coup d'état in Iraq by the revolting Ba'ath forces, who charged him with being a political dissident. He was released from jail in October, although the charges were not dropped until several years later. Owing to mounting international pressure, he was eventually allowed to leave the country, and went to the United States. He took a position as a meteorology researcher at the National Center for Atmospheric Research in Boulder, Colorado.

In 1966, Abdullah joined the faculty of the Atmospheric Science department at the State University of New York at Albany. Shortly thereafter, he became ill with Hodgkin lymphoma. He died at the Albany Medical Center on July 9, 1969.

== Personal life ==
He married Kismet Inaissi al-Fayadh in 1943, with whom he had a daughter and three sons. His two twin sons, Sinan Abdullah and Haitham Abdullah (born 1947), were the first Mandaeans born in the United States. Sinan Abdullah is a dentist in Niskayuna, New York and owned various Mandaean manuscripts that were analyzed by Jorunn Jacobsen Buckley.

== Legacy ==
Abdullah is highly regarded in Iraq, where his 100th birthday was commemorated in the diaspora. A hall in the University of Baghdad is named after him, as well as numerous streets in the city.

Nuclear physicist Khidir Hamza cites Abdullah as a mentor, and credits him with helping Hamza obtain admission into MIT to pursue a master's degree in nuclear engineering after Hamza's initial rejection. Hamza later became part of Iraq's nuclear research program, before defecting to the United States and testifying on the program before the U.S. Senate.

== Research ==
Abdullah published research on subjects regarding cloud stratification, solitary waves, and pressure pumps.

== Bibliography ==
Abdullah has published multiple books on atmospheric sciences, and was the editor and publisher of Iraq's sole science journal in the 1950s, Proceedings of the Iraqi Scientific Society.

=== Books ===
- Abdul Jabbar Abdullah, James J. O'Brien. Internal Gravity Waves of Finite Amplitude in a Stratified Incompressible Atmosphere: a Quasi-characteristic Method. National Center for Atmospheric Research.
- Abdul Jabbar Abdullah. On the Dynamics of Hurricanes. New York University, 1953.
- Abdul Jabbar Abdullah. Group-velocity of Atmospheric Waves. Massachusetts Institute of Technology, 1946.
