= Huntington MS 6 =

Mandaic manuscript

- Bodleian Library
- Also known as: Hunt. 6
- Type: Codex
- Date: 1615
- Place of origin: Basra
- Language(s): Mandaic
- Scribe(s): Adam Paraš, son of Zihrun
- Material: Leatherbound
- Size: 12 × 16 × 3 inches
- Condition: Contains water damage and holes
- Script: Mandaic
- Contents: Ginza Rabba

Huntington MS 6 (abbreviated Hunt. 6) is a Mandaic manuscript of the Ginza Rabba currently held at the Bodleian Library, Oxford. It was acquired by Robert Huntington in the 17th century.

The contents of the manuscript remain unpublished. Its colophons have been studied in detail by Jorunn Jacobsen Buckley.

== Description ==
Huntington MS 6 is a large leatherbound codex with 536 pages that measures approximately 12 by 16 by 3 inches. Many of the pages have been stained by water and contain holes. It was copied by Adam Paraš, son of Zihrun in Basra in 1615.

Unlike most other Ginza Rabba codices, the Right Ginza and Left Ginza are not bound upside down to each other, so there is no need to flip the book when one switches from the Right to Left Ginza or vice versa.

== See also ==
- List of Mandaic manuscripts
- Codex Marshall 691
- Ginza Rabba
