= Codex Marshall 691 =

Mandaic manuscript

- Bodleian Library
- Also known as: Marsh. 691
- Type: Codex
- Date: September 5, 1529
- Place of origin: Huwayza, Safavid Iran
- Language(s): Mandaic
- Scribe(s): Adam Zihrun, son of Bihram Šitlan (Adam Zihrun bar Bihram Šitlan)
- Material: Leatherbound
- Size: 4 × 5 inches
- Script: Mandaic
- Contents: Mandaean prayers

Codex Marshall 691 (abbreviated Marsh. 691) is a Mandaic manuscript currently held at the Bodleian Library, Oxford. It is the oldest Mandaic manuscript that is currently held at a European institutional library and is a prayerbook containing dozens of Mandaean prayers. The contents of the manuscript remain unpublished. Its colophons have been studied in detail by Jorunn Jacobsen Buckley.

== Description ==
Codex Marshall 691 is a small leatherbound codex with 116 pages that measures approximately 4 inches by 5 inches. As a prayerbook ("Qulasta"), it contains various Mandaean prayers, including the rahmia. According to its colophons, it was copied in September 5, 1529 A.D., in Huwayza by Adam Zihrun, son of Bihram Šitlan.

Thomas Marshall's servant had donated the book (obtained by Marshall via Dutch merchants) to the Bodleian Library in 1689 or 1690, after Marshall's death in 1685.

The codex contains three colophons. In the third colophon of the codex, a blessing is given to Sayyid (Sultan) Badran (whose rule began in 1514) and his family, the Musha'sha' Shi'ite/Ghulat ruler of Khuzestan during the Safavid dynasty. Blessings given to Muslim rulers are rarely found in Mandaean colophons.

== See also ==
- List of Mandaic manuscripts
- Qulasta
- List of Qulasta prayers
- Huntington MS 6
