= West Bath, Maine =

Town in Maine, United States

- Town
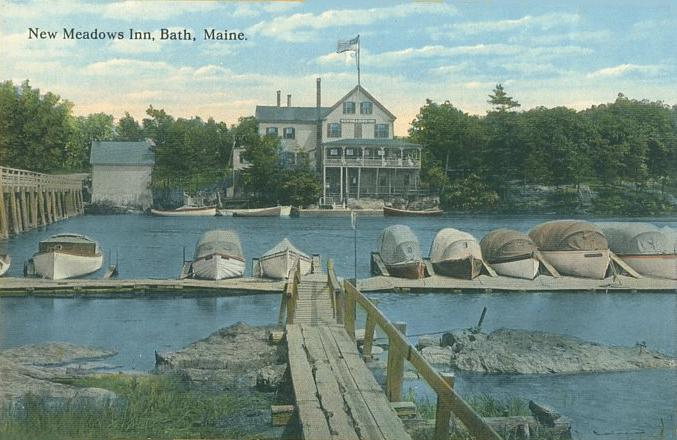
- New Meadows Inn, New Meadows River, 1915

- Seal

- Location within Maine Location within the United States
- Coordinates: 43°52′30″N 69°52′40″W
- Country: United States
- State: Maine
- County: Sagadahoc
- Incorporated: 1844

Area
  - Total: 15.00 sq mi (38.85 km^{2})
  - Land: 11.90 sq mi (30.82 km^{2})
  - Water: 3.10 sq mi (8.03 km^{2})
- Elevation: 0 ft (0 m)

Population (2020)
  - Total: 1,910
  - Density: 160/sq mi (62/km^{2})
- Time zone: UTC-5 (Eastern (EST))
  - Summer (DST): UTC-4 (EDT)
- ZIP code: 04530
- Area code: 207
- FIPS code: 23-81930
- GNIS feature ID: 582801
- Website: www.westbath.org

West Bath is a town in Sagadahoc County, Maine, United States. The population was 1,910 at the 2020 census. A sub-locality of West Bath is Winnegance. West Bath is part of the Portland-South Portland-Biddeford metropolitan area.

== History ==
Winnegance Carrying Place, located between Winnegance Creek on the Kennebec River and Winnegance Bay on the New Meadows River, was a busy canoe portage for the Kennebec Abenaki people. The area was first a portion of Georgetown, incorporated in 1716, then of Bath, incorporated in 1781. West Bath was set off and incorporated as a town on February 14, 1844. When the population was 603 in 1858, industries included a gristmill, sawmill and clapboard, shingle and lath machines. West Bath is today a suburb of Bath and Brunswick.

== Geography ==
According to the United States Census Bureau, the town has a total area of 15.00 square miles (38.85 km^{2}), of which 11.90 square miles (30.82 km^{2}) is land and 3.10 square miles (8.03 km^{2}) is water. Situated on part of a peninsula, West Bath is drained by Winnegance Creek and the New Meadows River estuary.

The town is crossed by U. S. Route 1. It borders the city of Bath to the northeast, town of Phippsburg to the southeast, and (separated by the New Meadows River) is near the towns of Harpswell to the southwest, and Brunswick to the northwest.

== Demographics ==
Historical population
Census	Pop.	Note	%±
1850	603		—
1860	400		−33.7%
1870	373		−6.7%
1880	315		−15.5%
1890	307		−2.5%
1900	291		−5.2%
1910	230		−21.0%
1920	313		36.1%
1930	277		−11.5%
1940	353		27.4%
1950	578		63.7%
1960	766		32.5%
1970	836		9.1%
1980	1,309		56.6%
1990	1,716		31.1%
2000	1,798		4.8%
2010	1,877		4.4%
2020	1,910		1.8%
U.S. Decennial Census

=== 2010 census ===
As of the census of 2010, there were 1,877 people, 817 households, and 570 families residing in the town. The population density was 157.7 inhabitants per square mile (60.9/km^{2}). There were 1,116 housing units at an average density of 93.8 per square mile (36.2/km^{2}). The racial makeup of the town was 97.2% White, 0.5% African American, 0.7% Native American, 0.5% Asian, 0.1% Pacific Islander, 0.2% from other races, and 0.8% from two or more races. Hispanic or Latino of any race were 0.8% of the population.

There were 817 households, of which 25.3% had children under the age of 18 living with them, 55.2% were married couples living together, 10.4% had a female householder with no husband present, 4.2% had a male householder with no wife present, and 30.2% were non-families. 24.5% of all households were made up of individuals, and 8.5% had someone living alone who was 65 years of age or older. The average household size was 2.29 and the average family size was 2.69.

The median age in the town was 47.7 years. 19.1% of residents were under the age of 18; 6.1% were between the ages of 18 and 24; 20.1% were from 25 to 44; 36.8% were from 45 to 64; and 17.9% were 65 years of age or older. The gender makeup of the town was 47.9% male and 52.1% female.

=== 2000 census ===
As of the census of 2000, there were 1,798 people, 750 households, and 536 families residing in the town. The population density was 152.2 inhabitants per square mile (58.8/km^{2}). There were 983 housing units at an average density of 83.2 per square mile (32.1/km^{2}). The racial makeup of the town was 98.22% White, 0.33% African American, 0.39% Native American, 0.33% Asian, 0.22% from other races, and 0.50% from two or more races. Hispanic or Latino of any race were 0.44% of the population.

There were 750 households, out of which 28.5% had children under the age of 18 living with them, 60.3% were married couples living together, 7.7% had a female householder with no husband present, and 28.4% were non-families. 23.2% of all households were made up of individuals, and 6.8% had someone living alone who was 65 years of age or older. The average household size was 2.39 and the average family size was 2.80.

In the town, the population was spread out, with 22.5% under the age of 18, 5.3% from 18 to 24, 27.7% from 25 to 44, 32.2% from 45 to 64, and 12.2% who were 65 years of age or older. The median age was 42 years. For every 100 females, there were 99.6 males. For every 100 females age 18 and over, there were 101.3 males.

The median income for a household in the town was $45,326, and the median income for a family was $52,986. Males had a median income of $34,375 versus $27,448 for females. The per capita income for the town was $23,022. About 4.0% of families and 6.6% of the population were below the poverty line, including 9.0% of those under age 18 and 4.4% of those age 65 or over.

== Education ==
West Bath is home to one elementary school, West Bath Elementary School.

== Sites of interest ==
- Hamilton Sanctuary – Maine Audubon Society

== Notable people ==
- Jorunn Jacobsen Buckley, professor
- Thomas Buckley, anthropologist
