= Qal'at Saleh =

Qal'at Saleh قلعة صالح
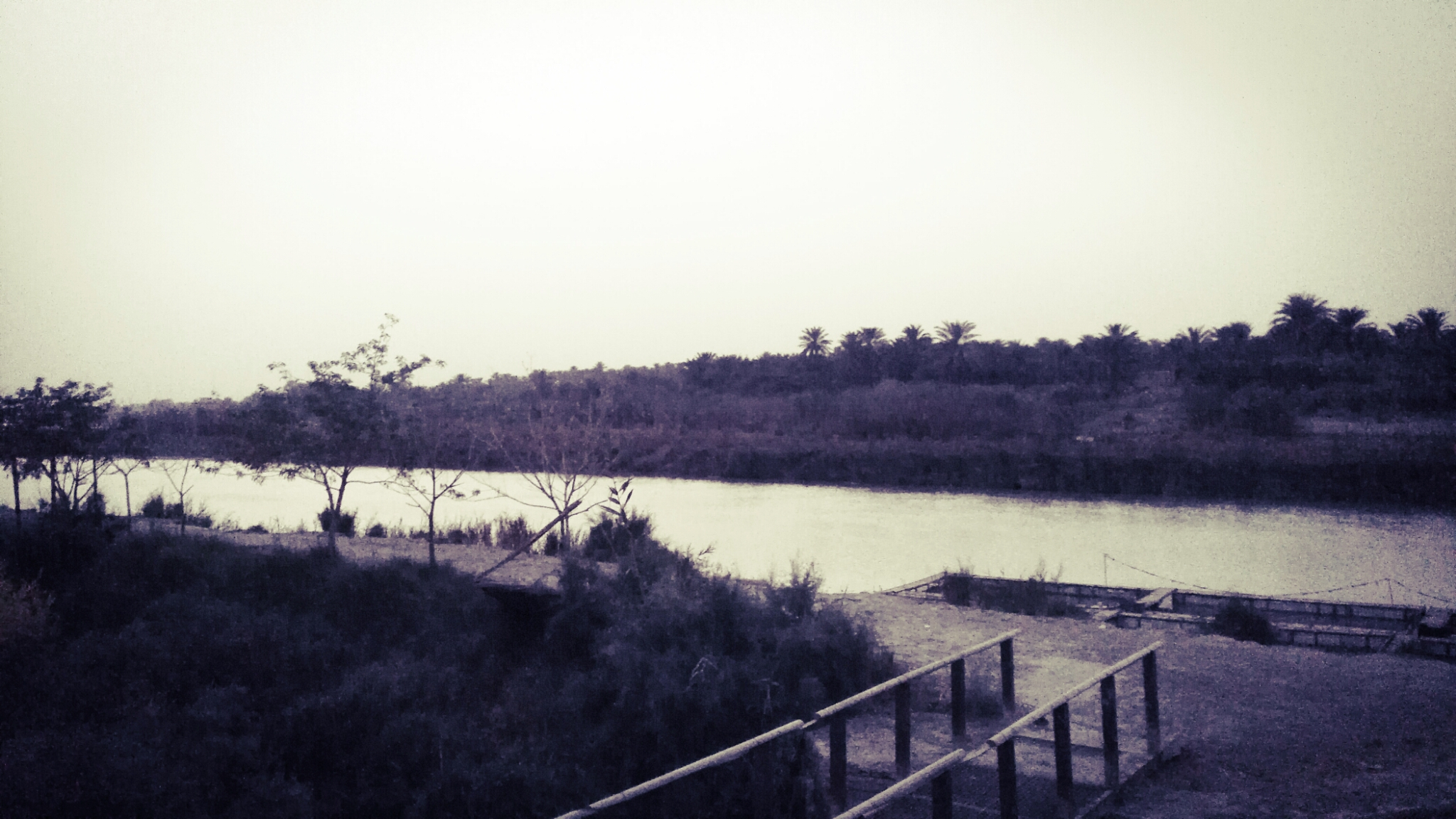

- Location within Iraq
- Coordinates: 31°31′29″N 47°17′31″E
- Country: Iraq
- Governorate: Maysan
- Municipality: Qal'at Saleh District

The town of Qal'at Saleh (Arabic: قلعة صالح) is the district centre of Qal'at Saleh District, Maysan Governorate, southern Iraq. It is located along the road that links Basra to Amarah, a mere 40 km away. Qalat Saleh’s nearest towns are the district centres of Al-Majar Al Kabeer (20 km north-west), Al Kahlaa (17 km north), and Al Azeer (29 km south). The town is surrounded by agricultural villages and rural communities: Sulaymaniyah village, Abu Samih village, and Beit Khaled village.

== History ==
Qal'at Saleh, formerly known as "Shatra Al-Amarah", was named after "Saleh Suleiman Al-Najdi", an Arab officer from Najd, who was appointed by the Ottomans to collect tribute from the rebellious local tribes. In 1866, once the Ottoman troops managed to restrain the rebels, Saleh built a mud fortress (Arabic: قلعة, romanized: Qal'at) to maintain control of the region. The settlement attracted more and more residents and expanded over time around the fortress, which was later destroyed. By the 1920s, Qalat Saleh was a small town developed on both sides of the Karma canal. In the mid-1930s, the canal dried out and became the town’s main commercial axis, Karma Street, along which once could find traders, gold and silver jewelers, carpenters and blacksmiths. At the time, the town comprised five neighborhoods: Al-Amir, Ghadir, Karama, Al Shuhada and Zahra. A few typical timber-latticed shanasheel buildings are still standing – albeit in poor conditions. The great Mosque of Qalat Saleh, built in 1868 during the Ottoman Empire, is one of the town’s most significant heritage landmarks.

Most visitors come to the area to pay a visit to the shrine of Imam Abdullah bin Ali, located 10 km south of the town. Not far from Qalat Saleh is another of Maysan’s famous attractions, the Tomb of Ezra (Prophet Uzayr) and its adjacent old synagogue located in Al Uzair, on the western bank of the Tigris, popularly believed to be the burial place of the biblical figure Ezra, the scribe of the Old Testament. Due to frequent embellishment works, not much of the original Ottoman period shrine has been preserved.

Qal'at Saleh was traditionally a center of learning for the Mandaeans during the 1900s. However, following the 2003 invasion of Iraq, many Mandaeans have since emigrated from Iraq, and there are few Mandaeans left in Qal'at Saleh.

== Demographics ==
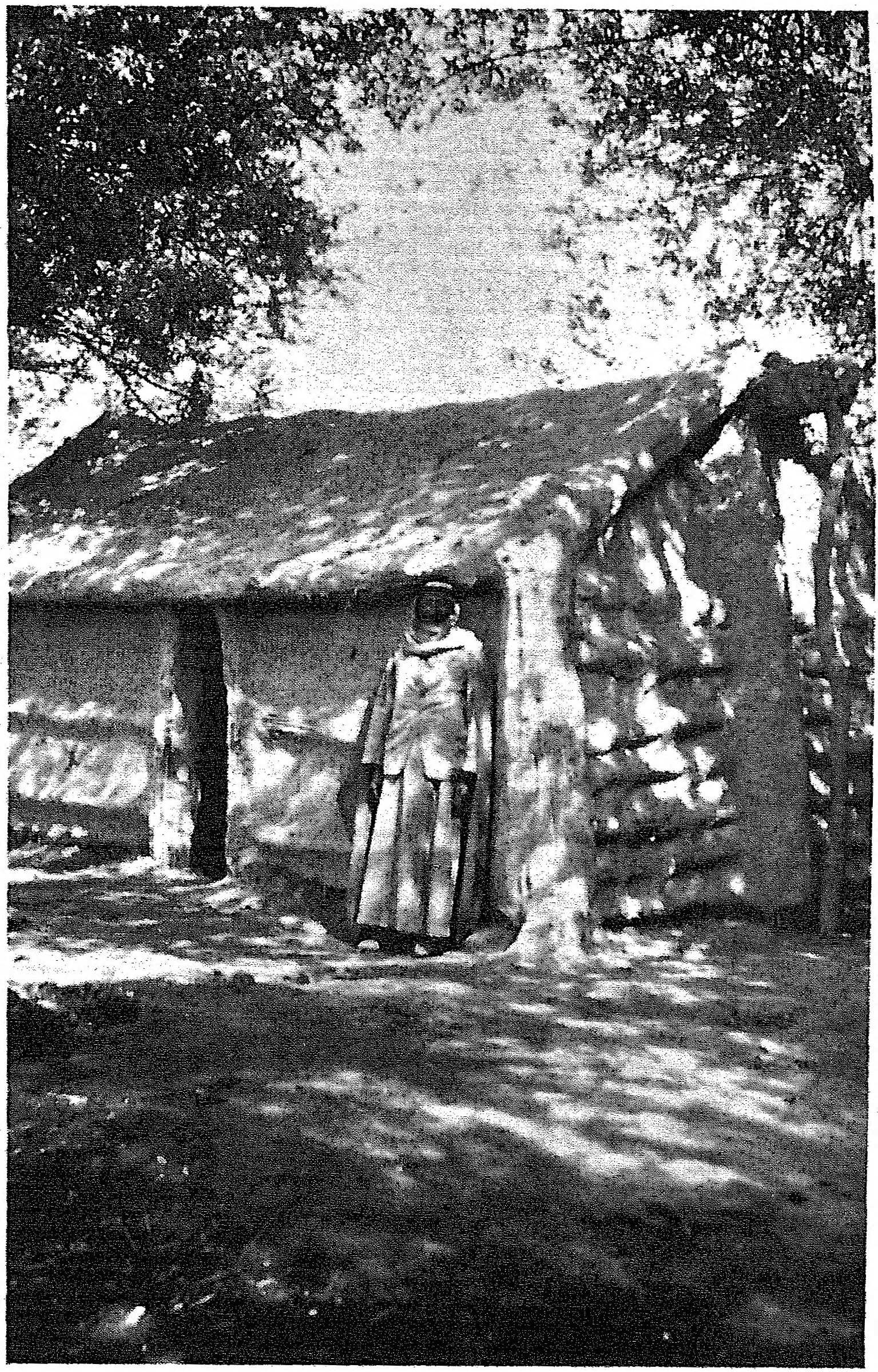
A Mandaean mandi at Qal'at Saleh during the 1930s

The town is mostly Shia, but it has a sizable Mandaean and previously also a Jewish community. As many smaller rural towns in Iraq, dependent on an agrarian economy, Qalat Saleh is experiencing the inexorable population movements towards regional economic magnets. Since the mid-1950s, many families migrated to Amarah, Baghdad and Basra seeking better opportunities. Worsening living conditions and deprivation of the peasants, endemic diseases, neglected irrigation projects and increased salinity of the soil has over time reduced the productivity of agricultural land. Today, poor returns on agricultural activities is pushing farmers – particularly youth – to leave their land to seek work in towns and cities. In 2016, according to estimates of the Directorate of Planning, the town of Qalat Saleh was home to 37,958 inhabitants. Qalat Saleh municipality’s population estimates reach 40,000 inhabitants, with an average household size of 7.7 – which is higher than the national average.

== Industries ==
The Municipality established a dedicated industrial area in the south of the city. By 2017, it was only partially developed.

== Tourism and leisure activities ==
In July 2013, the Iraqi Council of Ministers approved the designation of the Central Marshes of Iraq as the country’s first National Park, as a joint effort by Iraq’s Ministry of Water Resources, Ministry of Environment, and Ministry of Municipalities with support from Nature Iraq, and Iraqi environmental conservation organization. Despite expectations, the planned National Park has not yet been approved by the Council of Ministers. In January 2014, the ‘Ahwar of Southern Iraq and the Relict Landscape of the Mesopotamian Cities’ was successfully nominated for inscription of the property on the World Heritage List. The nomination covers a vast area, spanning between the governorates of Al Muthanna, Dhi Qar and Maysan. It includes the Hawizeh and Central Marshes, that fall under the jurisdiction of Maysan governorate. Since the nomination, the marshes have seen a significant increase of local tourists, researchers and nature enthusiasts. Local inhabitants have benefited from this influx of visitors, offering thrilling excursion on motor boats or the traditional mashoof to visits to the uniquely designed al-mudhif, the traditional ceremonial spaces and reed houses. According to the local authorities, since 2016, the marshes have attracted some 150 visitors and tourists per month, but in peak winter and spring periods they can go up to 150 per week. Yet, gains from the tourism sector have been very limited because of the scarcity in local accommodation, poor accessibility, lack of information and/or organised tours.

== Notable people ==
- Abdul Jabbar Abdullah (1911–1969), an Iraqi wave theory physicist, dynamical meteorologist, and President Emeritus of Baghdad University.
- Abdullah bar Sam (d. 1981), Mandaean priest who is the father of Abdul Jabbar Abdullah

== See also ==
- Tomb of Ezra
