= Sinan Abdullah =

Mandaean-American dentist and community leader

- Born: Sinan Abdul Jabbar Abdullah; March 18, 1947 (age 79); United States
- Other name: Sinan A. J. Abdullah
- Occupation: Dentist
- Spouse: Rand Abdullah (m. 1979)
- Father: Abdul Jabbar Abdullah
- Relatives: Abdullah bar Sam (grandfather); Haithem Abdullah (twin brother)

Sinan Abdul Jabbar Abdullah (born 1947; Arabic: سنان عبد الله) is an Iraqi-American dentist and community leader. He and his twin brother Haithem are known as the first American-born Mandaeans.

== Biography ==
Sinan Abdullah (full name: Sinan Abdul Jabbar Abdullah, Arabic: سنان عبد الجبار عبد الله) was born in 1947. His father Abdul Jabbar Abdullah was a physicist and university administrator who immigrated to the United States from Iraq, while his paternal grandfather was the Mandaean priest Ganzibra Abdullah bar Sam. He and his twin brother Haithem were the first Mandaeans born in the United States. In 1979, Sinan married his wife Rand in Iraq. Their wedding ceremony was officiated by his grandfather, Ganzibra Abdullah bar Sam.

Sinan Abdullah is a dentist who has lived in Niskayuna, New York; Colonie, New York; and other locations. He owns various Mandaean manuscripts that were analyzed by scholars such as Jorunn Jacobsen Buckley and Charles G. Häberl, including a photocopy of a manuscript of the Mandaean Book of John that was copied by Salem Choheili (Mandaean baptismal name: Bayan, son of Sharat) on April 12, 1989.

== See also ==
- Nasser Sobbi
- Lamia Abbas Amara
- List of Mandaic manuscripts
