= Salah Choheili =

Iranian Mandaean priest in Australia

Rishama Salah Choheili
- صلاح چحیلی
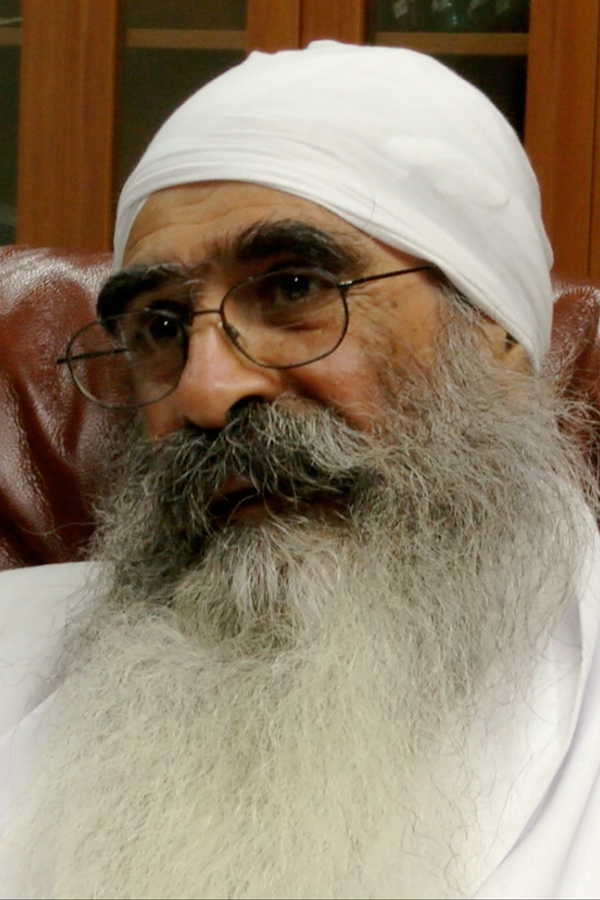
- Salah Choheili in 2016
- Title: Rishama

Personal life
- Born: 1952 (age 73–74) Ahvaz, Imperial State of Iran
- Children: Shadan Choheili
- Parent: Jabbar Choheili (father)
- Citizenship: Iranian, Australian
- Other name: Salah al-Kuhaili
- Occupation: Head of the Mandaean community in Australia
- Relatives: Najah Choheili (brother)

Religious life
- Religion: Mandaeism
- Initiation: Tarmida; 1976; Dora, Baghdad by Abdullah bar Sam

Senior posting
- Initiated: Waleed Khashan

Rishama Salah Choheili (Persian: صلاح چحیلی; also known as Ganzibra Ṣalah Jabbar Ṭawus Choheili; Arabic: صلاح الكحيلي Salah Al-Kuhaili; born 1952, Ahvaz, Iran) is an Iranian Mandaean priest in Australia. He is the head priest of Ganzibra Dakhil Mandi in Liverpool, New South Wales, Australia, as well as Wallacia Mandi in Wallacia, New South Wales.

== Biography ==
Salah Choheili was born in Ahvaz, Iran in 1952 into the Kuhailia (Persian pronunciation: Choheili) family. His malwasha (baptismal name) is Sam bar Sharat Simat (Classical Mandaic: ࡎࡀࡌ ࡁࡓ ࡔࡀࡓࡀࡕ ࡎࡉࡌࡀࡕ, romanized: Sam br Šarat Simat; full baptismal name: Sam br Šarat Simat br Mhatam Yuhana br Yahya br Zihrun, surname Kuhailia). His father was Ganzibra Jabbar Choheili. Salah Choheili's brother is Najah Choheili (Persian: نجاح چحیلی), who is currently the head of the Mandaean community in Iran, while his sister is Nargess Choheili.

In 1976, he was initiated as a tarmida by Ganzibra Abdullah Ganzibra Sam at the Mandi of Dora, Baghdad. He spent 5 months in Baghdad and subsequently returned to Iran to serve the Mandaean community of Khuzestan.

In 1992, he attained the rank of ganzibra. In 1996, he emigrated to Australia. During the early 2000s, his priestly assistants were the tarmidas Haithem Saeed (now a rishama who is more widely known as Brikha Nasoraia) and Alaa An-Nashmi (now more widely known as Yuhana Nashmi).

On June 13, 1999, Ganzibra Salah Choheili, together with Tarmida Taleb Doraji from Ahvaz, performed the first-ever masbuta on a university campus and at an academic conference, the ARAM 13th International Conference at Harvard University. The masbuta was performed in the Charles River, with Salem Choheili and his brother assisting as shgandas. A 52-minute film of the 1999 ARAM conference masbuta was also made by Jesse Buckley, the stepson of Jorunn Jacobsen Buckley.

In 2004, Ganzibra Salah Choheili copied the Mandaean Book of John. His colophon has been translated into English by Gelbert (2017).

Salah Choheili became a rishama in 2010 and is commonly recognized as the head priest and leader of the Mandaean community in Australia. In Australia, he worked on publishing a new version of the Ginza Rabba with various members of the Mandaean community, including Carlos Gelbert, Qais Al-Saadi, and others.

He has initiated several priests, including Ganzibra Waleed Khashan, who also currently resides in Australia.

As the religious head of the Sabian Mandaean Association in Australia, Salah Choheili is currently supervising the construction and expansion of Wallacia Mandi (also known as Mendi Wallacia), a mandi located by the banks of the Nepean River in Wallacia, New South Wales.

Salah Choheili has several children. One of his sons is Shadan Choheili, a Mandaic language teacher.

== See also ==
- Jabbar Choheili
- Mandaean Council of Ahvaz
- Khaldoon Majid Abdullah
- Brikha Nasoraia
