= Jabbar Choheili =

Iranian Mandaean priest (1923–2014)

Rishama Jabbar Choheili
- جبار چحیلی
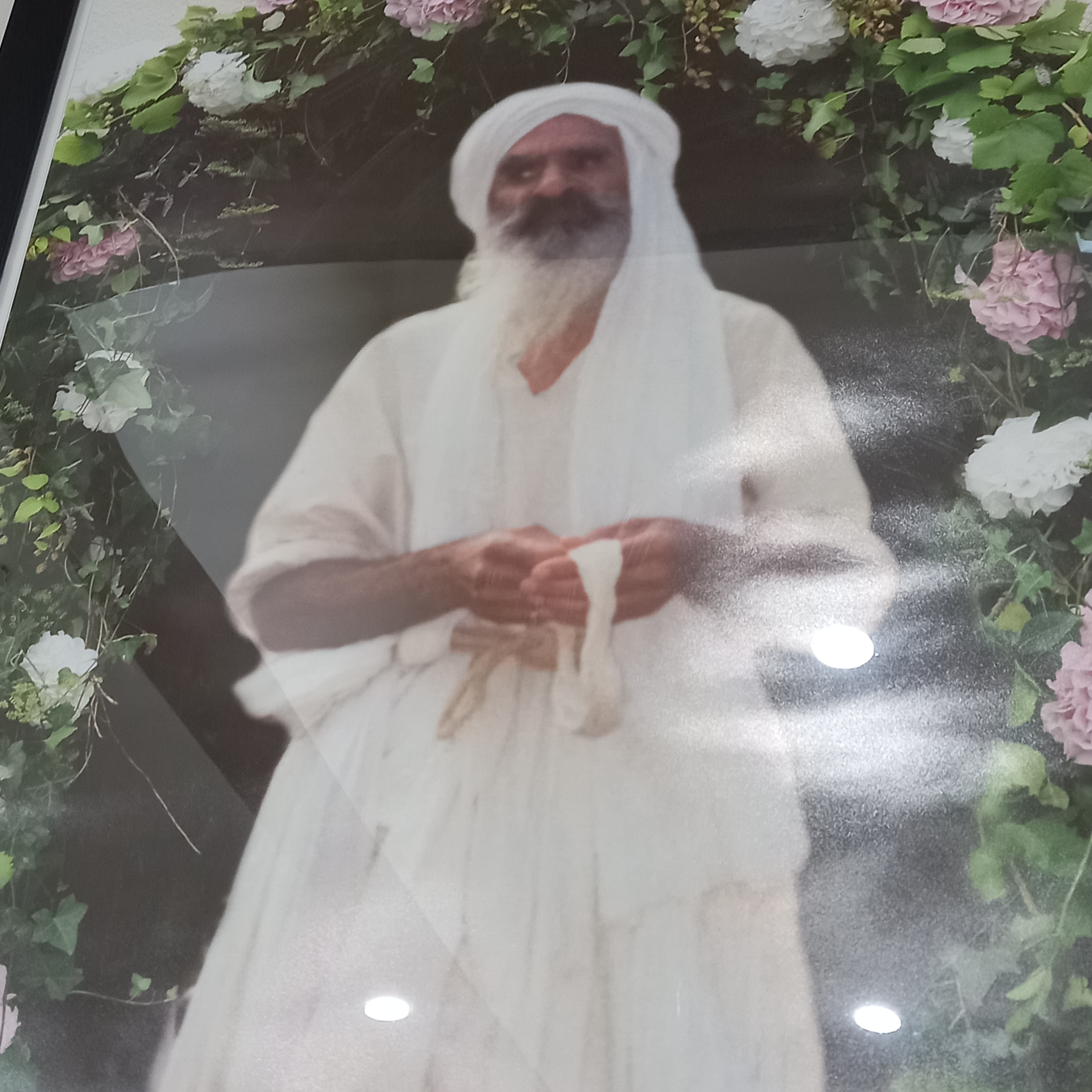
- Portrait of Jabbar Choheili displayed at Ganzibra Dakhil Mandi in Liverpool, New South Wales, Australia, where his son Salah Choheili is currently serving as the head priest
- Title: Ganzibra

Personal life
- Born: 1923 Ahvaz, Sublime State of Persia (present-day Iran)
- Died: December 27, 2014 (aged 91) Ahvaz, Iran
- Children: Salah Choheili; Najah Choheili; Nargess Choheili
- Citizenship: Iranian
- Other names: Mhatam Yuhana bar Sharat, Mhatam Yuhana bar Yahya
- Occupation: Head of the Mandaean Council of Ahvaz in Ahvaz, Iran
- Relatives: Abood Tawoosie (brother); Taleb Doraji (cousin)

Religious life
- Religion: Mandaeism
- Initiation: Tarmida; 1948 by Abdullah bar Sam

Sheikh (Rabbi) Ganzibra Jabbar Choheili (Persian: جبار چحیلی, also known as Sheikh Jabbar Ṭawūsī Al-Kuhaili, Arabic: جبار طاووس الكحيلي; born 1923, died December 27, 2014) was an Iranian Mandaean priest, the head of the Mandaean Council of Ahvaz, which presides over the Mandaean community of Iran.

== Biography ==
Jabbar Choheili held the Mandaean clergical ranks of Ganzibra (head priest) and Rishama (patriarch), the highest Mandaean clergical rank. He was born in 1923 in the city of Ahvaz, Khuzestan Province, Iran into the Kuhailia (Persian pronunciation: Choheili) family. His malwasha (baptismal name) is Mhatam Yuhana (Classical Mandaic: ࡌࡄࡀࡕࡀࡌ ࡉࡅࡄࡀࡍࡀ; full name: Rabbi Ganzibra Mhatam Yuhana bar Sharat; also known as Mhatam Yuhana bar Yahya; or in Arabic: Shaikh Jabar (= Šabur), the son of Ṭawoos) (note: Mandaeans typically have both a birth name and a baptismal name).

Jabbar Choheili's father died in 1924 due to an armory explosion in Ahvaz during the Sheikh Khazal rebellion, a conflict between Reza Shah and Khazʽal Ibn Jabir. Mulla Sa’ad, his grandfather, raised him and his brothers during his childhood. Mulla Sa’ad was also a scribe and in 1930 had copied a version of the Haran Gawaita that was owned by Nasser Sobbi (1924–2018) in New York (Sobbi was the owner of the most extensive private collection of Mandaean manuscripts in the United States).

In 1948, he traveled from Iran to Qal'at Saleh, Iraq to become initiated as a tarmida by Sheikh Abdullah, son of Sh. Sam Sh. Jabbar (a ganzibra who was the father of physicist Abdul Jabbar Abdullah). After he was ordained, Jabbar Choheili returned to Ahvaz, where he completely copied the Ginza Rabba by hand. Carlos Gelbert's Ginza Rabba (2011, 2021) is primarily based on the "Mhatam Yuhana Ginza" (2004).

Ganzibra Jabbar Choheili was the chairman and secretary general of the Mandaean Council of Ahvaz. He was also a goldsmith by profession.

He died on the morning of Sunday, December 27, 2014. He was buried in a Mandaean cemetery in Ahvaz.

== Family ==
Jabbar Choheili's sons are the priests Najah Choheili, currently the head of the Mandaean community in Iran, and Rishama Salah Choheili, who is currently the head of the Mandaean community in Australia. Salah and Najah Choheili have served leadership roles in the Mandaean Council of Ahvaz, also known as the Sabian-Mandaean Association of Iran. Additionally, Nargess Choheili is the daughter of Jabbar Choheili.

Jabbar Choheili's cousin, Taleb Doraji (born 1937 in Ahvaz; also spelled Taleb Dorragi), is a goldsmith who owns a jewellery shop in the Ahvaz bazaar. He became a tarmida in 1998 and later attained the rank of ganzibra. Jabbar Choheili and Taleb Doraji both have the same grandfather, named Salim.

Jabbar Choheili also has a brother, Abood Tawoosie (d. 2013).

== Gallery ==
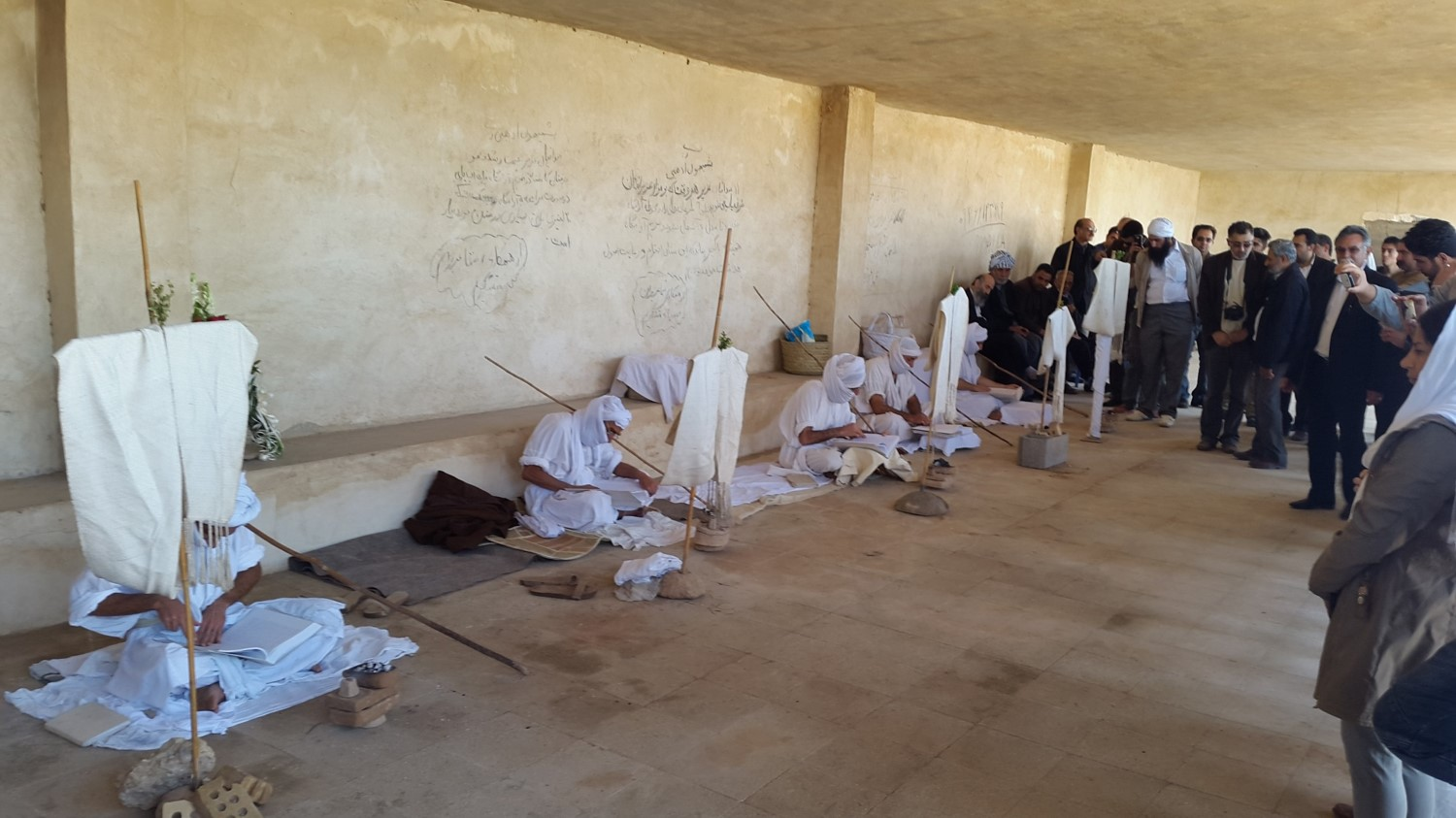
Mandaean priests preparing for the masiqta (funeral ceremony) of Jabbar Choheili in Ahvaz, Iran

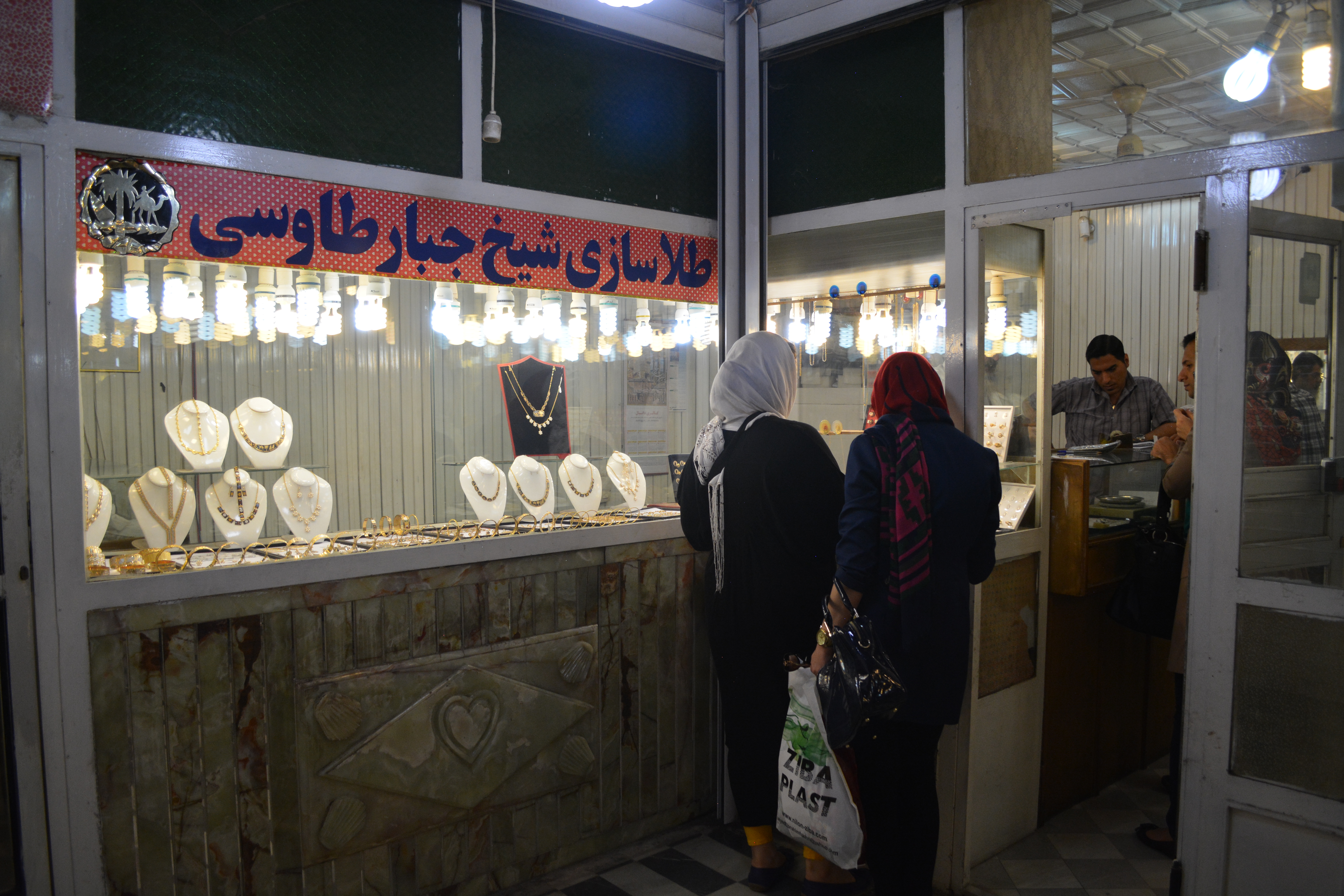
The Sheikh Jabbar Tawusi jewellery shop (طلاسازی شيخ جبار طاوسی), owned by Ganzibra Taleb Doraji in Ahvaz, Iran, is named in honor of his cousin Jabbar Choheili

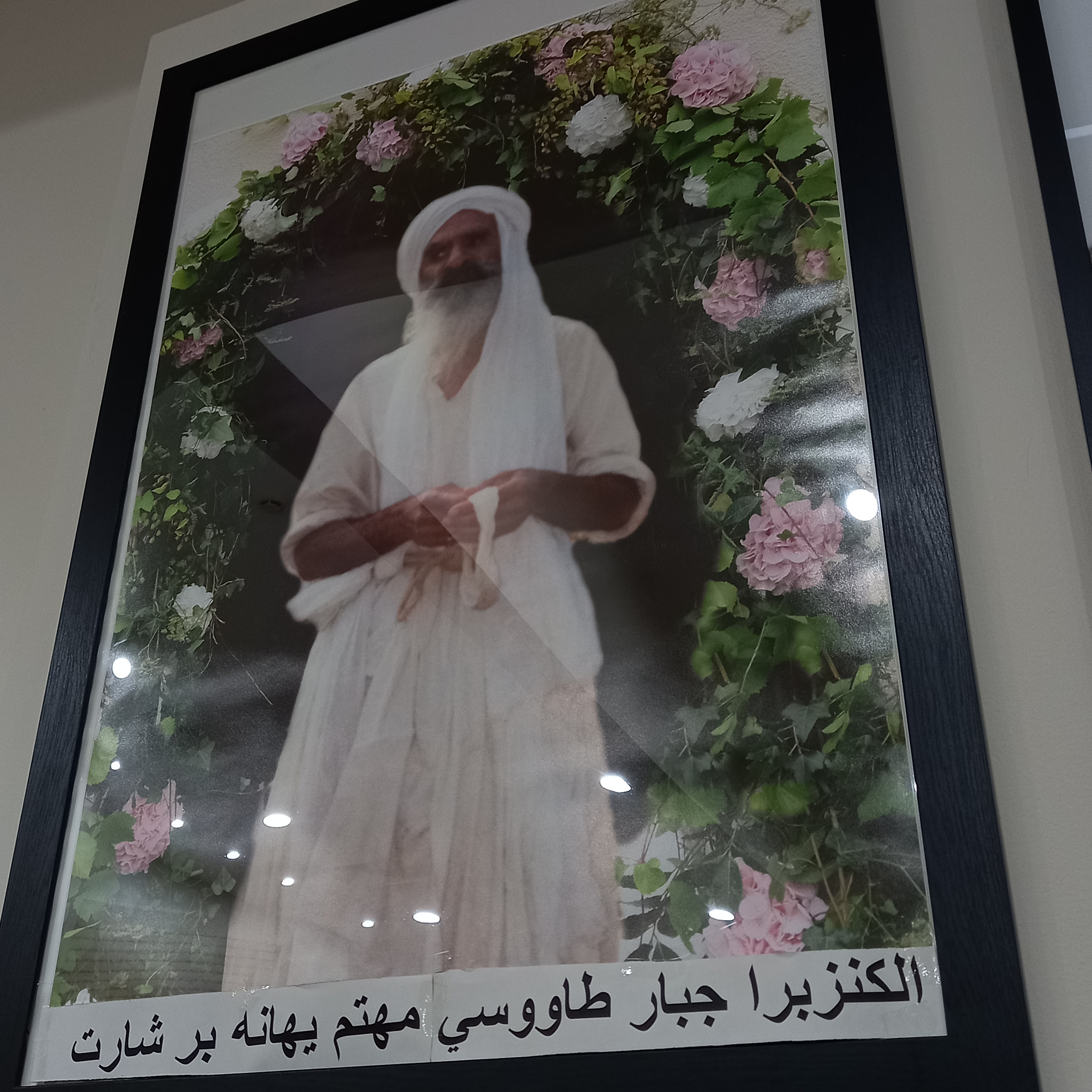
Portrait of Jabbar Choheili displayed at Ganzibra Dakhil Mandi in Liverpool, New South Wales, Australia

== See also ==
- Salah Choheili, the current Mandaean patriarch in Australia and son of Jabbar Choheili
- Najah Choheili, the current Mandaean patriarch in Iran and son of Jabbar Choheili
- Yahya Bihram, a 19th-century Mandaean priest (from Iraq)
- Dakhil Aidan, the Mandaean patriarch from 1917 to 1964 (from Iraq)
- Sattar Jabbar Hilow, the current Mandaean patriarch in Iraq
