= Thomas Buckley =

American anthropologist (1942–2015)

- Born: Thomas Crowell-Taylor Buckley; May 28, 1942; United States
- Died: April 16, 2015 (aged 72); West Bath, Maine, U.S.
- Occupations: Anthropologist and Buddhist priest
- Spouse: Jorunn Jacobsen

Academic background
- Education: University of Chicago (Ph.D., 1982)
- Doctoral advisor: Raymond D. Fogelson

Academic work
- Institutions: University of Massachusetts Boston
- Main interests: Yurok people; Zen Buddhism

Thomas Crowell-Taylor "Tim" Buckley (May 28, 1942 – April 16, 2015) was an American anthropologist and Buddhist monastic best known for his long-term ethnographic research with the Yurok Indians of northern California, his early work in the anthropology of reproduction, including menstruation and culture and for his major reevaluation of the work of Alfred L. Kroeber.

== Biography ==
He received his Ph.D. in anthropology in 1982 from the University of Chicago, where he studied under Raymond D. Fogelson.

His decades-long fieldwork with the Yuroks, beginning in 1976 (following upon Buddhist training in California under Shunryu Suzuki, 1965–71), culminated in his ethnographic monograph Standing Ground, published in 2002. (For this publication he had an honorable mention in the Victor Turner Prize award by the Society for Humanistic Anthropology.)

Harry Roberts (1906–81), a Yurok-trained spiritual teacher from whom Buckley learned, adopted him as his nephew in 1971.

Buckley taught anthropology and American Indian studies at the University of Massachusetts Boston, for many years and at other institutions as a visiting professor. On January 22, 2013, he was ordained as a Soto Zen Buddhist priest, Jōkan Zenshin, by the Rev. Peter Schneider at Beginner's Mind Zen Center in Northridge, California, and established a lay community group, Great River Zendo, in midcoast Maine.

Buckley died in West Bath, Maine on April 16, 2015. He is survived by his wife Jorunn Jacobsen Buckley, Professor of Religion at Bowdoin College.

== Selected works ==
- (1982) "Menstruation and the power of Yurok women: Methods in cultural reconstruction." American Ethnologist 9(1): 47–60.
- (1984) "Yurok speech registers and ontology." Language in Society 13(4): 467–88.
- (1984) "Living in the distance." Parabola 9(3):64-79.
- (1988) (ed., with Alma Gottlieb) Blood Magic: The Anthropology of Menstruation. Berkeley: University of California Press.
- (1996) "The pitiful history of little events": The epistemological and moral contexts of Kroeber's Californian ethnology, 1900–1915. In, Stocking, George W. Jr., ed., History of Anthropology, Vol. 8: Volkengeist as Method and Ethics: Essays on Boasian Ethnography and the German Anthropological Tradition. Madison: University of Wisconsin Press. pp. 257–297.
- (2002) Standing Ground: Yurok Indian Spirituality, 1850-1990. Berkeley: University of California Press.
- (2003) Dancing with Davey, A Sailor's Tale (poems). Newport News, VA: Mariah Books.
