= Mandaean Council of Ahvaz =

Mandaean religious association in Ahvaz, Iran

- Sabian Mandaean Association of Ahvaz
- انجمن صابئین مندایی
- Formation: 1930 or 1931
- Founder: Sheikh Salem Sabouri
- Founded at: Ahvaz
- Location: Ahvaz, Iran
- Region served: Iran
- Rishama: Najah Choheili

The Mandaean Council of Ahvaz (Persian: انجمن صابئین مندایی, literally the Sabian–Mandaean Association of Ahvaz) is the main organization of the Mandaean religion and the primary authority of the Mandaean ethnic community in Ahvaz, Iran.

== History of leadership ==
The Mandaean Council of Ahvaz was founded in 1349 A.H. (Gregorian year: 1930 or 1931) by Sheikh Salem Sabouri (Persian: شیخ سالم صابوری), who was the religious leader of the Mandaeans at that time. It was officially registered in 1359 A.H. (Gregorian year: 1940 or 1941).

Ganzibra Jabbar Choheili (baptismal name: Mhatam Yuhana br Yahya; or in Arabic: Shaikh Jabar, the son of Ṭawoos) was the head priest or ganzibra of the Mandaean Council of Ahvaz during the 1990s and 2000s.

Ganzibra Jabbar Choheili (Persian: جبار چحیلی), chairman of the board of directors of the council, died on the morning of Sunday, December 27, 2014. His son Salah Choheili, who emigrated to Australia in 1996, has also been active on the council.

Rishama Najah Choheili (Persian: نجاح چحیلی) currently serves as the head of the Mandaean Council of Ahvaz.

== Organization ==
The council has a 13-member board of directors. Mandaeans in Ahvaz and nearby towns nominate and vote for candidates to represent them in the board of directors.

The council's responsibilities include teaching Mandaean language, culture, and religion, as well as resolving internal disputes within the Mandaean community.

== Publications ==
In the late 1990s, the Mandaean Council of Ahvaz, under the leadership of Mhatam Yuhana, commissioned and supervised a new Mandaic transcription of the Ginza Rabba, the primary sacred scripture of Mandaeism. It was published as a printed book in 2004. Carlos Gelbert's translation of the Ginza Rabba is primarily based on this version.

The council has also published the Niania prayerbook, translated by Sheikh Salem Choheili (Persian: شیخ سالم چحیلی) with an introduction by Masoud Forouzandeh (or Moussad Frouzandeh; Persian: مسعود فروزنده).

== Gallery ==
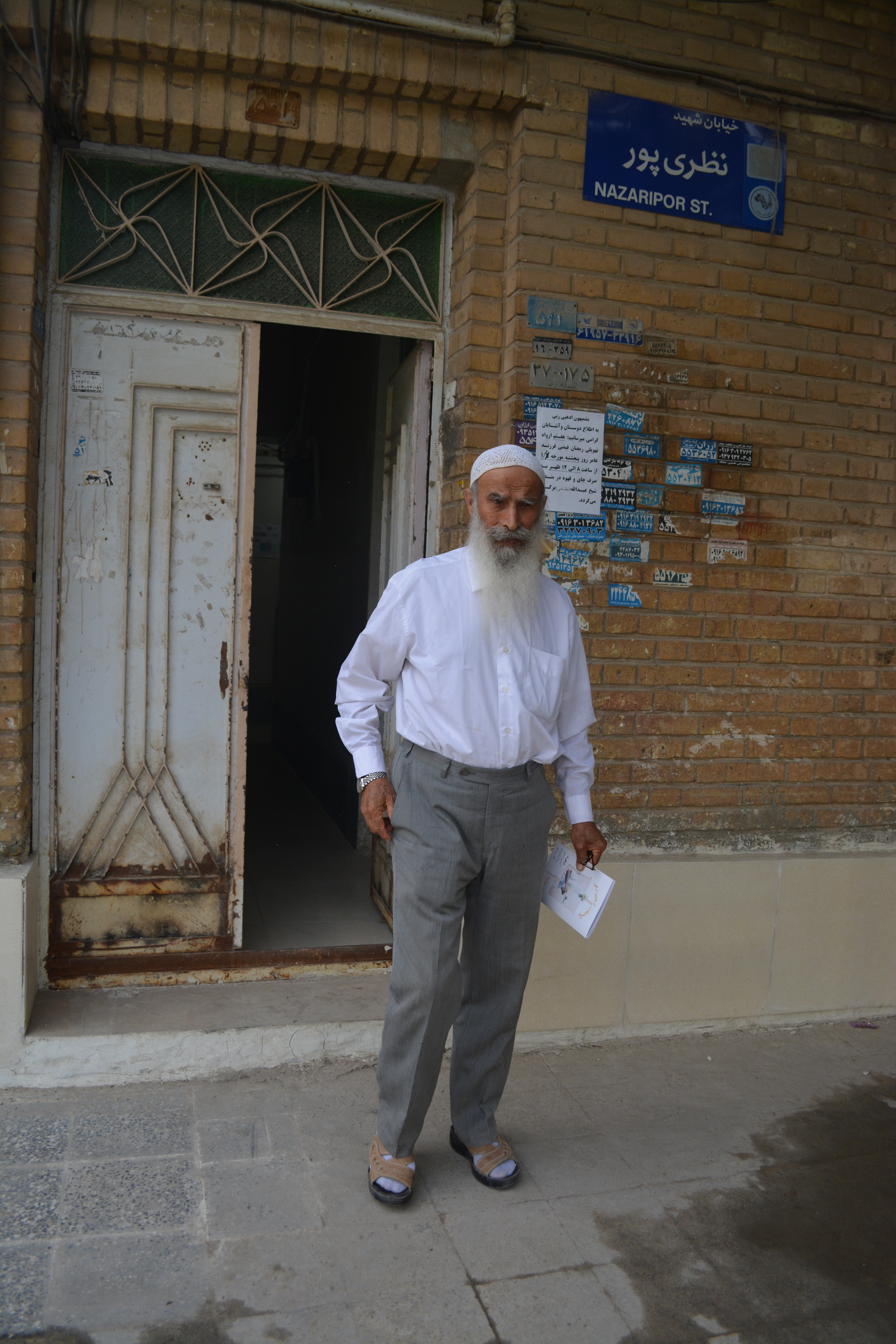
Entrance of the Mandaean center on Nazaripor (نظریپور) Street in Ahvaz, Iran

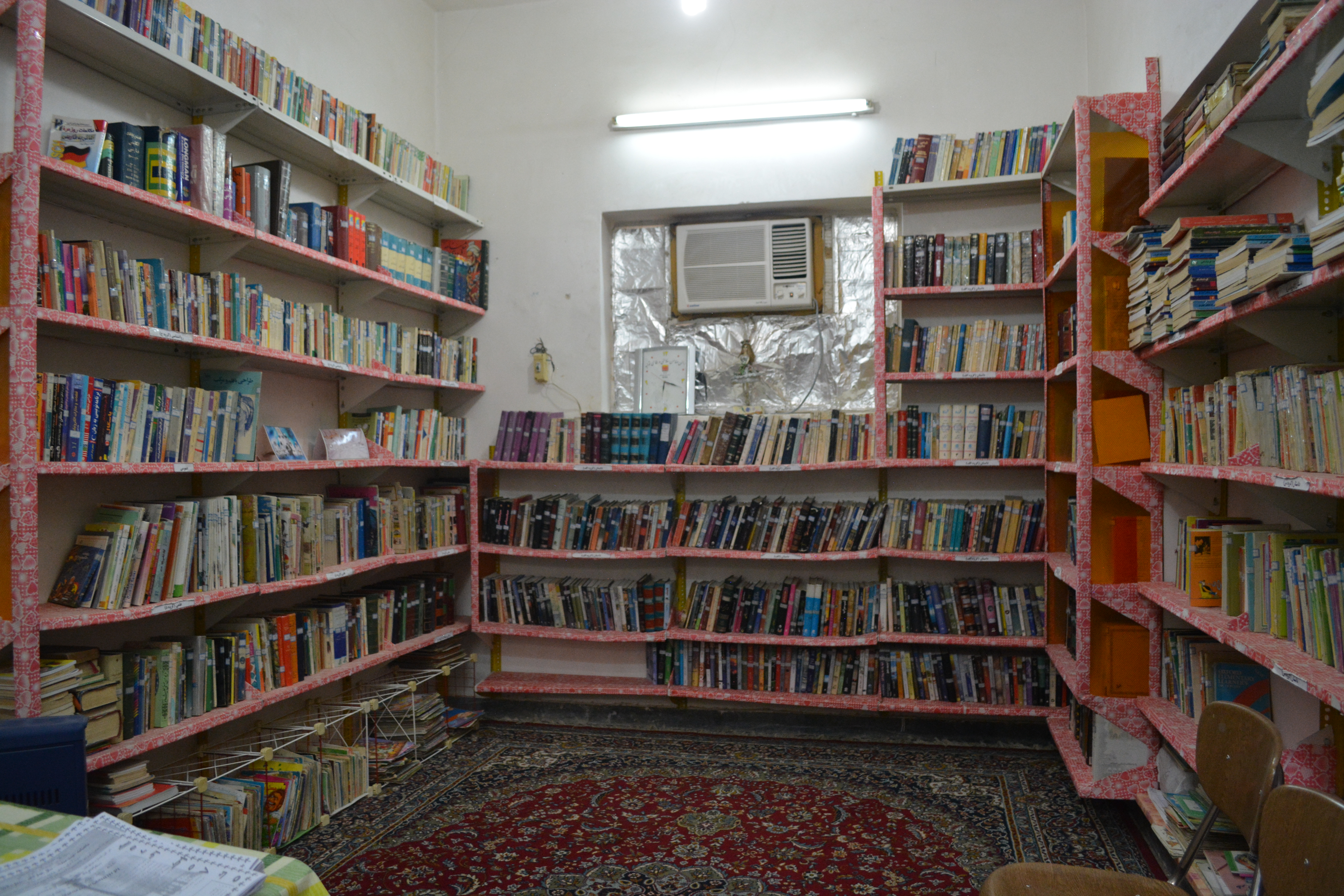
Library at the Mandaean center on Nazaripor (نظریپور) Street in Ahvaz, Iran

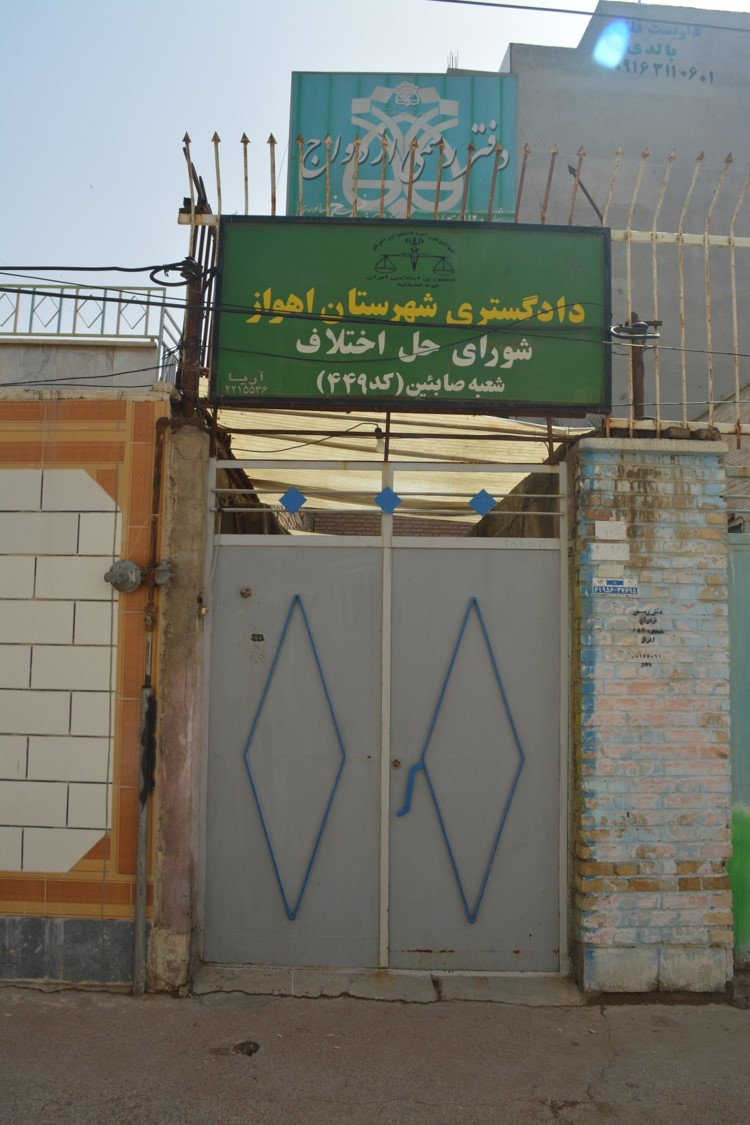
The Mandaean family court (for marital disputes, etc.) in Ahvaz, Iran

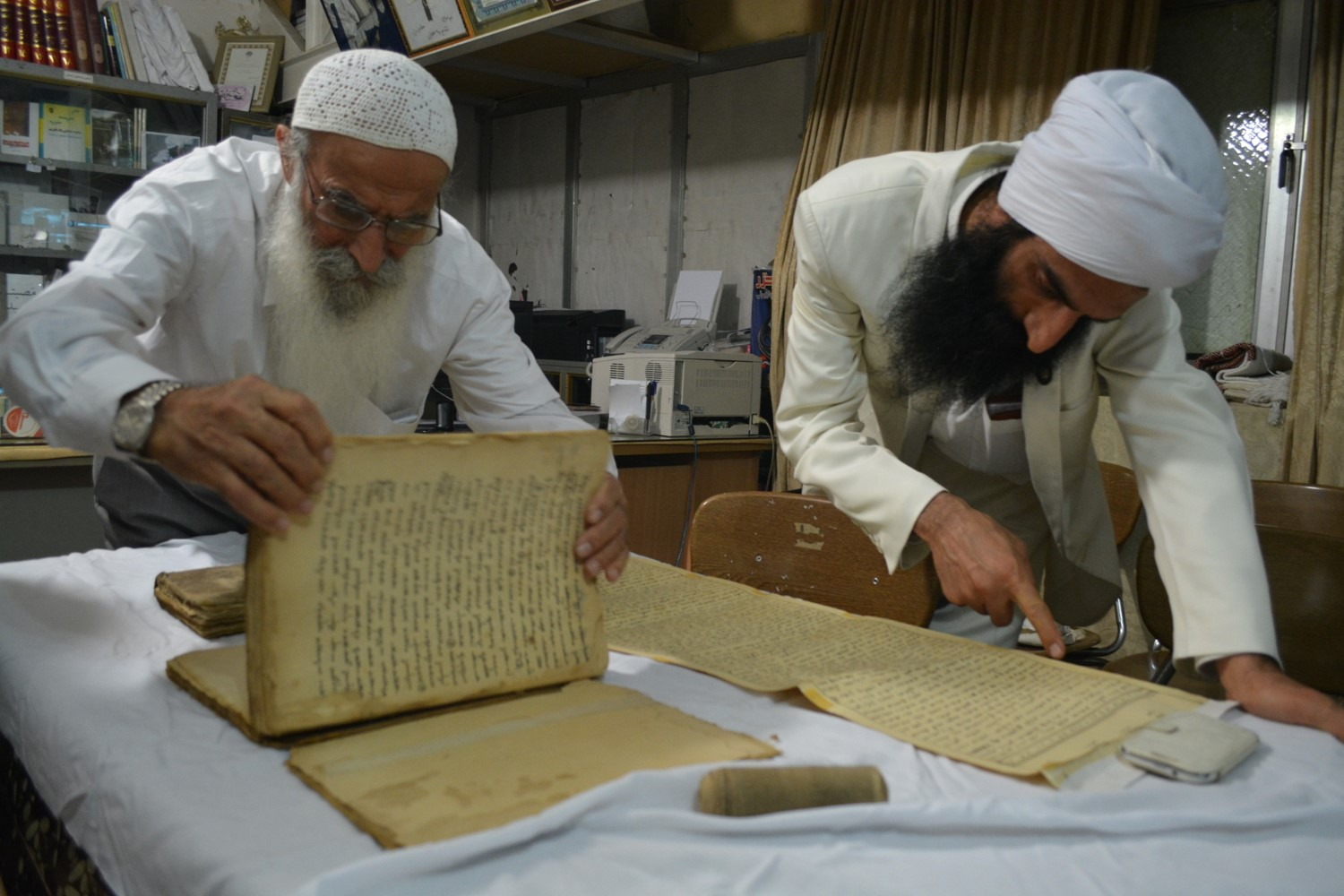
Inspecting Mandaic manuscripts for photographing in Ahvaz, Iran

== See also ==
- Jabbar Choheili
- Najah Choheili
- Salah Choheili
- Salem Choheili
