= Ezra's Tomb =

Holy site in Al-Uzair, Iraq

- العزير; קבר עזרא הסופר
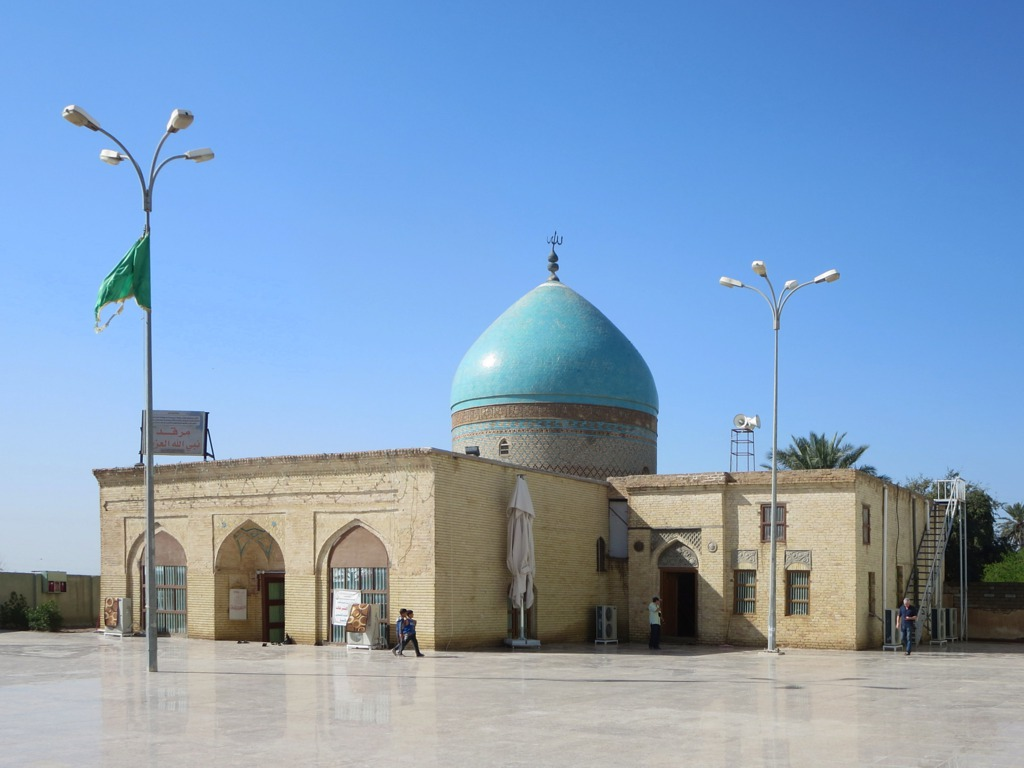
- Ezra's Tomb main building

- Location of the tomb in Iraq

Religion
- Affiliation: Shia Islam; Jewish
- Ecclesiastical or organizational status: Islamic mosque; Jewish shrine
- Status: Active

Location
- Location: Al-Uzair, Qalat Saleh district, Maysan Province
- Country: Iraq
- Interactive map of Ezra's Tomb
- Coordinates: 31°19′30″N 47°24′55″E

Architecture
- Type: Islamic architecture
- Completed: c. 1800 CE

Specifications
- Dome: One
- Shrine: One: Ezra

Ezra's Tomb, also known as the Tomb of Ezra (Arabic: العزير, romanized: Al-ʻUzair, Al-ʻUzayr, Al-Azair; Hebrew: קבר עזרא הסופר), is a Shi'ite Muslim and Jewish shrine, located in al-ʻUzair in the Qal'at Saleh district, in the Maysan Governorate of Iraq, on the western shore of the Tigris river. The shrine is popularly believed to be the burial place of the biblical figure Ezra.

== History ==
The Jewish historian Josephus wrote that Ezra died and was laid to rest in the city of Jerusalem. Hundreds of years later, however, a spurious tomb in his name was claimed to have been discovered in Iraq around the year 1050. (Note: According to a legend circulating among the Jews of Yemen, Ezra died in Iraq as a punishment from God for prohibiting them from ever returning to Jerusalem.)

The tombs of ancient prophets were believed by medieval people to produce a heavenly light; (Note: Tales of this phenomenon circulated as far as China. During the Song Dynasty, Zhou Qufei (周去非, c. 1178) wrote the tomb of Muhammad, known as the Buddha Ma-xia-wu (麻霞勿), had "such a refulgence that no one [could] approach it, those who [did] shut their eyes and [ran] by." Borrowing heavily from Zhou, the later Song scholar Zhao Rugua (c. 1225) said anyone who approached the tomb "[lost] his sight.") it was reputed that on certain nights an "illumination" would go up from the tomb of Ezra. In his Concise Pamphlet Concerning Noble Pilgrimage Sites, Yasin al-Biqai (d. 1684) wrote that the "light descends" onto the tomb. Jewish merchants partaking in mercantile activities in India from the 11th to the 13th century often paid reverence to him by visiting his tomb on their way back to places like Egypt. The noted Jewish traveler Benjamin of Tudela (d. 1173) visited the tomb and recorded the types of observances that both Jews and Muslims of his time afforded it. A fellow Jewish traveler named Yehuda Alharizi (d. 1225) was told a story during his visit (c. 1215) about how a shepherd had learned of its place in a dream 160 years prior. Alharizi, after stating that he initially considered the accounts of lights rising from the tomb "fictitious", claimed that on his visit he saw a light in the sky "clear like the sun [...] illuminating the darkness, skipping to the right and left [...] visibly arising, moving from the west to the east on the face of heaven, as far as the grave of Ezra". He also commented the light that shown on the tomb was the “glory of God.” Rabbi Petachiah of Ratisbon gave a similar account to Alharizi of the tomb's discovery.

Working in the 19th century, Sir Austen Henry Layer suggested the original tomb had probably been swept away by the ever-changing course of the Tigris since none of the key buildings mentioned by Tudela was present at the time of his expedition. If true, this would mean the current tomb in its place is not the same one that Tudela and later writers visited. It continues to be an active holy site today.

== The shrine ==
The present buildings, which unusually comprised a joint Muslim and Jewish shrine, are possibly around 250 years old; there is an enclosing wall and a blue-tiled dome, and a separate synagogue, which though now disused, has been kept in good repair in recent times.

Claudius James Rich noted the tomb in 1820; a local Arab told him that "a Jew, by name Koph Yakoob, erected the present building over it about thirty years ago". Rich stated the shrine had a battlemented wall and a green dome (later accounts describe it as blue), and contained a tiled room in which the tomb was situated.

The shrine and its associated settlement seem to have been used as a regular staging post on journeys upriver during the Mesopotamian Campaign and British Mandate of Mesopotamia, so is mentioned in several travelogues and British military memoirs of the time. (Note: Most mention the striking blue dome, a notable landmark in a region with few buildings. An example is in the memoirs of Sir Ronald Storrs, who states: "That entertaining writer's mausoleum is in my opinion a seventeenth-century structure.") T. E. Lawrence, visiting in 1916, described the buildings as "a domed mosque and courtyard of yellow brick, with some simple but beautiful glazed brick of a dark green colour built into the walls in bands and splashes [...] the most elaborate building between Basra and Ctesiphon". Sir Alfred Rawlinson, who saw the shrine in 1918, observed that a staff of midwives was maintained for the benefit of women who came to give birth there. (Note: Rawlinson rather flippantly characterises the shrine as "a kind of hotel".)

The vast majority of the Iraqi Jewish population emigrated in 1951–52. The shrine has continued in use, however; having long been visited by the Marsh Arabs, it is now a place of pilgrimage for the Shi'a Muslims of southern Iraq. The Hebrew inscriptions of the wooden casket, the dedication plaque, and large Hebrew letters of God's name are still prominently maintained in the worshiping room. Until 2003, remaining number of Jews visited the site and were allowed to pray.

=== Architecture ===
The mosque has a blue-tiled dome over the darih (mausoleum) of Ezra. The Darih has no windows but an entrance. Inside the darih there is a wooden cenotaph with inscriptions on it. The architecture of the mosque is very similar to other Shi'i shrines in Iraq.

== Gallery ==
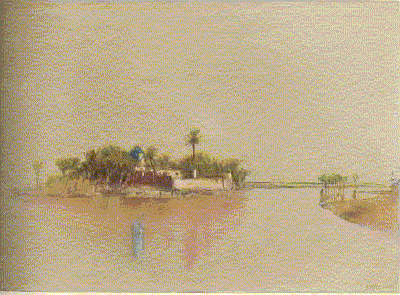
Ezra's Tomb by British war artist Donald Maxwell, c. 1918

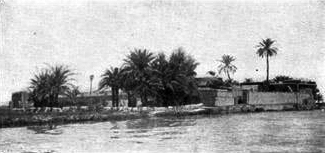
Photograph of Ezra's Tomb, early 20th century. The dome is hidden by date palms.

The darih under the dome

== See also ==
- Shia Islam in Iraq
- History of the Jews in Iraq
- List of mosques in Iraq
- Islamic view of Ezra
- Tedef, the location of another tomb attributed to Ezra in Syria
