= Qal'at Saleh District =

Qal'at Saleh District قضاء قلعة صالح
- District
- Interactive map of Qal'at Saleh District
- Coordinates: 31°37′53.223″N 47°16′47.136″E
- Country: Iraq
- Governorate: Maysan Governorate
- Seat: Qal'at Saleh
- Time zone: UTC+3 (AST)

Qal'at Saleh District (Arabic: قضاء قلعة صالح, romanized: Qalˤat Ṣāleḥ) is a district of the Maysan Governorate, Iraq.

Its district centre is Qal'at Saleh, a town of an estimated 40,000 inhabitants, located on the riverbanks of the Tigris, along the road that links Basra to Amarah, a mere 40 km away. Qalat Saleh's nearest towns are the district centres of Al-Majar Al Kabeer (20 km north-west), Al Kahlaa (17 km north), and Al Azeer (29 km south).

== Mandaean community ==
The town of Liṭlaṭa in Qal'at Saleh District was the site of a Mandaean bit manda (temple) that the British scholar E. S. Drower often visited. Sheikh Negm bar Zahroon, a 20th-century Mandaean priest, lived in Liṭlaṭa for most of his life.

Notable Mandaeans who were born in Qal'at Saleh include the Mandaean priest Abdullah bar Sam and his son Abdul Jabbar Abdullah.
