= Abdullah bar Sam =

20th-century Iraqi Mandaean priest

Sheikh Abdullah bar Sam
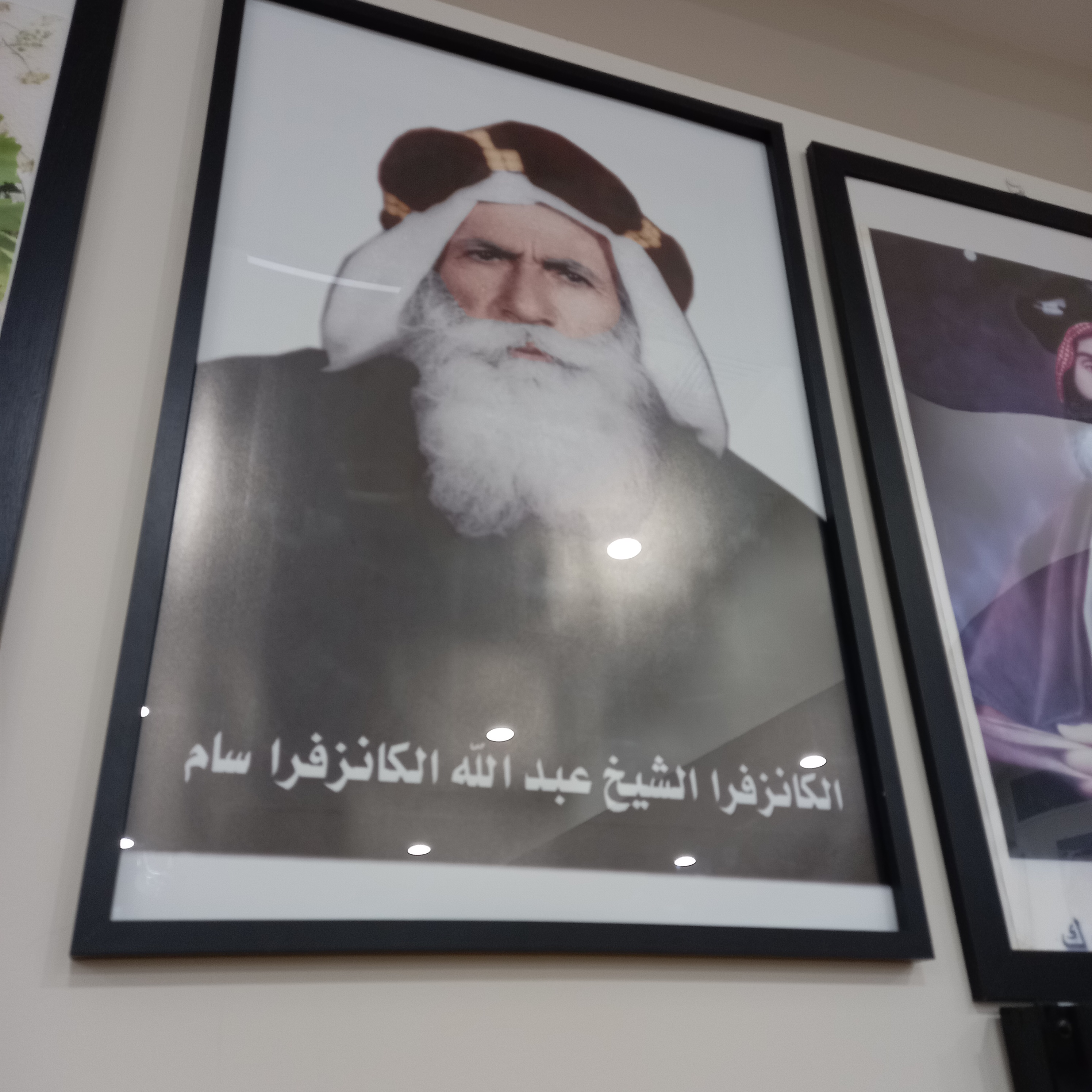
- Portrait of Ganzibra Sheikh Abdullah bar Sam at Ganzibra Dakhil Mandi
- Title: Ganzibra

Personal life
- Born: c. 1890? Qal'at Saleh, Ottoman Iraq
- Died: 1981 Baghdad, Iraq
- Children: Abdul Jabbar Abdullah
- Parent: Sam, son of Jabbar (father)
- Citizenship: Iraqi
- Other name: Adam Zihrun bar Sam
- Occupation: Mandaean priest
- Relatives: Sinan Abdullah (grandson)

Religious life
- Religion: Mandaeism

Senior posting
- Predecessor: Dakhil Aidan
- Successor: Abdullah bar Negm
- Initiated: Jabbar Choheili (1948), Salah Choheili (1976)

Sheikh (Rabbi) Abdullah bar Sam (Arabic: عبدالله ابن سام; born in Qal'at Saleh, Iraq; died 1981, Baghdad, Iraq) was an Iraqi Mandaean priest. He is known as the priestly initiator of Jabbar Choheili and Salah Choheili, as well as the father of physicist Abdul Jabbar Abdullah.

== Life ==
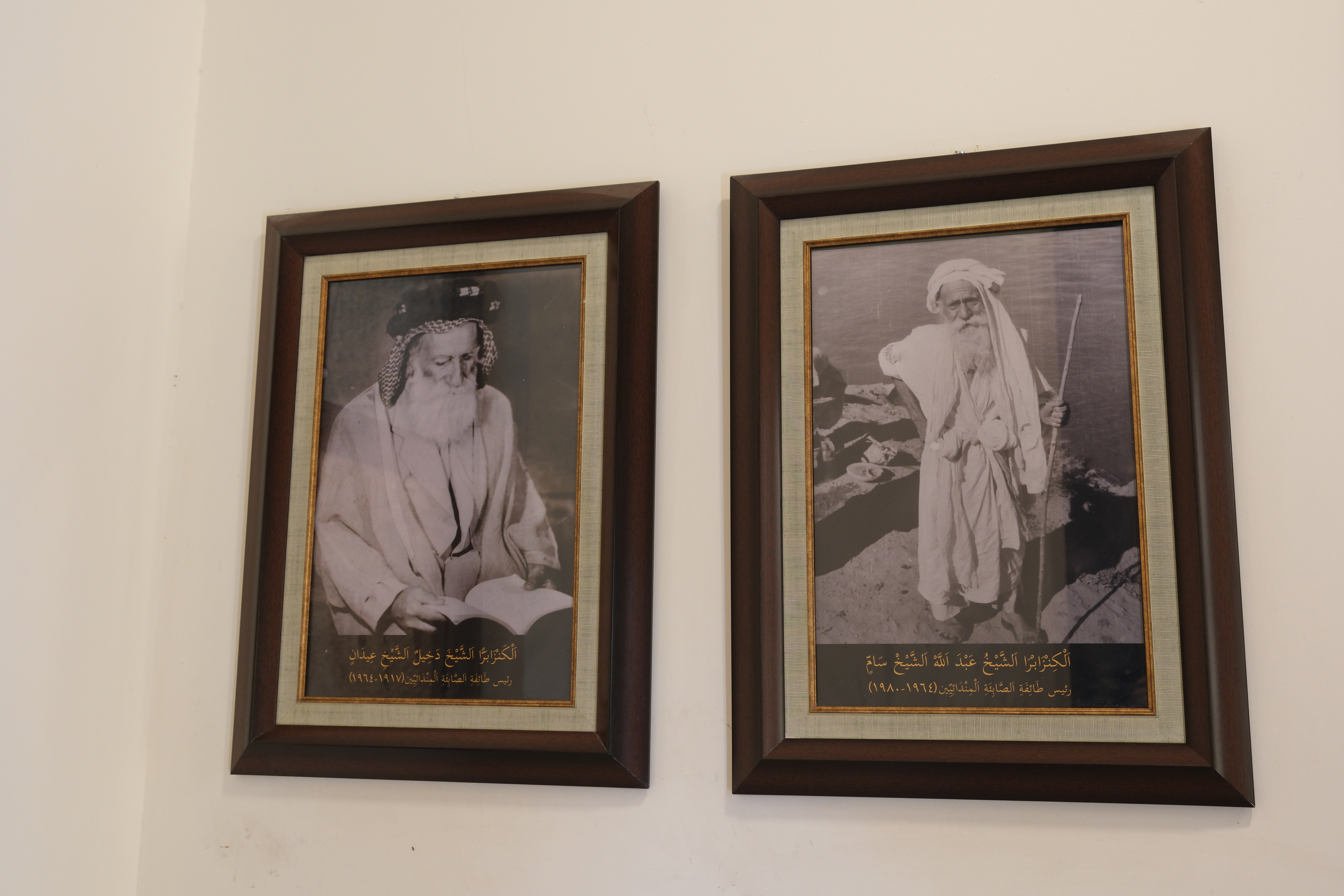
A portrait of Ganzibra Abdullah bar Sam (right) next to a portrait of Sheikh Dakhil Aidan (left) at the Sabian–Mandaean Mandi of Baghdad

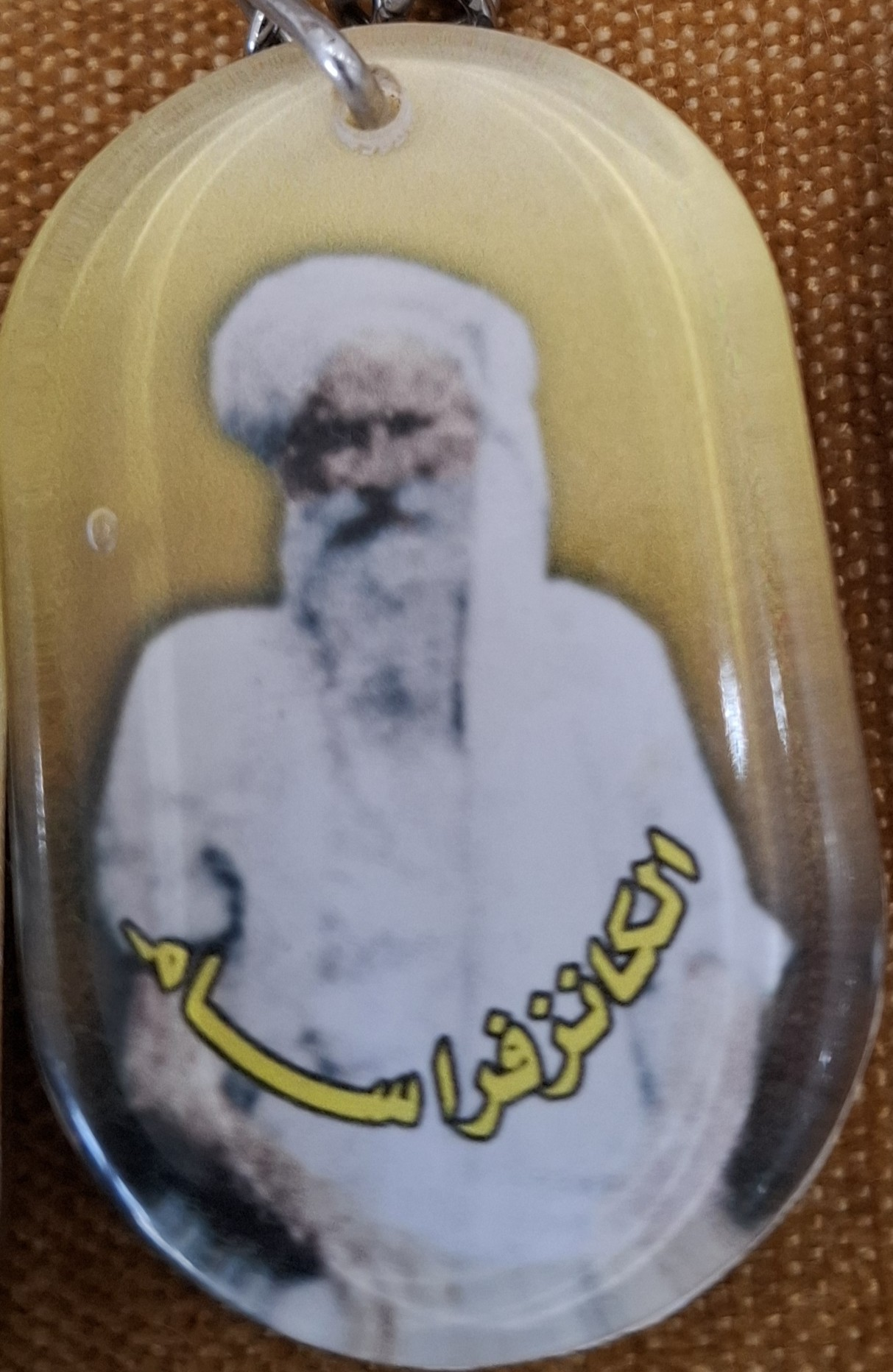
A keychain with a portrait of Ganzibra Sam, the father of Ganzibra Abdullah

Abdullah bar Sam was born into the Manduia and ‛Kuma families in Qal'at Saleh, Iraq, probably sometime just before the turn of the 20th century. His father's name was the Ganzibra Sam, son of Sheikh Jabbar. Abdullah bar Sam's Mandaean baptismal name was Adam Zihrun bar Sam (Classical Mandaic: ࡀࡃࡀࡌ ࡆࡉࡄࡓࡅࡍ ࡁࡓ ࡎࡀࡌ, romanized: Adam Zihrun br Sam).

Ganzibra Abdullah copied the Ginza Rabba by hand in 1928; as of 2010, that copy of the Ginza Rabba belonged to the Elmanahi family in New York state, United States.

In 1948, he initiated Jabbar Choheili from Ahvaz, Iran into the priesthood. In 1976, he initiated Jabbar Choheili's son Salah Choheili as a tarmida at the Mandi of Dora, Baghdad.

== Family ==
His son Abdul Jabbar Abdullah (1911–1969) was a well-known physicist and meteorologist, while his grandson is Sinan Abdullah.

== See also ==
- List of Mandaean priests

Preceded by Dakhil Aidan	Rishama (Iraq); 1964–1981	Succeeded by Abdullah bar Negm
