= Taleb Doraji =

Iranian Mandaean priest (born 1937)

Ganzibra Taleb Doraji
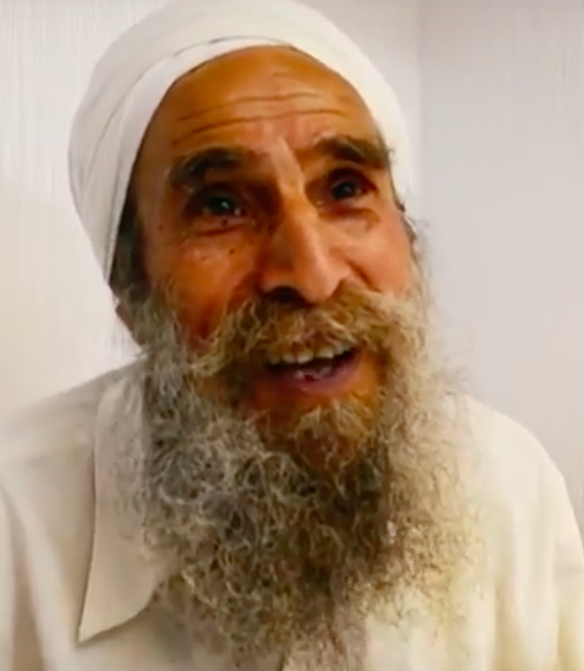
- Taleb Doraji in 2015
- Title: Ganzibra

Personal life
- Born: 1937 (age 88–89) Ahvaz, Iran
- Citizenship: Iranian
- Occupation: Mandaean priest and goldsmith
- Relatives: Jabbar Choheili (cousin)

Religious life
- Religion: Mandaeism

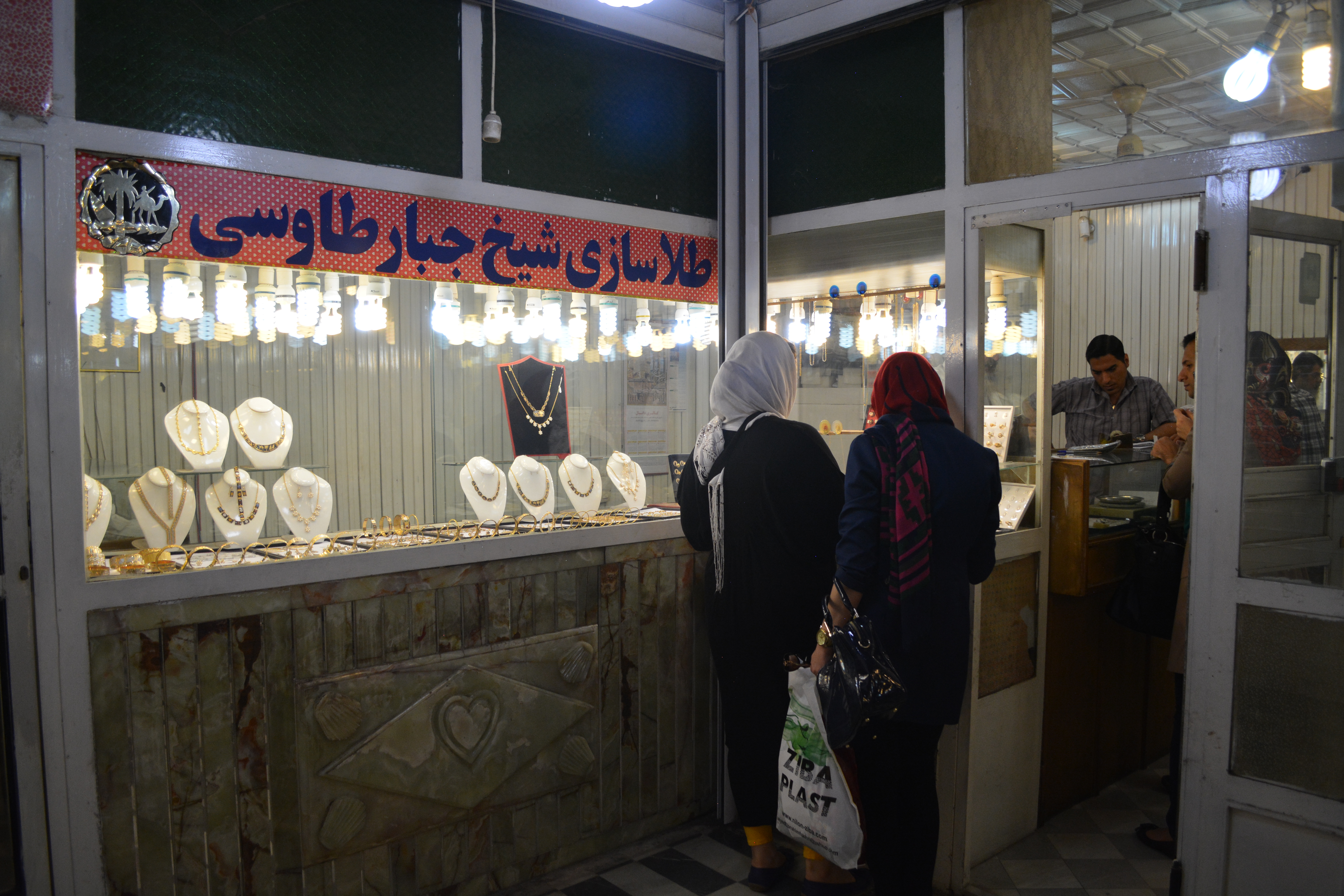
The Sheikh Jabbar Tawusi jewellery shop (طلاسازی شيخ جبار طاوسی), owned by Ganzibra Taleb Doraji in Ahvaz, Iran, is named in honor of his cousin Jabbar Choheili.

Ganzibra Taleb Doraji (also spelled Taleb Doragi, Taleb Dorragi, or Talib Durašia (Classical Mandaic: ࡕࡀࡋࡉࡁ ࡃࡅࡓࡀࡔࡉࡀ); born 1937 in Ahvaz, Iran) is an Iranian Mandaean priest and goldsmith from Ahvaz, Khuzestan.

He became a tarmida in 1998 and later attained the rank of ganzibra.

== Biography ==
Taleb Doraji was born in Ahvaz in 1937. He is the cousin of Jabbar Choheili, since they both have the same grandfather, named Salim. Taleb Doraji is a member of the Durašia (also spelled Durakia in the colophons of Mandaean texts; modern Persianized pronunciation: "Doraji") clan.

On June 13, 1999, Taleb Doraji (who had just become a tarmida a year earlier), together with Ganzibra Salah Choheili from Ahvaz, performed the first-ever masbuta on a university campus and at an academic conference, the ARAM 13th International Conference at Harvard University. The masbuta was performed in the Charles River, with Salem Choheili and his brother assisting as shgandas.

Taleb Doraji is a goldsmith who owns a jewellery shop in the Ahvaz bazaar. His shop is called the Sheikh Jabbar Tawusi jewellery shop (Persian: طلاسازی شيخ جبار طاوسی), which is named in honor of his cousin Ganzibra Jabbar Choheili.
