= Jorunn Jacobsen Buckley =

Norwegian-American religious studies scholar (born 1944)

- Born: Jorunn Jacobsen; 1944 (age 81–82); Norway
- Citizenship: American; Norwegian
- Occupation: Professor
- Spouse: Thomas Buckley
- Children: Jesse Buckley

Academic background
- Education: University of Uppsala (undergraduate studies); Cand. philol., University of Bergen; Cand. mag., University of Oslo
- Alma mater: University of Chicago Divinity School (Ph.D., 1978)
- Thesis: Spirit Ruha in Mandaean Religion (1978)

Academic work
- Institutions: Bowdoin College
- Main interests: Mandaeism; History of religion

Jorunn Jacobsen Buckley (born Jorunn Jacobsen, 1944) is a Norwegian-American religious studies scholar and historian of religion known for her work on Mandaeism and Gnosticism. She was a former Professor of Religion at Bowdoin College. She is known for translating the Scroll of Exalted Kingship and other Mandaean texts, as well as for her various books on the Mandaean religion and people. Her interests include Mandaean genealogy and anthropology.

== Education ==
Jorunn Jacobsen was born in Norway. She began her undergraduate studies during the 1960s. As an undergraduate student, she studied psychology, philosophy, and Ancient Greek, and eventually became interested in Gnosticism and Mandaeism. In 1971, she went to the University of Uppsala and then studied briefly at the University of Utrecht. She also visited Iran in 1973 to conduct fieldwork on the Mandaeans. In 1975, she began her doctoral studies at the University of Chicago Divinity School and received a Ph.D. in 1978. Her doctoral thesis was titled Spirit Ruha in Mandaean Religion.

== Career ==
Jorunn Buckley has conducted fieldwork twice in Iran, in 1973 and 1996, as well as among Mandaean diaspora communities around the world. She has regularly collaborated with Mandaic scholars such as Kurt Rudolph and Rudolf Macúch.

For most of her career, Buckley was a professor at Bowdoin College, a private liberal arts college in Brunswick, Maine.

Buckley is also known for her work as a legal witness in Mandaean immigration asylum claims. In 1995, the Executive Office for Immigration Review of the U.S. Department of Justice certified Buckley as an expert witness on the Mandaeans.

== Affiliations ==
Buckley is a member of:

- American Academy of Religion
- Society of Biblical Literature

== Conferences ==
Buckley has presented at all of the ARAM International Conferences specifically dedicated to Mandaean studies:

- ARAM 13th International Conference (13-15 June 1999), Harvard University (with masbutas performed in the Charles River by Salah Choheili and Taleb Doragi, with Salem Choheili and his brother assisting as shgandas). A 52-minute film of the 1999 ARAM conference masbuta, which was compiled from 9 hours of raw footage, was made by Buckley's stepson Jesse Buckley.
- ARAM 17th International Conference (7 July 2002), The Oriental Institute, University of Oxford (with masbutas performed in the River Thames)
- ARAM 24th International Conference (8-10 July 2007), Sancta Sophia College, University of Sydney (with masbutas performed in the Nepean River at Penrith)
- ARAM 27th International Conference (9-11 July 2009), The Oriental Institute, University of Oxford
- ARAM 36th International Conference (8-9 July 2013), The Oriental Institute, University of Oxford

== Personal life ==
Jorunn Buckley was married to Thomas Buckley, an American anthropologist who died in 2015. She is currently retired and lives in Maine.

Her stepson, Jesse Buckley, is a video editor.

== Selected publications ==
=== Books ===
A selection of books authored by Buckley:

- Female Fault and Fulfilment in Gnosticism. Chapel Hill: University of North Carolina Press, 1986.
- The Mandaeans: Ancient Texts and Modern People. New York: Oxford University Press, 2002.
- The Great Stem of Souls: Reconstructing Mandaean History. Piscataway, NJ: Gorgias Press, 2005.
- Drower's Folk-Tales of Iraq. Piscataway, NJ: Gorgias Press, 2007.
- Lady E. S. Drower's Scholarly Correspondence: An Intrepid English Autodidact in Iraq. Leiden: Brill, 2012.
- 1800 Years of Encounters with Mandaeans. Piscataway, NJ: Gorgias Press, 2023.

=== Articles ===
Selected journal articles authored by Buckley:

- "The Mandaean Šitil as an Example of ‘the Image Above and Below.’" Numen 26, no. 2 (1979): 185–91.
- "Two Female Gnostic Revealers." History of Religions 19, no. 3 (1980): 259–69.
- "The Mandaean Tabahata Masiqta." Numen 28, no. 2 (1981): 138–63.
- "Mani’s Opposition to the Elchasaites: A Question of Ritual." In Traditions in Contact and Change: Selected Proceedings of the XIVth Congress of the International Association for the History of Religions, edited by P. Slater and D. Wiebe, 323–36. Waterloo, Ontario: Wilfrid Laurier University Press, 1983.
- "A Rehabilitation of Spirit Ruha in Mandaean Religion." History of Religions 22, no. 1 (1982): 60–84.
- "Tools and Tasks: Elchasaite and Manichaean Purification Rituals," Journal of Religion 66, no. 4 (1986): 399–411.
- "Mandaean Religion." In The Encyclopedia of Religion, vol. 9, edited by M. Eliade, 150–53. New York: Macmillan, 1987.
- "Conceptual Models and Polemical Issues in the Gospel of Philip." In Aufstieg und Niedergang der römischen Welt, pt. 2, 25, 5, edited by H. Temporini and W. Haase, 4167–94. Berlin: de Gruyter, 1988.
- "A Study of the Two Liturgical Collections in J. de Morgan’s Textes Mandaïtes." Le Muséon 104, vols. 1–2 (1991): 191–203.
- "The Colophons in The Canonical Prayerbook of the Mandaeans." Journal of Near Eastern Studies 51, no. 1 (1992): 33–50.
- "The Mandaean Appropriation of Jesus’ Mother, Miriai." Novum Testamentum 35, no. 2 (1993): 181–96.
- "Libertines or Not: Fruit, Bread, Semen and Other Body Fluids in Gnosticism," Journal of Early Christian Studies 2, no. 1 (1994): 15–31.
- "A Mandaean Correspondence." In Gnosisforschung und Religionsgeschichte: Festschrift für Kurt Rudolph zum 65. Geburtstag, edited by Holger Preissler and Hubert Seiwert, 55–60. Marburg: diagonal-Verlag, 1994.
- "The Colophons in H. Petermann’s Sidra Rabba." Journal of the Royal Asiatic Society, 3d ser., 5, no. 1 (1995): 21–38.
- "With the Mandaeans in Iran." Religious Studies News 11, no. 3 (1996): 8.
- "Professional Fatigue: ‘Hibil’s Lament’ in the Mandaean Book of John." Le Muséon 110, fasc. 3–4 (1997): 367–81.
- "Glimpses of a Life: Yahia Bihram, Mandaean Priest." History of Religions 39, no. 1 (1999), 32–49.
- "The Evidence for Women Priests in Mandaeism." Journal of Near Eastern Studies 59, no. 2 (2000): 93–106.
- "A Re-Investigation of The Book of John." ARAM 16 (2004): 13–23.
- Review of The Mandaeans: The Last Gnostics, by Edmondo Lupieri. Journal of the American Academy of Religion 71 (2002): 220–23.
- "Hibil's Lament from The Book of John," in The Gnostic Bible, edited by Willis Barnstone and Marvin Meyer, 555–60. Boston: Shambhala, 2003.
- "A Mandaean Appropriation of Jesus' Mother Miriai." In A Feminist Companion to Mariology, edited by Amy-Jill Levine, 182–93. London: T & T Clark, 2005.
- "Mandaean Community in Iran." In Encyclopaedia Iranica, edited by Ehsan Yarshater. New York: Columbia University, MEALAC–Center for Iranian Studies, 2005.
- "Turning the Tables on Jesus: The Mandaean View." In A People's History of Christianity, edited by Richard Horsley, vol. 1: Christian Origins, 94–109. Philadelphia: Fortress, 2005.
- Buckley, Jorunn J. (2016). "Mandaic Literature". The Oxford Handbook of the Literatures of the Roman Empire. Oxford University Press. doi:10.1093/oxfordhb/9780199699445.013.9. ISBN 978-0-19-969944-5.

== See also ==
- Charles G. Häberl
- James F. McGrath
- E. S. Drower
