= Shganda =

Ritual assistant in Mandaeism

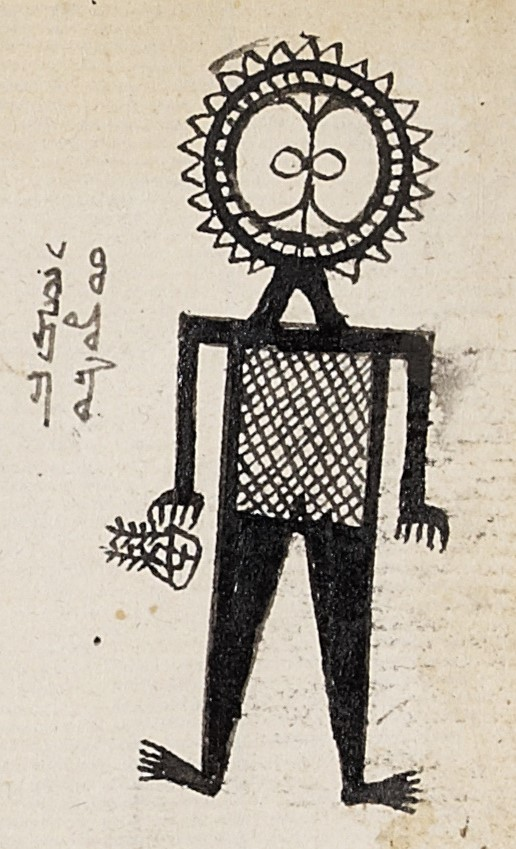
Yusmir the Šganda in MS DC 35 (Diwan Maṣbuta ḏ-Hibil Ziwa)

In Mandaeism, a shganda (šganda; Classical Mandaic: ࡔࡂࡀࡍࡃࡀ, Modern Mandaic pronunciation: [əʃˈgænda]), shkanda (Arabic: شكندا, romanized: škandā), or ashganda (ʔšganda) is a ritual assistant who helps priests with ritual duties.

In the Mandaean diaspora, shgandas, or alternatively learned laymen called yalufa, often perform minor priestly roles due to shortages of tarmida and ganzibra priests abroad.

== Tarmida initiations ==
Tarmida initiates or novices (šualia) have often been trained as shgandas when they were children. Initiates may or may not be married, although typically they are not yet married.

During tarmida initiation ceremonies, shgandas, who represent emissaries from the World of Light, also help perform the rituals, many of which are held in a specially constructed priest initiation hut (škinta) and also a nearby temporary reed hut (andiruna).

== Notable shgandas ==
- Salem Choheili (born 1935), scribe, teacher, and author in Ahvaz

== See also ==
- Acolyte
- Altar server
