= Morqos Faragalla =

Egyptian Coptic Catholic bishop (born 1967)

The Most Reverend Morqos Thomas Esam William Bolos Faragalla
- Bishop of Al Qusia
- Church: Coptic Catholic Church
- Province: Alexandria
- Diocese: Al Qusia
- Appointed: 31 March 2023
- Predecessor: Eparchy established
- Previous post: Protosyncellus of Eparchy of Asyut (2021–2023)

Orders
- Ordination: 4 January 1995 by Kyrillos William
- Consecration: 25 May 2023 by Ibrahim Isaac Sidrak

Personal details
- Born: Thomas Esam William Bolos Faragalla; 15 April 1967 (age 59) El Quseyya, Egypt
- Education: St. Leo the Great Patriarchal Seminary in Maadi

Morqos Thomas Esam William Bolos Faragalla (born 15 April 1967) is an Egyptian Coptic Catholic hierarch who has served as the first bishop of the Eparchy of Al Qusia since 2023.

== Biography ==
=== Early life and priesthood ===
Thomas Esam William Bolos Faragalla was born on 15 April 1967 in El Quseyya, Egypt. He studied philosophy and theology at the St. Leo the Great Patriarchal Seminary in Maadi, Cairo. He was ordained as a priest on 4 January 1995 for the Eparchy of Asyut by Bishop Kyrillos William.

Following his ordination, he served in various pastoral roles, including parish priest of the Cathedral of the Divine Motherhood in Asyut and of the parish in Giza. From 2000 to 2009, he served in the diaspora as a pastor for the Coptic Catholic community in Paris, France. Upon returning to Egypt, he served as the parish priest of the Cathedral in Asyut and was appointed protosyncellus (vicar general) of the Eparchy of Asyut in 2021.

=== Episcopacy ===
On 31 March 2023, the Synod of Bishops of the Coptic Catholic Church, having received the necessary assent from Pope Francis, elected him as the first bishop of the newly erected Eparchy of Al Qusia, taking the episcopal name Morqos (Mark). He received his episcopal consecration on 25 May 2023 at the Cathedral of the Sacred Heart in Al Qusiya from Patriarch Ibrahim Isaac Sidrak, assisted by other Catholic bishops.
