= Lake Mariout =

Brackish lake in northern Egypt

- بحيرة مريوط
- بحيرة مريوط
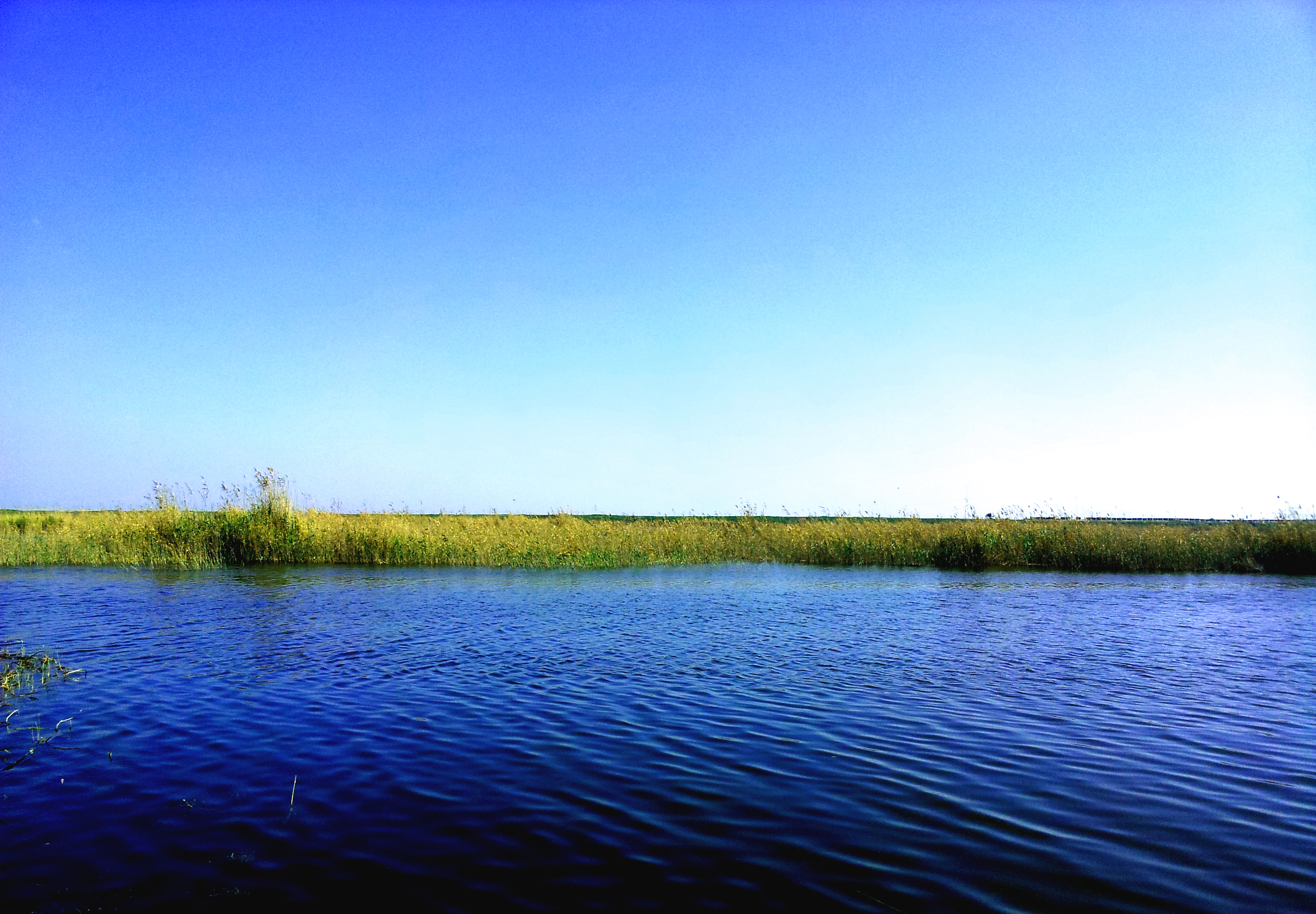

- Location within Egypt
- Coordinates: 31.153056°N 29.898611°E
- Lake type: Brackish
- Basin countries: Egypt
- Surface area: 50 square kilometres (19 sq mi) approx.
- Settlements: Alexandria

Lake Mariout (Arabic: بحيرة مريوط Boḥēret Maryūṭ, IPA: [boˈħeːɾet mɑɾˤˈjuːtˤ], also spelled Maryut or Mariut), is a brackish lake in northern Egypt near the city of Alexandria. The lake area covered 200 square kilometres (77 sq mi) and had a navigable canal at the beginning of the 20th century, but at the beginning of the 21st century, it covers only about 50 square kilometres (19 sq mi).

== Etymology ==
The name of Lake Mariout derives from the Hellenized name of Mareotis (Ancient Greek: Μαρεῶτις) or Marea, by which it was known in the Ptolemaic Period.

== Overview ==
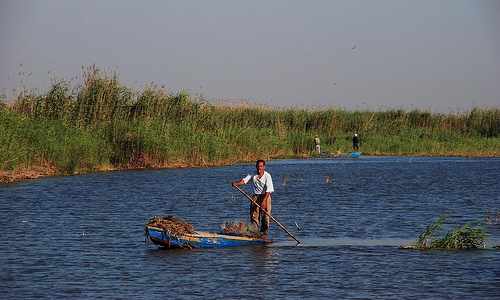
Lake Mariout in 2010

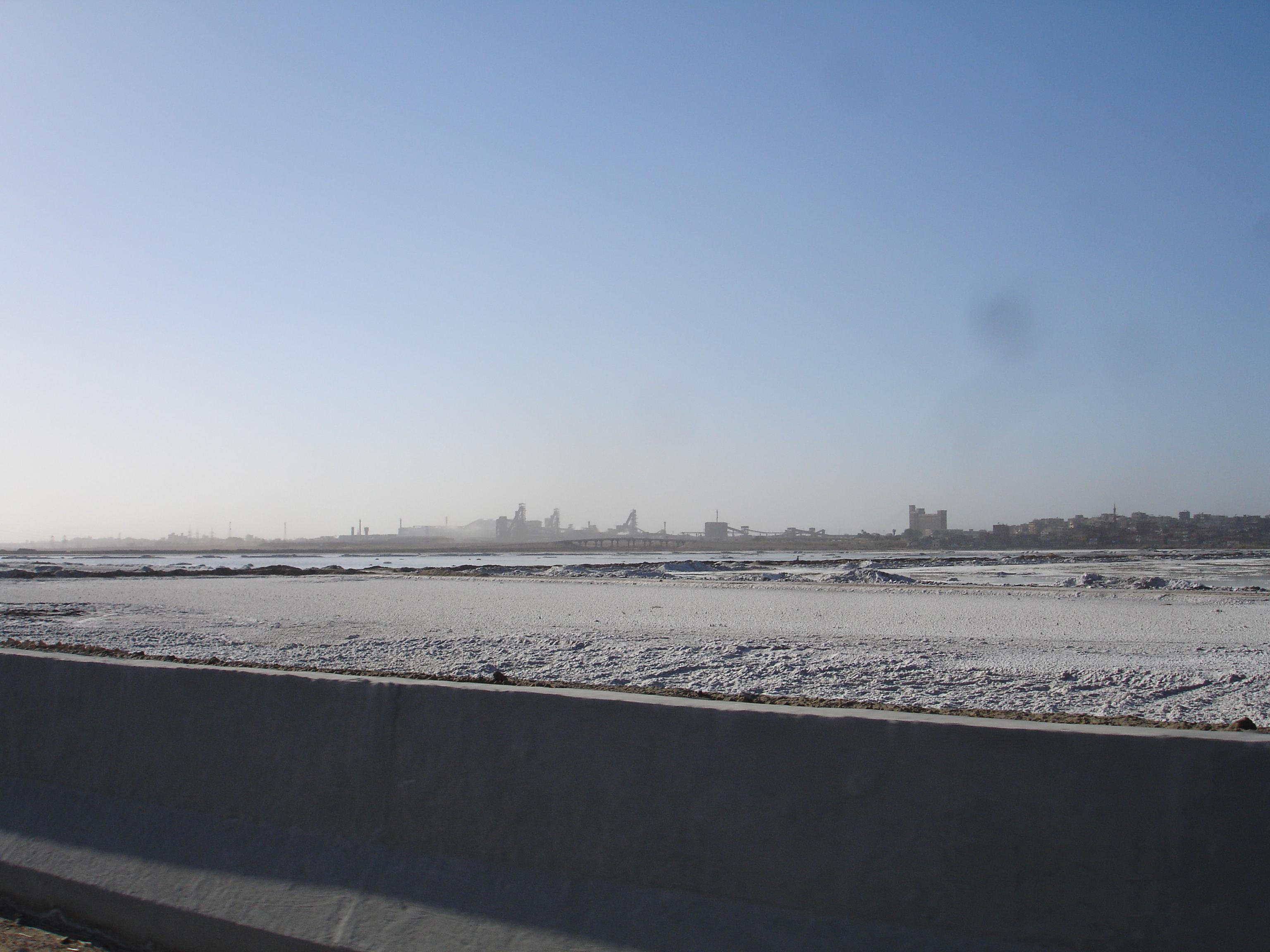
Salt refining, Lake Mariout

In antiquity, the lake was much larger than it is now, extending further to the south and west and occupying around 700 square kilometres (270 sq mi). It had no mouth connecting it to the Mediterranean, being fed with Nile water via a number of canals. By the twelfth century the lake had dwindled to a collection of salt lakes and salt flats and it had dried up by the Late Middle Ages.

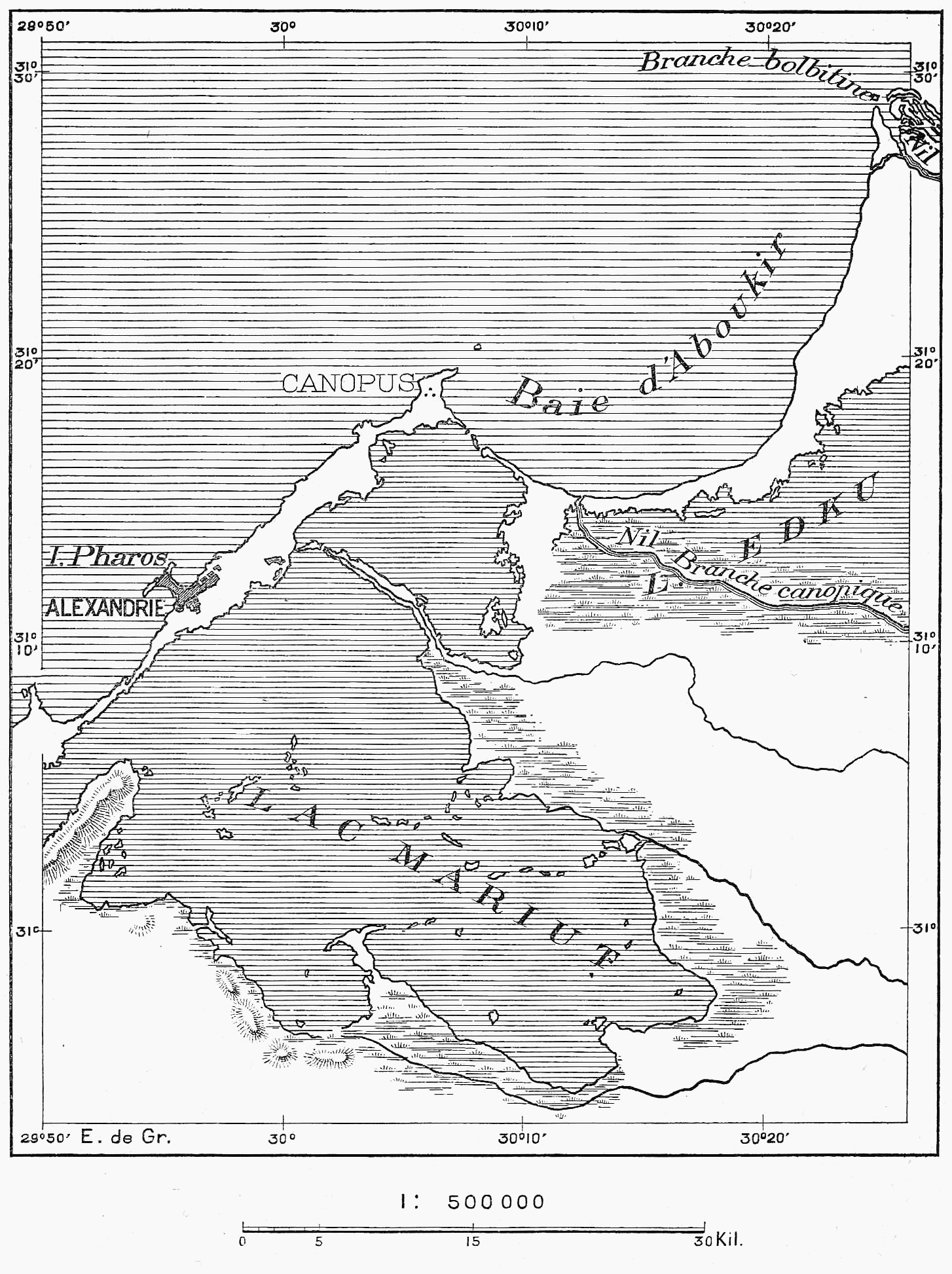
Lake Mariout and Lake Idku in ancient times, when their size was much larger. Lake Mariout then extended north as far as Alexandria, and there was a port city there named Portus Mareoticus

Until the 18th century the lake was fresh water, though much of it would dry up annually during the period shortly before the Nile flooded it again. A storm in 1770 breached the sea wall at Abu Qir, creating a seawater lake known as Lake Abu Qir. The salt waters were kept separate from Lake Mariout by the canal that allowed fresh water to travel from the Nile to Alexandria. As part of the Siege of Alexandria, on 13 March 1801, the British cut the canal, allowing a great rush of sea water from Lake Abu Qir into Lake Mariout. Lake Abu Qir ceased to exist, and Lake Mariout became brackish instead of fresh.

The salt-water flood also destroyed 150 villages while refilling Lake Mariout so that it suddenly regained its ancient area and became too shallow for navigation. Alexandria's access to the Nile was lost, necessitating the opening of the Mahmoudiyah Canal from Alexandria to the Nile in 1820.

Lake Mariout is separated from the Mediterranean Sea by the narrow isthmus on which the city of Alexandria was built. The lake shore is home to fisheries and saltworks. As far back as the early 1900s, it was documented that salt was being refined from the western part of the lake.

According to some records, a homonymous nome was located on the shores of this lake.

== Abusir ==
The seaside town of Abusir, known in the Graeco-Roman period as Taposiris Magna, lies on the shore of Lake Mariout. Ruins of an ancient temple and an ancient replica of the Lighthouse of Alexandria are to be seen there. As of 2009, it was also suspected to be the burial place of Cleopatra VII and Mark Antony.

== Philosophical and Ecclesiastical history ==
=== Therapeutae ===
The De Vita Contemplativa, a description of a society of ascetics written in the first century CE, says that the community of cenobitic monastics called the Therapeutae were widely distributed in the ancient world, but that "their country" was "beyond the Maereotic lake". Some interpret the Therapeutae as early Christian monks.

=== Christian church ===
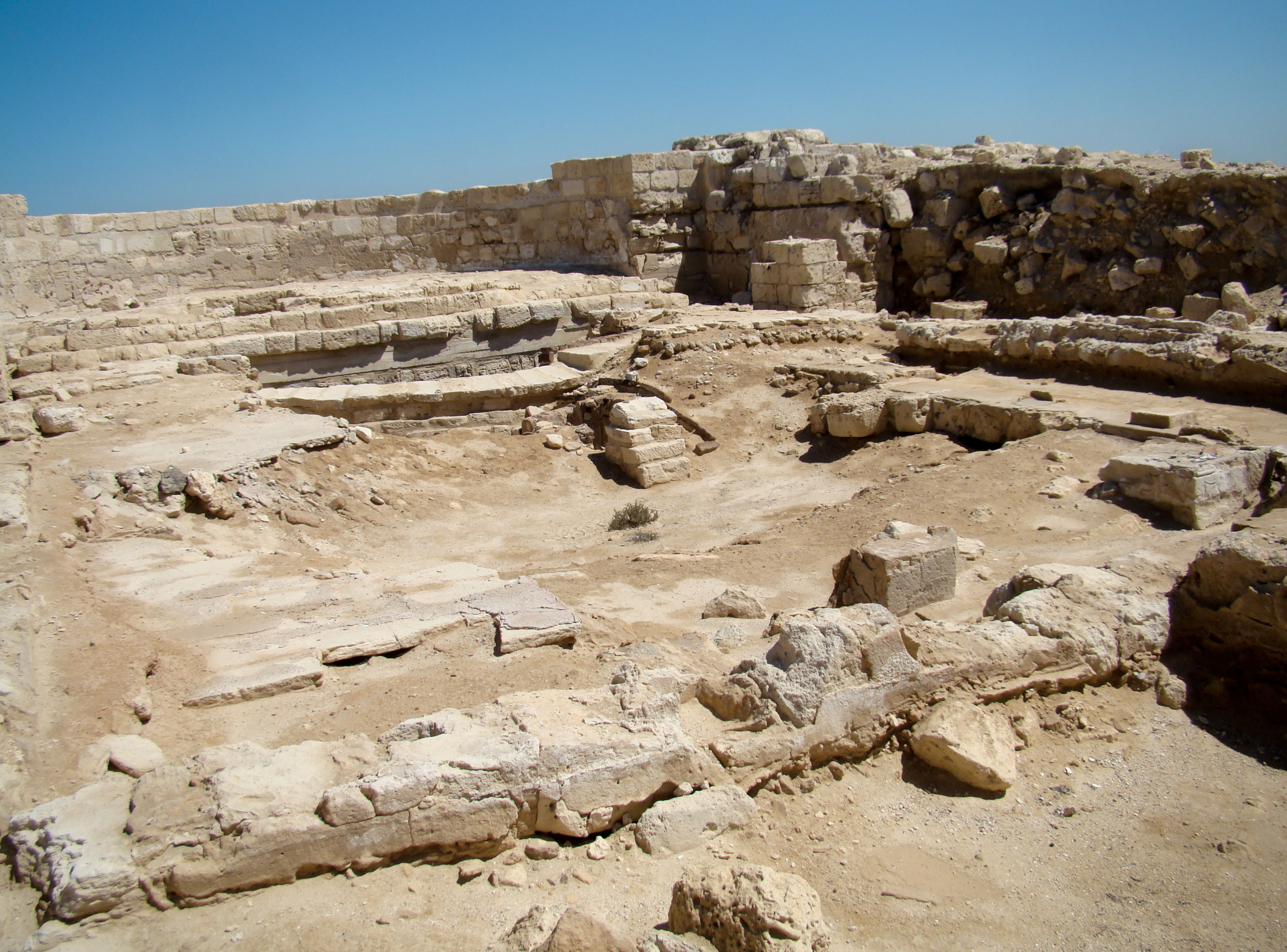
Basilica at Marea.

There was a bishopric of Mareotes, in the Roman province of Aegyptus Primus, which was a suffragan of the Metropolitan Archbishop of the Patriarchate of Alexandria. It faded like most of those in Roman Egypt, possibly at the advent of Islam. Two bishops are historically documented:

- Ischiras (mentioned circa 335)
- Pistos (mentioned in 337)

The diocese was nominally restored in 1933 as the titular bishopric of Mareotes. Although technically a Latin titular bishopric, it has had several Eastern Catholic incumbents, notably those of Egypt's native Coptic Catholic Church sui iuris (Alexandrian Rite).

It has had the following incumbents, so far of the fitting episcopal (lowest) rank:

- Antonios Aziz Mina (21 December 2002 – 3 January 2006) as Bishop of Curia of the Coptic Catholic Patriarchate of Alexandria (Egypt) ([19 December 2002] 21 December 2002 – 3 January 2006), followed by Eparch (Bishop) of Guizeh of the Copts (Egypt) (3 January 2006 – 23 January 2017)
- Botros Fahim Hanna (6 September 2006 – 8 April 2013) of the Coptic Catholic Patriarchate of Alexandria as Bishop of Curia of Egypt of the Copts ([31 August 2006] 6 September 2006 – 8 April 2013), followed by Eparch (Bishop) of Minya of the Copts (Egypt) ([25 March 2013] 8 April 2013 – ...)
- Cesar Essayan, Order of Friars Minor Conventual (O.F.M. Conv.) (2 August 2016 – ...) as Apostolic Vicar of Beirut (Lebanon).

== Ancient findings ==
In 2015 a stele, resembling the Rosetta Stone and dating back some 2200 years, was discovered in the Taposiris Magna Temple site at Lake Mariout. Measuring 41 by 25.6 by 7 inches (104 by 65 by 18 cm), its message commemorates two Ptolemaic pharaohs and Queen Consort Cleopatra I Syra. There are ancient tombs located on the shores of the lake.

== Fish species ==
The fish species Nile perch lives in the lake although its principal habitat is fresh water, and the lake contains some salt. In 1939, a small lake, called the Nozha Hydrodrome was "isolated from Lake Mariout" and this allowed for the Nile perch to flourish there.

== In literature ==
- W. B. Yeats refers to the lake as the Mareotic Lake in his poem "Under Ben Bulben".
- Lawrence Durrell writes about the lake using its ancient name Lake Mareotis in his tetralogy of novels The Alexandria Quartet, where it is the setting for a duck shoot.
- Jasper Maskelyne claimed in Magic: Top Secret (1949) to be involved in the construction of a decoy site next to the lake to draw Axis bombers away from attacking Alexandria Port during World War II.

== See also ==
- Abu Qir Bay
- List of Catholic dioceses in Egypt

== Bibliography ==
- Pius Bonifacius Gams, Series episcoporum Ecclesiae Catholicae, Leipzig 1931, p. 460
- Michel Lequien, Oriens christianus in quatuor Patriarchatus digestus, Paris 1740, vol. II, coll. 529-530
- Klaas A. Worp, A Checklist of Bishops in Byzantine Egypt (A.D. 325 - c. 750), in Zeitschrift für Papyrologie und Epigraphik 100 (1994) 283-318
