= Eparchy of Al Qusia =

Coptic Catholic eparchy in Egypt

Eparchy of Al Qusia Eparchia Cusanus

Location
- Territory: El Quseyya, Asyut Governorate
- Metropolitan: Alexandria
- Population: (as of 2022); 29,000

Information
- Sui iuris church: Coptic Catholic Church
- Rite: Alexandrian Rite
- Established: 23 September 2022
- Cathedral: Cathedral of the Sacred Heart

Current leadership
- Eparch: Morqos Faragalla

The Coptic Catholic Eparchy of Al Qusia (or El Quseyya, also known as Qusquam; Latin: Eparchia Cusanus) is a suffragan eparchy (Eastern Catholic diocese) of the Coptic Catholic Church, an Eastern Catholic Church in full communion with the Holy See which utilizes the Alexandrian liturgical rite.

The eparchy's territory covers the region around the city of El Quseyya in the Asyut Governorate of Egypt. Its cathedral see is the Church of the Sacred Heart, located in El Quseyya (Qusquam).

== History ==
The eparchy was erected on 23 September 2022 by His Beatitude Ibrahim Isaac Sidrak, the Coptic Catholic Patriarch of Alexandria, with the consent of the Synod of Bishops of the Coptic Catholic Church and after consulting the Holy See, in accordance with canon 85 of the Code of Canons of the Eastern Churches (CCEO). Its territory was divested from the Eparchy of Asyut.

Upon its erection, Bishop Basilios Fawzy Al-Dabe, the Eparch of Minya, was designated as the Patriarchal Administrator of the new eparchy until a permanent bishop could be selected. On 31 March 2023, the Synod of Bishops announced the election of Father Thomas Esam William Bolos Faragalla as the first resident eparch, taking the episcopal name Morqos.

== Statistics ==
At the time of its canonical erection in late 2022, the eparchy consisted of 13 parishes serving approximately 29,000 Coptic Catholic faithful. The pastoral care was initially provided by 16 eparchial (diocesan) priests, 5 men religious, and 16 women religious.

== Eparchial Bishops ==
  - Basilios Fawzy Al-Dabe (23 September 2022 – 25 May 2023), Patriarchal Administrator
- Morqos Faragalla (31 March 2023 – present)
