= Kyrillos William =

Egyptian Coptic Catholic bishop (1946–2023)

The Most Reverend Kyrillos William
- Bishop Emeritus of Asyut
- Church: Coptic Catholic Church
- Province: Alexandria
- Diocese: Asyut
- Installed: 16 May 1990
- Term ended: 3 November 2021
- Predecessor: Youhanna Nueir
- Successor: Daniel Lotfy Khella
- Other posts: Apostolic Visitator for Coptic Catholics in the United States and Canada (2022–2023)

Orders
- Ordination: 10 June 1974 by Youhanna Nueir
- Consecration: 3 June 1990 by Stéphanos II Ghattas

Personal details
- Born: Kamal William Samaan; 1 October 1946 Ash Shanainah, Asyut Governorate, Kingdom of Egypt
- Died: 11 May 2023 (aged 76) Cairo, Egypt
- Buried: Cathedral of the Mother of Divine Love, Asyut
- Education: Pontifical Urban University, Pontifical Biblical Institute, Pontifical Gregorian University

Kyrillos William (born Kamal William Samaan; 1 October 1946 – 11 May 2023) was an Egyptian Coptic Catholic hierarch who served as the Bishop of the Eparchy of Asyut from 1990 until his retirement in 2021. After his tenure as diocesan bishop, he briefly served as the Apostolic Visitator for Coptic Catholic faithful in the United States and Canada since 2022 to 2023.

== Early life and education ==
Kamal William Samaan was born on 1 October 1946 in the village of Ash Shanainah, within the Asyut Governorate of Egypt. He felt a religious vocation early in life and completed his preparatory philosophical and theological studies at the St. Leo the Great Patriarchal Seminary in Maadi.

He was ordained to the priesthood on 10 June 1974 by Bishop Youhanna Nueir, after he was forced to do five years of military service, before being ordained. Following his ordination, he was sent to Rome for post-graduate education. He earned a degree in theology from the Pontifical Urban University and a subsequent licentiate in biblical studies from the Pontifical Biblical Institute in 1981 and made doctorate from the Pontifical Gregorian University in 1983.

== Pastoral ministry and academic career ==
Upon returning to Egypt, he served as a professor of sacred scripture at the Patriarchal Seminary in Maadi. He later assumed leadership roles within the institution, serving as its vice-rector and subsequently as its rector from 1986 until 1990.

== Episcopate ==
On 16 May 1990, Pope John Paul II confirmed the decision of the Synod of the Coptic Catholic Church, that elected him to serve as the Bishop of Asyut, succeeding Youhanna Nueir. He took the episcopal name Kyrillos. His episcopal consecration took place on 3 June 1990, led by Patriarch Stephanos II Ghattas, with other Coptic Catholic bishops serving as co-consecrators.

Throughout his 31-year episcopate in Asyut, William oversaw significant expansion of Catholic educational, medical, and charitable institutions. He was highly regarded for promoting interfaith coexistence between Coptic Christians and Muslims in a region historically impacted by sectarian tensions. He frequently acted as a spokesperson for the Coptic community during periods of social and political upheaval in Egypt, notably speaking out against religious extremism and the destruction of local Christian properties, describing persecuted Christian minorities as "living martyrs."

=== Roman Curia and international appointments ===
William held several prominent appointments within the universal Catholic Church. On 31 January 2003, Pope John Paul II appointed him a member of the Preparatory Committee for the Catholic Church-Oriental Orthodox Churches International Joint Commission for Dialogue and on 8 May 2010 he was appointed a member of the Special Council for Africa of the General Secretariat of the Synod of Bishops by Pope Benedict XVI.

In 2019, he became a co-president of the Joint International Commission for Theological Dialogue between the Catholic Church and the Eastern Orthodox Churches.

=== Later life and death ===
Having reached the age limit, Bishop William submitted his resignation from the pastoral governance of the Eparchy of Asyut, which was officially accepted by Patriarch Ibrahim Isaac Sidrak and the Coptic Synod on 3 November 2021.

Despite his retirement from diocesan governance, Pope Francis assigned him a new service on 30 September 2022, naming him the Apostolic Visitator for Coptic Catholics in the United States and Canada.

Bishop William died on 11 May 2023 at a hospital in Cairo following a brief illness. His funeral liturgy was celebrated at the Cathedral of the Mother of Divine Love in Asyut, where his remains were subsequently entombed.
