= Botros Fahim Hanna =

Egyptian Coptic Catholic bishop (born 1961)

His Excellency, The Most Reverend Botros Fahim Hanna
- Church: Coptic Catholic Church
- See: Minya
- Installed: 25 March 2013
- Term ended: 7 October 2020
- Predecessor: Ibrahim Isaac Sidrak
- Successor: Basilios Fawzy Al-Dabe
- Previous posts: Titular Bishop of Mareotes (2006–2013); Curial Bishop of Alexandria (2006–2013)

Orders
- Ordination: 20 May 1988 by Antonios Naguib
- Consecration: 13 October 2006 by Antonios Naguib

Personal details
- Born: Kamal Fahim Awad Hanna; 3 July 1961 (age 65) Tawa, Minya Governorate, Egypt
- Education: Pontifical Gregorian University

Botros Fahim Awad Hanna (born Kamal Fahim Awad Hanna; 3 July 1961) is an Egyptian Coptic Catholic hierarch, who served as the Eparch (Bishop) of the Eparchy of Minya from 2013 until his resignation in 2020. Prior to this, he served as the Curial Bishop of the Coptic Catholic Patriarchate of Alexandria and Titular Bishop of Mareotes from 2006 to 2013.

== Early life and ministry ==
Fahim Hanna was born on 3 July 1961 in the village of Tawa, located near the city of Minya in the Minya Governorate, Egypt. He studied philosophy and theology at the St. Leo Grand Seminary in Maadi, Cairo. He was ordained to the priesthood on 20 May 1988 for the Eparchy of Minya by Bishop Antonios Naguib.

Following his ordination, he pursued higher academic studies in Rome. He attended the Pontifical Gregorian University, where he obtained a doctorate in biblical theology. Upon returning to Egypt, he served in various pastoral and academic roles, including as a parish priest, a professor of theology, and later as the rector of the St. Leo Grand Seminary in Maadi (2005–2006).

== Episcopate ==
On 31 August 2006, the Synod of Bishops of the Coptic Catholic Church elected Hanna as the Curial Bishop of the Patriarchate of Alexandria. Following election confirmation by Pope Benedict XVI on 6 September 2006, he was assigned the titular see of Mareotes. He received his episcopal consecration on 13 October 2006 from the Coptic Catholic Patriarch, Antonios Naguib, with Patriarch Emeritus Cardinal Stéphanos II Ghattas and other bishops serving as co-consecrators.

On 25 March 2013, the Coptic Catholic Synod elected Hanna to succeed Ibrahim Isaac Sidrak (who had been elevated to Patriarch) as the Eparch of Minya, the largest Coptic Catholic diocese in Egypt. It was published by the Holy See on 8 April 2013. He was formally enthroned in the Cathedral of Minya on 19 April 2013. During his tenure in Minya, he focused on strengthening youth ministry, medical services, and Catholic education within the eparchy.

On 7 October 2020, the Synod of Bishops of the Coptic Catholic Church accepted Hanna's resignation from the pastoral governance of the Eparchy of Minya due to health reasons. He was succeeded by Patriarch Ibrahim Isaac Sidrak as a Patriarchal Administrator, and later by Bishop Basilios Fawzy Al-Dabe.
