= Council of Catholic Patriarchs of the East =

Agency of the Catholic Church

The Council of Catholic Patriarchs of the Orient (French: Conseil des Patriarches Catholiques d'Orient, CPCO) is an agency of the Catholic Church that meets the patriarchs of Eastern Catholic Churches and the Latin Patriarch of Jerusalem. Permanent seat of the organisation is the Maronite Catholic Patriarchate of Antioch in Bkerke, Lebanon.

== Nature and objectives ==
The nature of the Conference has to be a sign and instrument of patriarchal collegiality and communion between the Eastern Catholic Churches and the universal Church. It aims to:

- reflect on and promote the Christian life in the Middle East
- coordinate pastoral activity, said the future of Christianity in those lands, and strengthen ties among the faithful to the homeland and the diaspora
- promote ecumenical and interreligious dialogue
- ensure the active participation of Catholics in the Council of Churches of the Middle East
- promote peace, development, respect for the rights of man and woman.

== History ==
19-24 August 1991: I Annual Conference in Bikfaya in Lebanon

1992: Second Annual Congress at Coptic Patriarchal Seminary, Egypt

1993: Third Annual Conference for Latin bishopric in Amman, Jordan

19-24 September 1994: Fourth Annual Conference at the Melkite patriarchal residence in Raboueh, Lebanon

4-11 September 1995: Fifth Annual Conference on Armenian Catholic Patriarchate in Bzoummar near Beirut

13-18 October 1996: Sixth Annual Conference at the patriarchal residence in Syriac Convent of Our Lady of Deliverance in Sharfeh, Lebanon

19-25 October 1997: Seventh Annual Conference in Alexandria, Egypt

11-16 October 1998: Eighth Annual Conference in Amman, Jordan

3-6 November 1999: Ninth Annual Conference at the Maronite Patriarchate in Bkerke: Pastoral Letter of Catholic Patriarchs of the East on the movement œcuménique

16-20 October 2000: Tenth Annual Conference on Armenian Catholic Patriarchate in Bzoummar

23-27 September 2001: Eleventh Annual Conference at the patriarchal residence in Syriac Convent of Our Lady of Deliverance in Sharfeh, Lebanon

16-20 October 2006: XVI Annual Conference at the Armenian Catholic Patriarchate in Bzoummar, Lebanon

15-19 October 2007: XVII Annual Conference at the summer Melkite patriarchal residence in Ain Traz, near Beirut

25-29 November 2019: Cairo, Egypt, where they met the President of Egypt Abdel Fattah el-Sisi and Coptic Orthodox Pope Tawadros II of Alexandria.

== Members ==
- Ibrahim Isaac Sidrak, Patriarch of Alexandria of the Coptic Catholic Church
- Béchara Boutros Raï, Patriarch of Antioch of the Maronite Church
- Youssef Absi, Patriarch of Antioch of the Melkite Greek Catholic Church
- Ignace Joseph III Younan, Patriarch of Antioch of the Syriac Catholic Church
- Louis Raphaël I Sako, Patriarch of Babylon of the Chaldean Catholic Church
- Raphaël Bedros XXI Minassian, Patriarch of Cilicia of the Armenian Catholic Church
- Pierbattista Pizzaballa, Latin Patriarch of Jerusalem
