= Bechara Giuda =

Egyptian Coptic Catholic bishop (born 1971)

Bechara Giuda OFM
- Bishop of Abu Qurqas
- Church: Coptic Catholic Church
- Diocese: Abu Qurqas
- Installed: 7 January 2020
- Predecessor: Position established

Orders
- Ordination: 8 June 2001 by Morkos Hakim
- Consecration: 27 February 2020 by Ibrahim Isaac Sidrak

Personal details
- Born: Bechara Giuda Matta; 28 August 1971 (age 55) Al-Nujaila, Sohag Governorate, Egypt
- Residence: Abu Qirqas, Egypt
- Education: Saint Paul University, Harissa

Bechara Giuda Matta OFM (born 28 August 1971) is an Egyptian Coptic Catholic hierarch. He has served as the first bishop of the Eparchy of Abu Qurqas since its establishment in 2020.

== Biography ==
Bechara Giuda was born on 28 August 1971 in the village of Al-Nujaila, located in the Sohag Governorate, Egypt. He entered the Seraphic Seminary of the Franciscans in Asyut in 1983. He later completed his temporary profession on 1 September 1996 and pronounced his solemn vows on 23 March 2001 within the Order of Friars Minor (Franciscans).

Giuda studied philosophy at the Franciscan Seminary in Giza. Following his mandatory military service, he pursued his theological training, initially studying at the Patriarchal Seminary in Maadi, Cairo, and subsequently graduating from Saint Paul University in Harissa, Lebanon. He was ordained to the priesthood on 8 June 2001 in his native village of Al-Nujaila by Bishop Morkos Hakim, the Coptic Catholic Bishop of Sohag.

Following his ordination, Giuda held several pastoral and administrative roles within the Franciscan order in Egypt. He served as a parish priest in Kom Ombo, the superior of the religious community in Hurghada, and a counselor for the Franciscan Egyptian province. Since 2010 he has served as pastor and guardian of the Shrine of the Stigmata of Saint Francis in Assiut.

On 7 January 2020, following the assent of Pope Francis, the Synod of Bishops of the Coptic Catholic Church officially established the Eparchy of Abu Qurqas, carving it out of the territory of the Eparchy of Minya. Giuda was elected as its first eparchial bishop.

He received his episcopal consecration on 27 February 2020 from Ibrahim Isaac Sidrak, the Coptic Catholic Patriarch of Alexandria, with other Coptic Catholic bishops serving as co-consecrators.
