= Thomas Halim Habib =

Egyptian Coptic Catholic bishop (born 1963)

Most Reverend Thomas Halim Habib
- Eparch of Sohag
- Church: Coptic Catholic Church
- Province: Alexandria
- Diocese: Sohag
- Installed: 3 November 2020
- Predecessor: Basilios Fawzy Al-Dabe
- Other posts: Apostolic Visitator for Coptic Catholics in Oceania and the Gulf States (since 2022)
- Previous post: Diplomatic service of the Holy See (1998–2020)

Orders
- Ordination: 27 March 1994
- Consecration: 23 January 2021 by Ibrahim Isaac Sidrak

Personal details
- Born: Thomas Halim Habib; 6 July 1963 (age 63) Sohag, Egypt
- Residence: Sohag, Egypt
- Education: Cairo University; Pontifical Urban University; Pontifical Oriental Institute; Pontifical Ecclesiastical Academy

Thomas Halim Habib (born 6 July 1963) is an Egyptian Coptic Catholic hierarch and former diplomat of the Holy See. He has served as the Eparch (Bishop) of the Eparchy of Sohag since 2020. He concurrently serves as an Apostolic Visitator for Coptic Catholics in Oceania and the Gulf States since 2022.

== Early life and ministry ==
Thomas Halim Habib was born on 6 July 1963 in Sohag, Egypt. Before discerning a vocation to the priesthood, he pursued a secular education in law at Cairo University, earning a degree and practicing as a lawyer in Egypt.

He later entered the seminary and completed his institutional cycle of ecclesiastical studies at the Pontifical Urban University in Rome. He was ordained a priest on 27 March 1994 for the Patriarchal Eparchy of Alexandria of the Copts. Following his ordination, he completed a doctorate in canon law at the Pontifical Oriental Institute and was placed in charge of the Coptic Catholic diaspora community in Rome. He then entered the Pontifical Ecclesiastical Academy to prepare for the diplomatic service.

== Diplomatic career ==
Habib officially entered the diplomatic service of the Holy See on 13 June 1998. Over the next two decades, he served in numerous apostolic nunciatures across the globe, initially as secretary and later as counselor. His postings included assignments in Honduras, Rwanda, Kuwait, Iran, Iraq, Lebanon, the Netherlands, Algeria, Syria, and Malta.

His final diplomatic role before returning to Egypt was as the First Counsellor at the Apostolic Nunciature to Kuwait and the Arabian Peninsula, where he supported the local Catholic immigrant populations and handled relations with civil authorities.

== Episcopal ministry ==
On 3 November 2020, the Synod of Bishops of the Coptic Catholic Church elected Habib as the Eparch of the Eparchy of Sohag, filling the vacancy left by Basilios Fawzy Al-Dabe's transfer to Minya. Pope Francis granted his assent to the election on the same day. He received his episcopal consecration on 23 January 2021 from Coptic Catholic Patriarch Ibrahim Isaac Sidrak, with other Coptic Catholic bishops serving as co-consecrators.

As bishop, Habib has frequently highlighted the local and socio-political climate in Egypt, noting that Christians enjoy greater religious freedom while simultaneously managing economic and demographic pressures that drive migration.

On 30 September 2022, Pope Francis appointed him as the Apostolic Visitator for Coptic Catholic faithful residing in Oceania and the Gulf States.
