= Youssef Aboul-Kheir =

Egyptian Coptic Catholic bishop (born 1943)

His Excellency, The Most Reverend Youssef Aboul-Kheir
- Bishop Emeritus of Sohag
- Church: Coptic Catholic Church
- Province: Patriarchate of Alexandria
- Diocese: Sohag
- Installed: 9 August 2003
- Term ended: 14 June 2019
- Predecessor: Morkos Hakim
- Successor: Basilios Fawzy Al-Dabe

Orders
- Ordination: 17 September 1972 by Andraos Ghattas
- Consecration: 13 November 2003 by Stéphanos II Ghattas

Personal details
- Born: Youssef Aboul-Kheir; 23 September 1943 (age 82) Kom Gharib, Girga Governorate, Kingdom of Egypt
- Residence: Sohag, Egypt
- Education: St. Leo Coptic Catholic Patriarchal Seminary; Cairo University; Pontifical Urban University

Youssef Aboul-Kheir (born 23 September 1943) is an Egyptian Coptic Catholic hierarch who served as the Bishop of the Eparchy of Sohag from 2003 until his retirement in 2019.

== Early life and education ==
Youssef Aboul-Kheir was born on 23 September 1943 in Kom Gharib, in the present day Sohag Governorate of Egypt. He pursued his ecclesiastical studies at the St. Leo Coptic Catholic Patriarchal Seminary in Maadi, Cairo. He also studied psychology at Cairo University, earning his degree in 1972. Following his initial formation, he was sent to Rome, where he completed his higher education in dogmatic theology at the Pontifical Urban University.

== Priesthood ==
He was ordained to the priesthood on 17 September 1972 for Eparchy of Luxor by Bishop Andraos Ghattas. After ordination, Aboul-Kheir served as a parish priest in various locations, including the Cathedral of Sohag and parishes in Tahta and its surroundings. He later served as a spiritual director at the Patriarchal Seminary in Maadi before becoming the parish priest in the parish of the Holy Virgin Mary in Gergia in Sohag (1980–2003).

== Episcopate ==
On 5 August 2003, the Synod of Bishops of the Coptic Catholic Church elected Aboul-Kheir as the Bishop of Sohag, succeeding Morkos Hakim. Pope John Paul II confirmed the election on 9 August 2003. He was consecrated as bishop on 13 November 2003 by Coptic Catholic Patriarch Stéphanos II Ghattas, assisted by other Coptica Catholic bishops.

During his episcopate, Aboul-Kheir was an outspoken voice for Christian-Muslim national unity in Egypt, particularly during times of sectarian tension. Following the mass execution of 21 Coptic Christians by ISIS militants in Libya in 2015, Aboul-Kheir emphasized that the tragedy served to unify Egyptian society rather than fracture it, highlighting the solidarity shown by Muslim neighbors and state leaders during the national period of mourning.

Upon reaching the canonical age limit, Bishop Aboul-Kheir submitted his resignation. On 14 June 2019, the Synod of Bishops of the Coptic Catholic Church accepted his retirement, and he was succeeded by Bishop Basilios Fawzy Al-Dabe.
