= Eparchy of Asyut =

Coptic Catholic eparchy in Egypt

Eparchy of Asyut Eparchia Lycopolitana

Location
- Territory: Asyut Governorate

Statistics
- Population: 26,670 (2023)
- Parishes: 28 (2023)

Information
- Sui iuris church: Coptic Catholic Church
- Rite: Alexandrian Rite
- Established: 10 August 1947
- Cathedral: Mother of Divine Grace Cathedral, Assiut

Current leadership
- Eparch: Daniel Lotfy Khella

Map
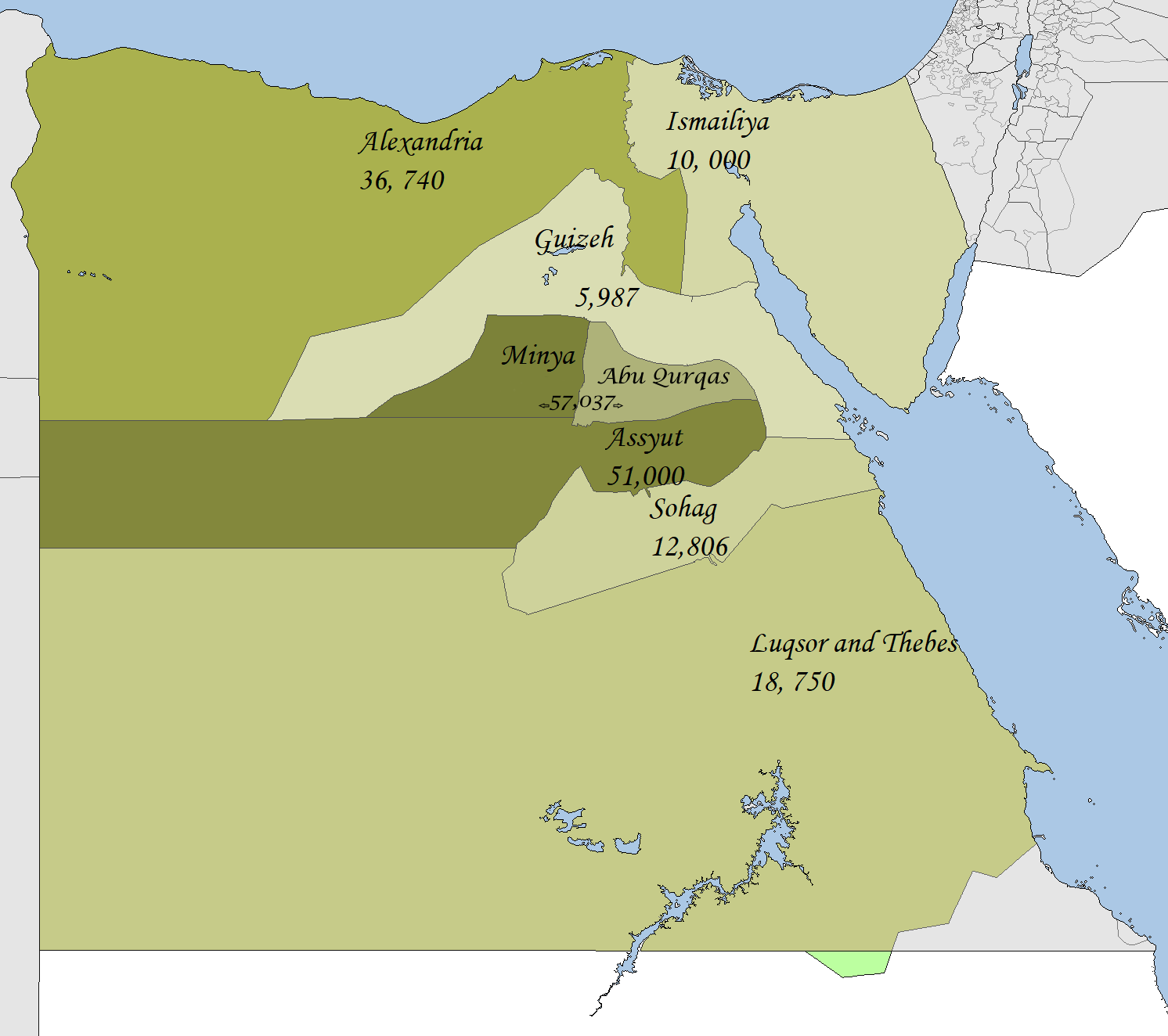

The Coptic Catholic Eparchy of Asyut (or Lycopolis) is a suffragan eparchy (Eastern Catholic diocese) of the Coptic Catholic Church, an Eastern Catholic Church in full communion with the Holy See that follows the Alexandrian Rite.

The eparchy's cathedral and episcopal see is the Mother of Divine Grace Cathedral, located in the city of Asyut (historic Lycopolis), the capital of the Asyut Governorate in Egypt.

== History ==
The eparchy was erected on 10 August 1947 by Pope Pius XII through the apostolic constitution Ex quo in Petri, which split the southern territory of the Eparchy of Hermopolis (Minya) to form the new jurisdiction. Its borders were adjusted slightly on 21 January 1949 by the decree Cum in regionibus from the Sacred Congregation for the Oriental Churches to better align ecclesiastical limits with civil provincial boundaries.

The eparchy acts as a key religious, pastoral, and educational hub for the Coptic Catholic community in Upper Egypt, managing numerous schools, charities, and healthcare clinics across the region.

On 23 September 2023 from Eparchy of Assiut was erected the Eparchy of Al Qusia with 13 parishes.

== Eparchial Bishops ==
- Alexandros Scandar (9 August 1947 – 29 December 1964, died), archbishop since 1963
- Youhanna Nueir, OFM (26 March 1965 – 20 March 1990, retired)
- Kyrillos William (16 May 1990 – 3 November 2021, retired)
- Daniel Lotfy Khella (23 September 2022 – present)

=== Coadjutor Bishop ===
- Aghnatios Elias Yaacoub SJ (19 May 1983 – 15 July 1986)
