= Eparchy of Abu Qurqas =

Coptic Catholic eparchy in Egypt

Eparchy of Abu Qurqas Eparchia Abucurcasensis

Location
- Territory: Abu Qirqas, Minya Governorate
- Metropolitan: Patriarchate of Alexandria
- Population: 42,000

Information
- Sui iuris church: Coptic Catholic Church
- Rite: Alexandrian Rite
- Established: 7 January 2020
- Cathedral: Cathedral of St. Anthony of Padua

Current leadership
- Eparch: Bechara Giuda, O.F.M.

Map
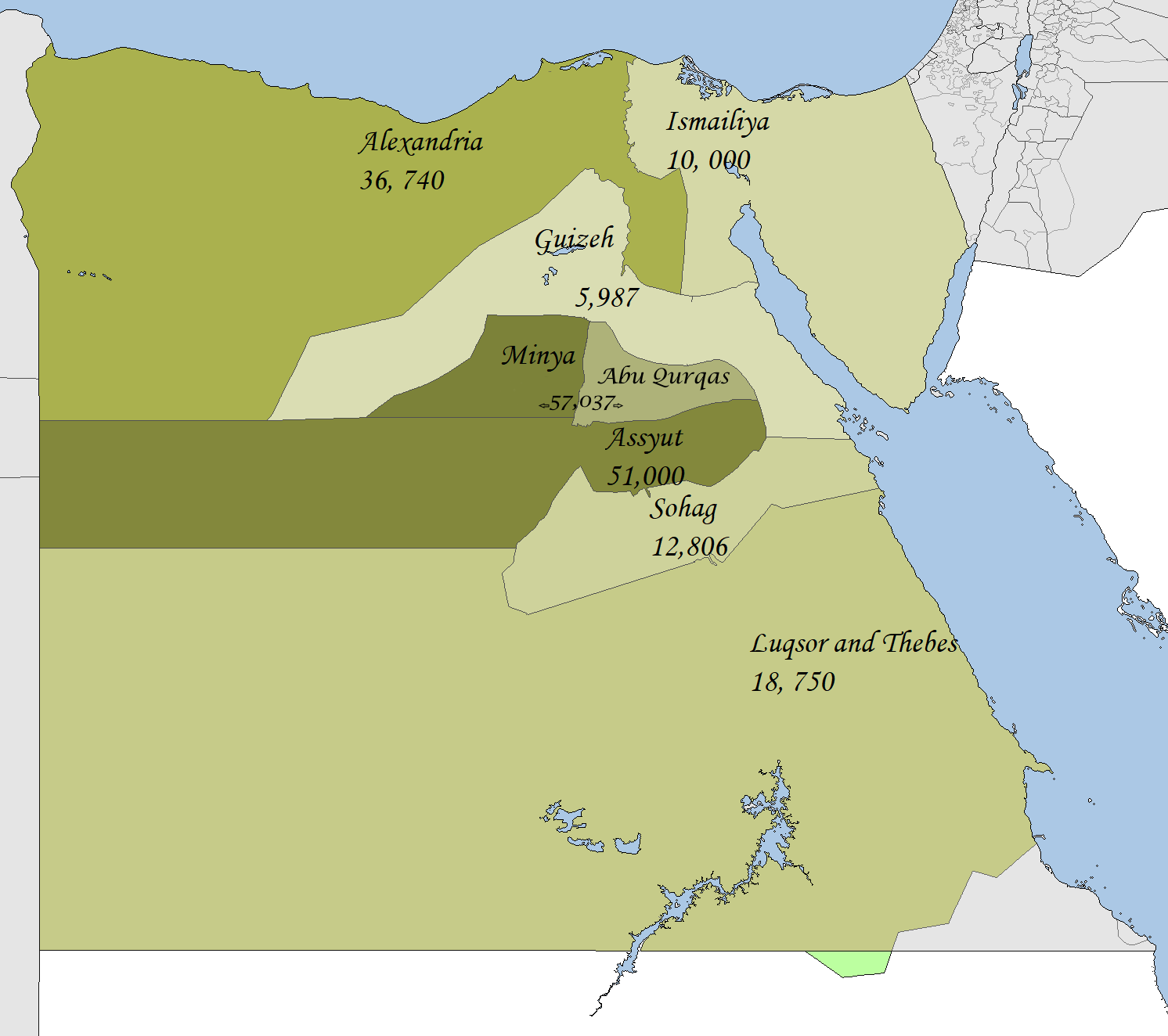

The Coptic Catholic Eparchy of Abu Qurqas (Latin: Eparchia Abuquerquensis) is a suffragan eparchy (Eastern Catholic diocese) of the Coptic Catholic Church, an Eastern Catholic church in full communion with the Holy See (Catholic Church).

The eparchy's territory covers the district of Abu Qirqas within the Minya Governorate in Upper Egypt. Its cathedral see is the Cathedral of Saint Anthony of Padua, located in the city of Abu Qurqas.

== History ==
The Eparchy of Abu Qurqas was officially erected on 7 January 2020 by Pope Francis, following the assent of the Synod of Bishops of the Coptic Catholic Church. Its territory was carved out of the northern portion of the Eparchy of Minya, which had previously accommodated a growing population of Coptic Catholic faithful.

Upon its creation, the Reverend Father Bechara Giuda Matta, O.F.M., was elected by the Coptic Synod as its first eparchial bishop, receiving papal confirmation on the same day. The formal installation and enthronement ceremony took place at the St. Anthony of Padua Cathedral later that year.

At the time of its foundation, the eparchy administered approximately 21 parishes and served a population of roughly 40,000 Coptic Catholic faithful.

== Eparchial Bishops ==
- Bechara Giuda, O.F.M. (7 January 2020 – present)
