= Bakhoum Kiroulos =

Egyptian Coptic Catholic bishop (born 1974)

Most Reverend Bakhoum Kiroulos
- Curial Bishop of the Coptic Catholic Patriarchate of Alexandria
- Church: Coptic Catholic Church
- Archdiocese: Alexandria (Coptic)
- Appointed: 14 June 2019
- Other post: Titular Bishop of Cabasa (since 2019)

Orders
- Ordination: 29 December 2004
- Consecration: 31 August 2019 by Ibrahim Isaac Sidrak

Personal details
- Born: Hani Nassif Wasef Kiroulos; 4 May 1974 (age 52) Cairo, Egypt
- Education: Ain Shams University, Pontifical Urban University, Pontifical Gregorian University, Pontifical Lateran University

Bakhoum Hani Nassif Wasef Kiroulos (born 4 May 1974) is an Egyptian Coptic Catholic hierarch who has served as the Curial Bishop of the Coptic Catholic Patriarchate of Alexandria and the Titular Bishop of Cabasa since 2019.

== Early life and education ==
Bakhoum Kiroulos was born in Cairo, Egypt, on 4 May 1974. He studied telecommunication engineering at Ain Shams University, graduating in 1996.

Feeling a religious calling, he entered the St. Leo Coptic Catholic Patriarchal Seminary in Maadi. He completed his theological preparation and was ordained a priest on 29 December 2004 for the Eparchy of the Patriarchate of Alexandria.

Following his ordination, he completed advanced ecclesiastical studies in Rome. He earned a bachelor's degree in theology from the Pontifical Urban University (Propaganda Fide), a licentiate in canon law from the Pontifical Gregorian University, and a doctorate in canon law from the Pontifical Lateran University.

== Priesthood ==
Upon returning to Egypt, Father Kiroulos served in several pastoral and administrative roles within the Coptic Catholic Church. He served as the parish priest of the Church of Our Lady of Peace in Sharm El Sheikh.

His administrative appointments included serving as the chancellor of the Patriarchal Curia and as the personal secretary to Patriarch Ibrahim Isaac Sidrak. He was also heavily involved in Catholic communications, serving as the director of the Church's media office and organizing significant public events, including the media coverage for Pope Francis's pastoral visit to Egypt in 2017.

== Episcopate ==
On 14 June 2019, Pope Francis officially assented to his election by the Synod of the Coptic Catholic Church as the Curial Bishop of the Patriarchate of Alexandria, assigning him the titular see of Cabasa.

He was consecrated as a bishop on 31 August 2019 at the Cathedral of Our Lady of Egypt in Nasr City, Cairo. The principal consecrator was Patriarch Ibrahim Isaac Sidrak, assisted by other bishops of the Coptic Catholic Synod. As Curial Bishop, he assists the Patriarch in the central administration of the Coptic Catholic Church while continuing to oversee public relations and social communications for the patriarchate.
