= Giuda =

Giuda is an Italian surname. Notable people with the surname include:

- Bechara Giuda (born 1971), Egyptian Coptic Catholic bishop
- Bob Giuda (born 1952), American former international airline captain, former United States Marine and later New Hampshire state senator
- Michelle Giuda (born 1987), American businessperson and former government official

== See also ==
- Gioda
