= Coptic church =

Coptic church may refer to:

- The Coptic Orthodox Church, a church in the Oriental Orthodox communion
- The Coptic Catholic Church, one of the Eastern Catholic Churches in communion with the Holy See
- The Ethiopian Orthodox Tewahedo Church, an Oriental Orthodox Christian church in Sub-Saharan Africa
