= Youhanna Nueir =

Egyptian clergyman

Youhanna Nueir O.F.M.
- Eparch of Asyut
- Church: Coptic Catholic Church
- Diocese: Eparchy of Asyut
- In office: 26 March 1965 – 20 March 1990
- Predecessor: Alexandros Habib Scandar
- Successor: Kyrillos William
- Other post: Patriarchal Administrator of Sohag (1981-1982)
- Previous posts: Titular Eparch of Phatanus (1955-1965); Auxiliary Eparch of Luxor (1955-1965)

Orders
- Ordination: 13 June 1943
- Consecration: 29 January 1956 by Markos II Khouzam

Personal details
- Born: 28 August 1914 Faiyum, occupied Khedivate of Egypt, British Empire
- Died: 13 August 1995 (aged 80)

Youhanna Nueir (28 August 1914, Faiyum – 13 August 1995) was an Egyptian clergyman and the former suffragan eparch of Asyut. He was ordained in 1943, appointed in 1965, and died in 1995.
