= Cathedral of Our Lady of Egypt =

Coordinates: 30.063704°N 31.340636°E

- كاتدرائية سيدة مصر
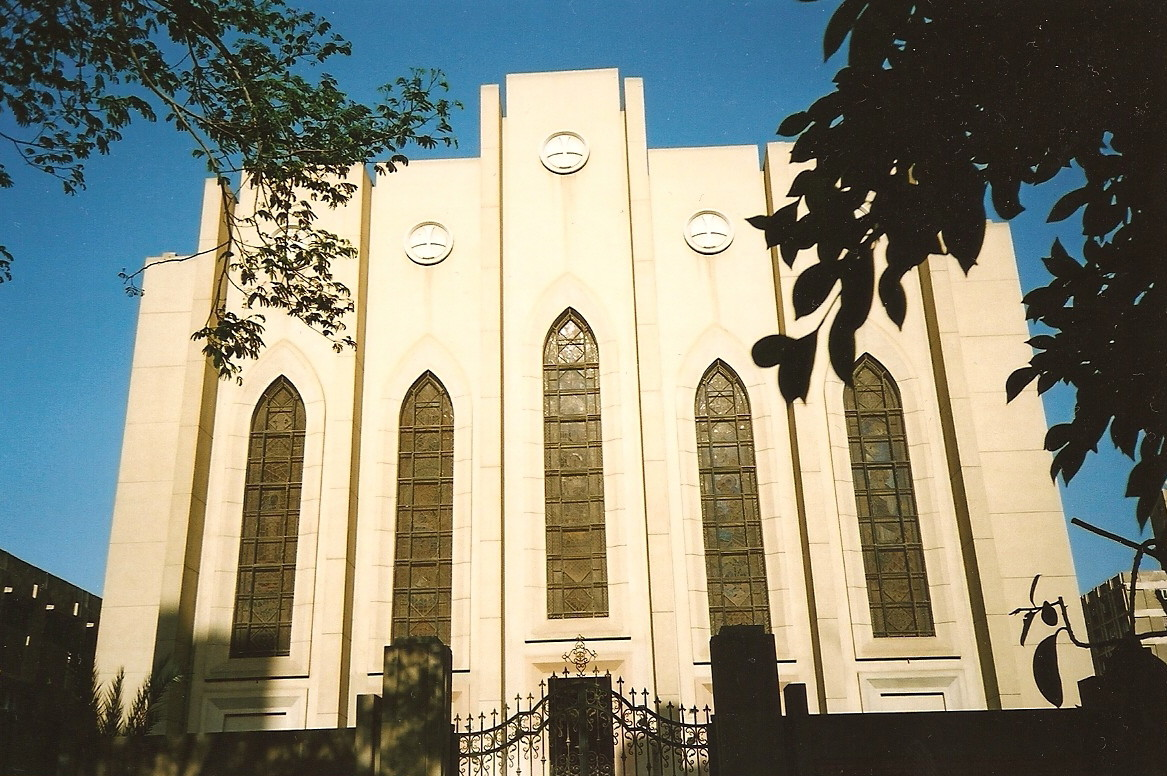
- Façade of the cathedral
- Cathedral of Our Lady of Egypt
- Location: Cairo
- Country: Egypt
- Denomination: Catholic Church (Coptic Catholic Church)

Architecture
- Functional status: Active
- Architectural type: Church

The Cathedral of Our Lady of Egypt, also called the Coptic Catholic Cathedral of Cairo, is a Coptic Catholic church building at 39 Mustafa Fahmi Street in Cairo, Egypt.

The cathedral serves as the main church of the Catholic Coptic Patriarchate of Alexandria (Patriarchatus Alexandrinus Coptorum) which began in 1741 as an apostolic vicariate created by Pope Benedict XIV. It was elevated to its present status in 1895 under the pontificate of Pope Leo XIII with the papal bull “Christi Domini". It is under the pastoral responsibility of Patriarch Ibrahim Isaac Sidrak.

== See also ==
- Catholic Church in Egypt
- Our Lady of Egypt Church
