= Patriarchs of the East =

Religious title in Eastern Christianity

The title of patriarchs of the East is used by primates of several Christian denominations within Eastern Christianity. Historically, the title originated as ecclesiastical designation for primates of the Church of the East. It was, and still is, officially used by different branches of the historical Church of the East.

Besides this, the patriarchate of Antioch has a title of 'Patriarch of Antioch and All The East'. In this context, 'All The East' denotes the Diocese of the East, also called the Diocese of Orients of the Roman Empire, and not in the same perspective of the Church of the East. This title is held by the Melkite, Greek Orthodox, Syriac Orthodox and the Syriac Catholic patriarchs of Antioch, and also by primates of some other sees, belonging to several Eastern Christian denominations.

== Patriarchs of the Church of the East ==
The patriarchs of the Church of the East traditionally also carry the title of catholicos.

- The Catholicos-Patriarch of the Assyrian Church of the East - List (The traditional lineage of the Church of the East).
- The Catholicos-Patriarch of the Ancient Church of the East - List (The schismatic group that splintered from the Assyrian Church of the East in 1964).

== Oriental Orthodox Patriarchs of the East ==
The patriarchs of the East of the Oriental Orthodox churches sometimes also carry the title of catholicos or pope.

The patriarchs of the Oriental Orthodox churches are:

- The Syriac Orthodox Patriarch of Antioch and All the East - List (1), List (2)
- Armenian Apostolic Church
  - The Catholicos of All Armenians, Supreme Patriarch of the Armenian Apostolic Church - List
  - The Catholicos of the Great House of Cilicia, Catholicos Patriarch List
  - The Armenian Patriarch of Constantinople - List
  - The Armenian Patriarchate of Jerusalem - List
- Malankara Orthodox Syrian Church (Orthodox Syrian Church of the East)
  - The Catholicos of the East and Malankara Metropolitan

== Eastern Orthodox Patriarchs of the East ==
The patriarchs of the East of the Eastern Orthodox churches are:

- The Greek Orthodox Patriarch of Antioch and All the East - List (1), List (2)

== Catholic Patriarchs of the East ==
The Catholic Patriarchs of the East are generally speaking the head bishops of some of the autonomous Eastern Catholic Churches. Each patriarch of the east has authority over all bishops of a particular eastern rite church. These patriarchs are elected by their synods, and must extend communion to and receive it from the other patriarchs, including the pope, before officially taking their office. In matters of discipline and practice, but not in matters of dogma, they generally follow the customs and laws of their particular church. Perhaps the most striking example is that in most Eastern Catholic Churches, ordination of married men to the priesthood is routine (although no priest may marry after ordination, and only celibate priests may become bishops). Eastern churches that are not headed by patriarchs are instead headed by bishops who are titled major archbishops, metropolitans, or in a few cases merely eparchs.

The patriarchs of the Eastern Rite Catholic churches are:

- The Coptic Catholic Patriarch of Alexandria - List
- The Syrian Catholic Patriarch of Antioch and all the East - List
- The Melkite Catholic Patriarch of Antioch and all the East, of Alexandria, and of Jerusalem - List
- The Maronite Patriarch of Antioch and all the East - List
- The Chaldean Patriarch of Babylon - List
- The Armenian Catholic Catholicos-Patriarch of Cilicia - List

== See also ==
- Patriarchs

== Sources ==
- Walker, Williston (1985) [1918]. A History of the Christian Church. New York: Scribner. ISBN 9780684184173.
- Wilmshurst, David (2000). The Ecclesiastical Organisation of the Church of the East, 1318–1913. Louvain: Peeters Publishers. ISBN 9789042908765.
- Wilmshurst, David (2011). The martyred Church: A History of the Church of the East. London: East & West Publishing Limited. ISBN 9781907318047.
