= Morkos Hakim =

Coptic Catholic bishop

Morkos Hakim OFM
- Eparch of Sohag
- Native name: مرقص حكيم
- Church: Coptic Catholic Church
- Diocese: Eparchy of Sohag
- In office: 26 May 1982 – 9 August 2003
- Predecessor: Eparchy erected
- Successor: Youssef Aboul-Kheir

Orders
- Ordination: 26 June 1955
- Consecration: 6 June 1982 by Markos II Khouzam

Personal details
- Born: 11 November 1930 Abusir, Kingdom of Egypt
- Died: 11 August 2014 (aged 83)

Markos Hakim OFM (11 November 1930 – 11 August 2014) was a Coptic Catholic eparch.

Ordained to the priesthood in 1955, Hakim was appointed the first eparch of the Coptic Catholic Eparchy of Sohag, Egypt in 1982. In 2003, Hakim resigned.
