= Youhanna Golta =

Egyptian bishop (1937–2022)

Youhanna Kamal Golta (27 January 1937 – 15 February 2022) was an Egyptian Coptic Catholic hierarch.

Born in Cairo, Egypt, Golta was ordained to the priesthood in 1960. He served as auxiliary and curial bishop of the Coptic Catholic Patriarchate of Alexandria, Egypt, from 1986 until his retirement in 2020. Gotta died on 15 February 2022, at the age of 85.
