= Eparchy of Sohag =

Eastern Catholic eparchy in Egypt

Eparchy of Sohag Eparchia Sohagensis

Location
- Territory: Sohag Governorate
- Metropolitan: Alexandria

Statistics
- Population: (as of 2021); 14,320
- Parishes: 24

Information
- Sui iuris church: Coptic Catholic Church
- Rite: Alexandrian Rite
- Established: 13 September 1981
- Cathedral: Cathedral of Christ the King

Current leadership
- Eparch: Thomas Halim Habib
- Bishops emeritus: Youssef Aboul-Kheir

Map
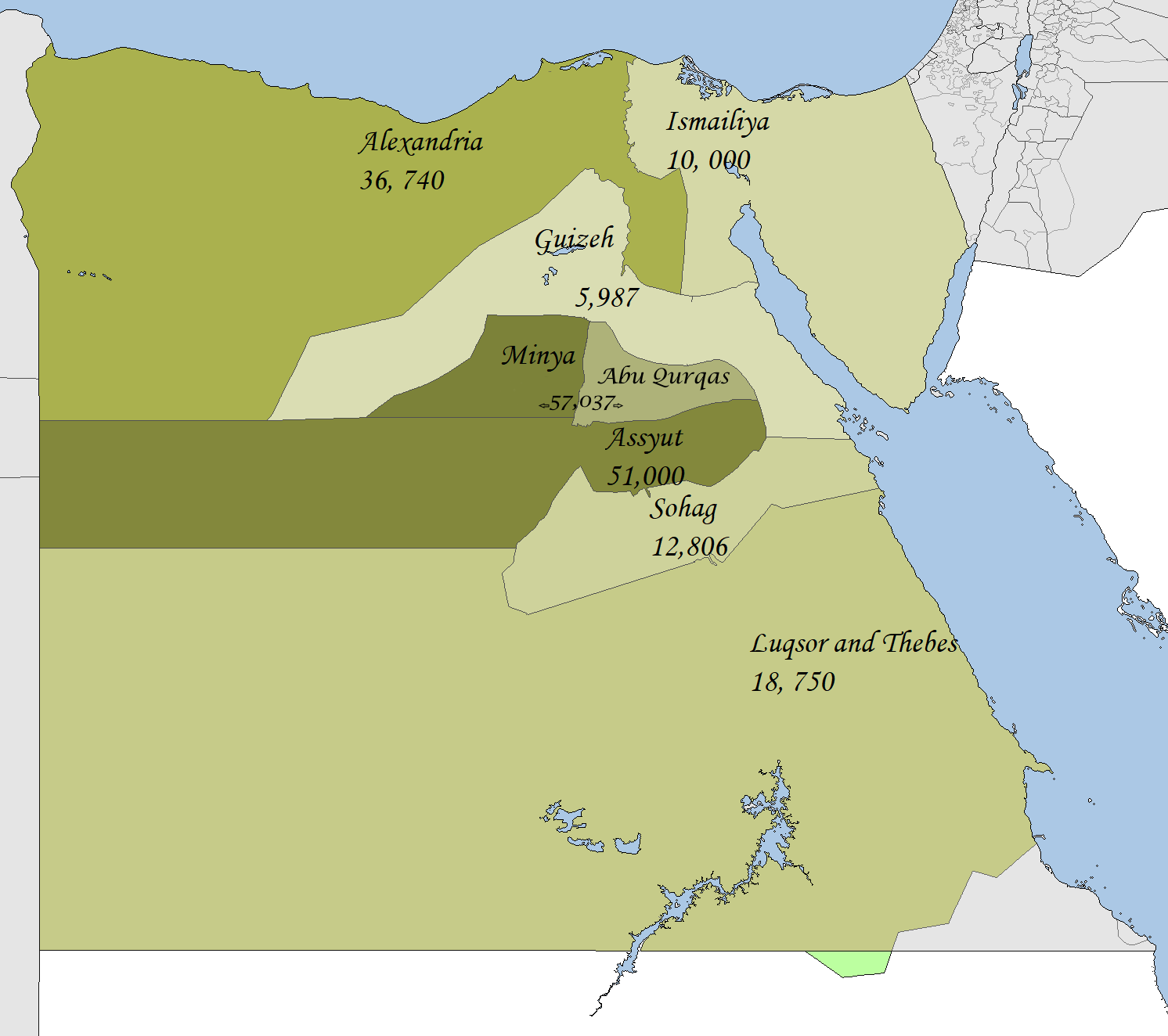

The Eparchy of Sohag is an eparchy of the Coptic Catholic Church, centered in the ecclesiastical province of the Coptic Catholic Patriarch of Alexandria.

== History ==
The Eparchy was erected on 13 September 1981 from the territory of the Eparchy of Luxor.

In 2006, there were 12,670 members across 20 parishes.

== Hierarchs ==
- Bishop Youhanna Nueir, O.F.M. (13 September 1981 – 26 May 1982), patriarchal administrator
- Bishop Morkos Hakim, O.F.M. (26 May 1982 – 9 August 2003)
- Bishop Youssef Aboul-Kheir (9 August 2003 – 14 June 2019)
- Bishop Basilios Fawzy Al-Dabe (14 June 2019 – 3 November 2020)
- Bishop Thomas Halim Habib (since 3 November 2020)
