= Gioda =

Gioda is an Italian surname. Notable people with the surname include:

- Benvenuto Gioda (1886 – 1943), Italian general during World War II
- Leandro Gioda (born 1984), an Argentine footballer

== See also ==
- Giuda
