= Coptic Catholic Patriarchate of Alexandria =

Patriarchate of the Catholic Church in Egypt

Coptic Catholic Patriarch of Alexandria Ⲡⲁⲧⲣⲓⲁⲣⲭⲏⲥ ⲛ̀ⲁⲗⲉⲝⲁⲛⲇⲣⲓⲁ بطريرك الإسكندرية للأقباط الكاثوليك

Catholic
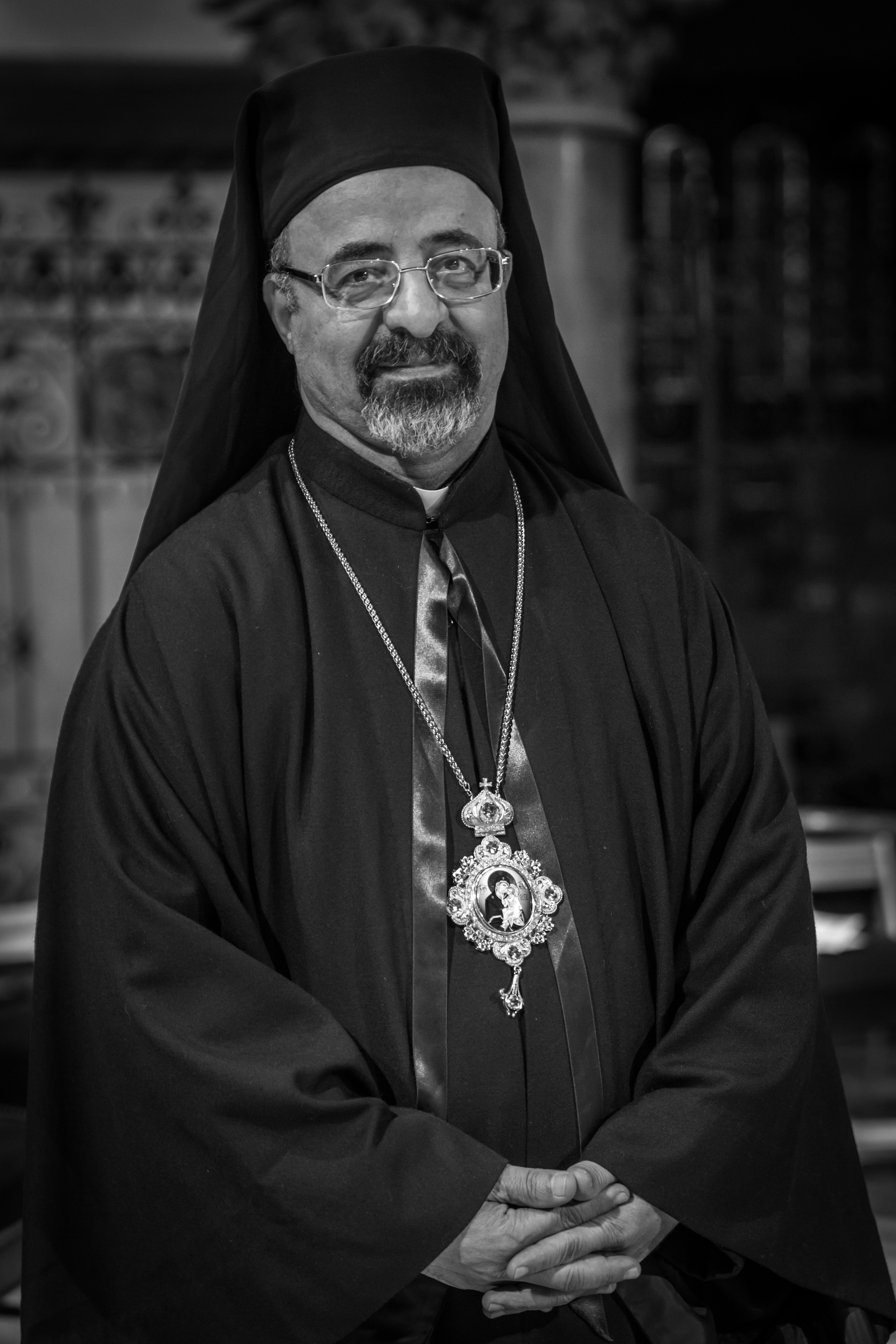
- Sidrak in 2014.
- Incumbent; Ibrahim Isaac Sidrak elected 15 January, 2013

Location
- Country: Egypt
- Headquarters: Cairo, Egypt

Information
- First holder: Mark the Evangelist (As the first bishop of the See of Alexandria); Maximos Jouwed (As the first Coptic Catholic Patriarch of Alexandria)
- Denomination: Catholic
- Sui iuris church: Coptic Catholic Church
- Rite: Coptic rite
- Established: 1824
- Cathedral: Our Lady of Egypt
- Language: Coptic, Arabic

Current leadership
- Pope: Leo XIV
- Patriarch: Ibrahim Isaac Sidrak
- Suffragans: Bechara Guida (Abu Qirqas); Morqos Thomas Esam William (El Quseyya); Daniel Lotfy (Assiut); Pola Ayoub Matta (Ismailia); Basilios Fawzy (Minya); Thomas Halim Habib (Sohag); Emmanuel Bishay (Luxor)
- Auxiliary Bishops: Hani Bakhoum

Website
- catholic-eg.com

The Coptic Catholic Patriarchate of Alexandria is the sole metropolitan see of the Coptic Catholic Church, a sui iuris particular church in full communion with the Holy See of the Catholic Church. It follows the Alexandrian Rite in its own Coptic language. Its archbishop is the superior of all Coptic Catholic dioceses, which are located in and around Egypt.

The patriarchate has two cathedrals, both in Egypt: Our Lady of Egypt in the national capital Cairo, and the Cathedral of the Resurrection in Alexandria.

== History ==
It had three false starts, each failing to prove enduring.

- In 1741 a precursor Catholic Apostolic vicariate was established for Alexandria for Coptic Christians wanting to unite with the Holy See.
- On 15 August 1824 a Patriarchal See of Alexandria / Alexandrin(us) Coptorum (Latin) was established on Egyptian territory, split off from the Apostolic Vicariate of Syria, Egypt, Arabia and Cyprus.
- On 26 November 1895 it was restored as Patriarchal See of Alexandria / Alexandrin(us) Coptorum (Latin), again on Egyptian territory, split off from the Apostolic Vicariate of Egypt.

In 1947 it was restored for good. It lost territories in Egypt repeatedly to establish suffragan sees of Alexandria as Metropolitan:

- on 17 December 1982 the Coptic Catholic Eparchy of Ismayliah
- on 21 March 2003 the Coptic Catholic Eparchy of Guizeh.

It enjoyed Papal visits from Pope John Paul II in February 2000 and from Pope Francis in April 2017.

== Rank ==
The patriarchal see as such ranks third among all Catholic (arch)bishoprics of the world (only after the Apostolic See of Rome and the Catholic Patriarch of Constantinople), by the virtue of Canon Law (CCEO 58, 59.2).

== Proper diocese ==
His proper (arch)eparchy is the Coptic Catholic Eparchy of Alexandria, which has no other Ordinary than the Patriarch. However, he may appoint an Auxiliary bishop for the eparchy, distinct from Auxiliaries for the Patriarchate, as was the case with:

- Youhanna Kabès (7 June 1958 – died 28 June 1985), Titular Bishop of Cleopatris (7 June 1958 – 28 June 1985).

As of 2014, it served 35,865 Eastern Catholics in 31 parishes with 73 priests (41 diocesan, 32 religious), 209 lay religious (65 brothers, 144 sisters) and 5 seminarians.

It enjoyed a Papal visit from Pope Francis in April 2017.

== Apostolic Vicars & Patriarchs ==
=== Coptic Catholic Patriarchs of Alexandria and precursor Apostolic Vicars ===
Coptic Catholic Apostolic Vicars

- Athanasios (1741–1744?)
- Giusto Marsghi (1744?–1748)
- Jakub Římař OFM (1748–1751) (Jacques de Kremsier)
- Paolo d'Angnone (1751–1757)
- Giuseppe de Sassello (1757–1761)
- Roche Abou Kodsi Sabak de Ghirgha (1761–1778); (1781); (1783–1785)
- Gervais d'Ormeal (1778–1781)
- Jean Farargi (1781–1783)
- Bishai Nosser (1785–1787)
- Michelangelo Pacelli de Tricario (1787–1788)
- Mathieu Righet (1788–1822)
- Maximos Jouwed (1822–1831) (also carried the title of Patriarch starting 1824)
- Théodore Abu Karim (1832–1855)
- Athanasios Kyriakos Khouzam (1855–1864)
- Agapios Bishai (1866–1876)
- Antoun di Marco (1876–1887) (visiting apostolic vicar)
  - Antoun Nabad (1887–1889) (provicar)
  - Simon Barraia (1889–1892) (provicar)
  - Antoun Kabes (1892–1895) (provicar)
- Kyrillos Makarios (1895–1899) (apostolic administrator and Patriarchal vicar, Patriarch starting 1899)

Coptic Catholic Patriarchs of Alexandria

Patriarchate established in 1824 (by Pope Leo XII)

* Numbering starts anew after the 24th Patriarch Cyril I, as later patriarchs are not recognized.

No.	Apostolic Throne	Portrait	Patriarchs of Alexandria English • Coptic • Arabic	Notes
25	15 August 1824 – died 30 August 1831		Maximos Jouwed; Maximos • Ⲙⲁⲝⲓⲙⲟⲥ • ماكسيموس	Titular Bishop of Uthina (9 March 1824 – 15 August 1824)
—	1831–1899		Vacant	1. Apostolic Administrator Théodore Abou-Karim - (22 June 1832 – died 28 September 1855), Titular Bishop of Alia (22 June 1832 – 28 September 1855), no other prelature 2. Apostolic Administrator Athanase Khouzan - (2 October 1855 – died 17 February 1864), Titular Bishop of Maronia (2 October 1855 – 17 February 1864), no other prelature.; 3. Apostolic Administrator Abraham Agabio Bsciai - (27 February 1866 – 1878), Titular Bishop of Cariopolis (27 February 1866 – 20 February 1887), no other prelature 4. Apostolic Administrator Cyrillus Macaire/Kyrillos Makarios - (18 March 1895 – 19 June 1899 see below), Titular Bishop of Cæsarea Paneas (15 March 1895 – 19 June 1899).
26	1899–1908		Cyril II Macarius; Cyril • Ⲕⲩⲣⲓⲗⲗⲟⲥ • كيرلس	In 1898, he held the First Alexandria Council for the Catholic Copts heading as vicar. He served as Vicar until 19 June 1899 when he was appointed as Patriarch of Alexandria as the first patriarch of the reinstated Coptic Catholic Patriarchate and was officially ordained as Patriarch in July 1899. He was instrumental in organizing the dioceses and the churches. His successes however prompted much opposition, upon which he tended his resignation from the seat and retreated to Beirut, Lebanon.
—	1908–1947		Vacant	1. Apostolic Administrator (Joseph-)Maxime Sedfaoui - (1908 – 13 January 1925).; 2. Apostolic Administrator Marc Khouzam/Markos Khouzam - (30 December 1927 – 10 August 1947 see below).
27	10 August 1947 – died 2 February 1958		Mark II Khouzam; Mark • Ⲙⲁⲣⲕⲟⲥ • مرقس	He was assigned as locum tenens for the Coptic Catholic Patriarchate in 1927 in succession to another locum tenens Maximos Sedfaoui, who had served before him from 1908 to 1927 in the period when the Patriarchal seat remained vacant (1908-1947) after the resignation of the Coptic Catholic Patriarch Kyrillos Makarios. Khouzam was enthroned on the Patriarchal seat on 10 August 1947 and served as Patriarch for a decade until his death on 2 February 1958. He met with Pope Pius XII.
28	10 May 1958: retired 24 May 1986		Stéphanos I Sidarouss; Stephanos • Ⲥⲧⲉⲫⲁⲛⲟⲥ • اسطفانوس	Served from 1958 to 1986, making his one of the longest patriarchates in that church’s modern history. A member of the Congregation of the Mission (Lazarists), he guided the Coptic Catholic Church through a period of significant change, most notably the Second Vatican Council (1962–1965), in which he participated as a Council Father. In 1965, he was created a cardinal by Pope Paul VI, highlighting his prominent role within the wider Catholic Church. He was one of the cardinal electors who participated in the conclaves of August and October 1978, which selected Popes John Paul I and John Paul II respectively. At the conclusion of both conclaves, Patriarch Sidarouss was one of the few cardinals in the central balcony of St. Peter's Basilica accompanying the new popes when they first made their appearances to the public on August and October respectively. His patriarchate focused on strengthening church institutions, clergy formation, and the integration of conciliar reforms, while maintaining the Coptic identity. He resigned in 1986 and died the following year.
29	23 June 1986 – retired 30 March 2006		Stéphanos II Ghattas; Stephanos • Ⲥⲧⲉⲫⲁⲛⲟⲥ • اسطفانوس	served as Patriarch of Alexandria of the Coptic Catholic Church from 1986 to 2006. A member of the Congregation of the Mission (Lazarists), he continued consolidating the reforms of the Second Vatican Council while emphasizing pastoral care, education, and the strengthening of Coptic Catholic institutions in Egypt. His patriarchate was marked by greater engagement with the universal Catholic Church and ecumenical openness, while preserving the Coptic liturgical and spiritual heritage. In 2001, he was created a cardinal by Pope John Paul II, further highlighting his role on the international Catholic stage. He resigned in 2006 and died in 2009.
30	7 April 2006 – retired 15 January 2013		Antonios I Naguib; Antonious • Ⲁⲛⲧⲱⲛⲓⲟⲥ • انطونيوس	served as Patriarch of Alexandria of the Coptic Catholic Church from 2006 to 2013, he focused on pastoral care, ecumenical dialogue, and strengthening the Coptic Catholic Church’s presence both in Egypt and internationally. In 2006, he was elected patriarch and in 2010, he was created a cardinal by Pope Benedict XVI, reflecting his importance in the global Catholic Church. His patriarchate emphasized education, youth formation, and engagement with modern challenges facing the Church. He resigned in 2013 after attending the conclave of same year. He died in 2022.
31	18 January 2013 – present		Ibrahim I Isaac; Abraham • Ⲁⲃⲣⲁⲁⲙ • ابراهيم	Since his election as Patriarch of Alexandria of the Coptic Catholic Church in January 2013, Ibrahim Isaac Sidrak has led the Coptic Catholic community with a strong focus on pastoral outreach, ecclesial engagement, and strengthening church life in Egypt and beyond. He has been active in liturgical leadership and community events, presiding at divine liturgies and participating in significant church celebrations and conferences, while emphasizing family formation and pastoral formation within the church. He serves as President of the Assembly of Catholic Patriarchs and Bishops in Egypt, engaging in ecumenical cooperation and dialogue with other Christian leaders and institutions. Under his patriarchate, the Coptic Catholic Church has also taken part in international Catholic events and received papal support for its mission, reinforcing its identity within the wider Catholic communion. His leadership continues to address both spiritual life and social challenges, guiding the church through active pastoral ministry and community support.

=== Curial bishops ===
- Youhanna Golta (1997–2020)
- Antonios Aziz Mina (2002–2006), appointed Bishop of Giza
- Botros Fahim Hanna (2006–2013), appointed Bishop of Minya
- Bakhoum Kiroulos (2019–)

== See also ==
- List of Catholic dioceses in Egypt
- List of Coptic Orthodox Popes of Alexandria
- Coptic Orthodox Church of Alexandria
- Patriarchs
- Patriarch of Alexandria
- Latin Patriarch of Alexandria
- Eastern Catholic Churches
- Patriarchs of the east
- Council of Catholic Patriarchs of the East

== Sources and external links ==
- List of all Coptic Patriarchs of Alexandria by GCatholic.org
- GCatholic - Proper Eparchy of Alexandria
