= Basilios Fawzy Al-Dabe =

Egyptian Coptic Catholic bishop (born 1956)

Most Reverend Basilios Fawzy Al-Dabe
- Eparch of Minya
- Church: Coptic Catholic Church
- Province: Alexandria
- Diocese: Minya
- Installed: 3 November 2020
- Predecessor: Ibrahim Isaac Sidrak
- Other post: Patriarchal Administrator of Eparchy of Al Qusia (2022–2023)
- Previous post: Eparch of Sohag (2019–2020)

Orders
- Ordination: 28 March 1980 by Antonios Naguib
- Consecration: 3 August 2019 by Ibrahim Isaac Sidrak

Personal details
- Born: Fawzy Al-Dabe; 16 December 1956 (age 69) Minya, Egypt
- Residence: Minya, Egypt
- Education: Cairo University

Basilios Fawzy Al-Dabe (born 16 December 1956) is an Egyptian Coptic Catholic hierarch. He has served as the Eparch (Bishop) of the Eparchy of Minya since 2020, having previously served as the Eparch of the Eparchy of Sohag from 2019 to 2020.

== Early life and ministry ==
Fawzy Al-Dabe was born on 16 December 1956 in Minya, Egypt. He pursued higher education at Cairo University, graduating with a bachelor's degree in literature in 1978. Following his university studies, he entered the St. Leo Coptic Catholic Seminary in Maadi to study philosophy and theology.

He was ordained to the priesthood on 28 March 1980 by Bishop Antonios Naguib (later Cardinal and Patriarch). Following his ordination, he served in several pastoral roles, including parish priest of the Cathedral of Christ the King in Minya, director of the Catholic schools in the eparchy, and vicar general.

== Episcopal ministry ==
On 14 June 2019, the Synod of Bishops of the Coptic Catholic Church elected him as the Eparch of the Eparchy of Sohag, a choice assented to by Pope Francis. He received his episcopal consecration on 3 August 2019 from Coptic Catholic Patriarch Ibrahim Isaac Sidrak, with other Coptic Catholic bishops serving as co-consecrators.

Following the transfer of Patriarch Ibrahim Isaac Sidrak from the see of Minya, the Synod of Bishops transferred Al-Dabe to the Eparchy of Minya on 3 November 2020. He was officially enthroned in Minya on 13 November 2020.

On 23 September 2022, he was appointed as a Patriarchal Administrator of the newly created Eparchy of Al Qusia, where he served until 25 May 2023.
