= Antonios Naguib =

Catholic cardinal patriarch (1935–2022)

His Beatitude and Eminence Antonios I Naguib أنطونيوس نجيب
- Cardinal Patriarch of Alexandria
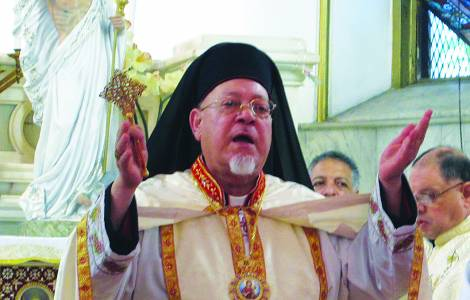
- Church: Coptic Catholic Church
- Archdiocese: Alexandria
- See: Alexandria
- Elected: 30 March 2006
- Term ended: 15 January 2013
- Predecessor: Stéphanos II Ghattas
- Successor: Ibrahim Isaac Sidrak
- Previous posts: Bishop of Minya (1977–2002); Bishop of Alexandria (2006–2013)

Orders
- Ordination: 30 October 1960
- Consecration: 9 September 1977 by Stephanos I Sidarouss
- Created cardinal: 20 November 2010 by Pope Benedict XVI
- Rank: Cardinal-Bishop Patriarch

Personal details
- Born: Antonios Naguib; 18 March 1935 Samalut, Egypt
- Died: 28 March 2022 (aged 87) Cairo, Egypt
- Denomination: Coptic Catholic Church
- Coat of arms

Styles of Antonios Naguib
- Reference style: His Beatitude
- Spoken style: Your Beatitude
- Religious style: His Holiness
- Informal style: Cardinal

Antonios I Naguib (Arabic: أنطونيوس نجيب; 18 March 1935 – 28 March 2022) was the Coptic Catholic Patriarch of Alexandria from 2006 to 2013. He was made a cardinal in 2010. He was bishop of Minya in Egypt from 1977 to 2002.

== Biography ==
Naguib was born in Samalut, Egypt. From 1953 to 1958, he studied at the interritual seminary of Maadi, Cairo, and then at the Pontifical Urbaniana College in Rome. He returned to Egypt and was ordained to the Coptic Catholic priesthood in 1960. After being pastor for a year at Fikryak, Minya, he returned to Rome and obtained licentiates in theology in 1962 and in scripture in 1964. He was Professor of Sacred Scripture at the Maadi seminary from 1964 to 1977. He worked with a group of scholars to prepare a translation of the New Testament into modern standard Arabic.

He became Bishop of Minya in Egypt in 1977, a post he held until he resigned because of poor health in 2002 at the age of 67. On 30 March 2006 he was elected Patriarch of Alexandria of the Copts, after Patriarch Stéphanos II Ghattas retired from that office in March 2006. Pope Benedict XVI acceded to his appointment on 7 April 2006.

In April 2010, Naguib tendered his resignation to the Holy Synod upon reaching the retirement age of 75, but the Holy Synod unanimously refused to accept it and asked him to continue his duties as head of the Coptic Catholic Church.

Pope Benedict named him Relator General (recording secretary) of the October 2010 special assembly of the Synod of Bishops for the Middle East, held at the Vatican.

Naguib was made a cardinal patriarch at the consistory of 20 November 2010; until Maronite Patriarch Bechara Boutros al-Rahi was made a cardinal on 24 November 2012, Naguib was the only incumbent Eastern Catholic Patriarch eligible to vote in a papal conclave. On 29 December 2010, he was named a member of the Congregation for the Oriental Churches and the Pontifical Council for the Pastoral Care of Migrants and Itinerant People.

On 13 October 2011, after attacks by the military against peaceful protesters in Cairo and reported denials of Christian building permits, Naguib urged fraternity among Egyptians of different faiths and expressed his confidence in the country's transitional government.

Naguib suffered a stroke on 31 December 2011. He suffered from partial paralysis and had difficulty speaking. Although Naguib's health improved slowly with the help of physiotherapy, he had to undergo further brain surgery. He resigned as Patriarch on 15 January 2013 and was succeeded by Kyrillos William, Bishop of Assiut.

Naguib was one of the cardinal electors at the 2013 conclave that elected Pope Francis. During the procession and oath taking prior to the doors being shut, Naguib was bareheaded and wore predominantly black vestments proper to the Coptic Catholic Church since he was one of the four cardinal-electors during that conclave who were from outside the Latin Church. The other three cardinal-electors from outside the Latin Church were Maronite Patriarch Bechara Boutros al-Rahi, Syro-Malabar Major Archbishop George Alencherry, and Syro-Malankara Major Archbishop Baselios Cleemis and they too, wore distinct vestments proper to their respective churches.

Naguib died in Cairo following a long illness on 28 March 2022 at the age of 87.

== See also ==
- List of Coptic Catholic Patriarchs of Alexandria

Catholic Church titles
Preceded by Isaac Ghattas	Bishop of Minya; 1977–2002	Succeeded by Ibrahim Isaac Sidrak
Preceded by Stéphanos II Ghattas	Coptic Patriarch of Alexandria; 2006–2013	Succeeded by Ibrahim Isaac Sidrak
