= Coptic Rite =

Alexandrian liturgical rite

Coptic cross

The Coptic Rite is an Alexandrian liturgical rite. It is practiced in the Coptic Orthodox Church and the Coptic Catholic Church.

The term Coptic derives from Arabic qubṭ / qibṭ قبط, a corruption of Greek Aígyptos (Ancient Greek: Αἴγυπτος, "Egyptian").

The Coptic Rite traditionally uses the Coptic language and Greek. Arabic and a number of other modern languages (including English) are also used.

Along with the Geʽez Rite, it belongs to the Alexandrian liturgical tradition.

== History ==
The Coptic Rite originated in the ancient Patriarchate of Alexandria which, in the first centuries of Christianity, was mainly composed of ethnic Greeks. The rite then spread among the indigenous inhabitants of Egypt, amongst whom it has survived to this day.

The Coptic Orthodox Church, being one of the historical successors of the ancient Alexandrian Church, did not accept the decision of the Council of Chalcedon, and, like the rest of the Oriental Orthodox Churches, from the second half of the 5th century, it is in schism with the Eastern Orthodox Church of the Byzantine Rite and with the Catholic Church. Church schism and conflict with Byzantium led to the creation in Egypt of an alternative, ethnically Greek, Chalcedonian See of Alexandria with the Greek Rite. After the Arab conquest of Egypt, the Coptic Church was persecuted. All of the above led to significant changes in the liturgical rite of the Coptic Church.

The oldest Coptic liturgy, the liturgy of Saint Mark, was the main liturgy of the Coptic church until the 8th-9th centuries. The Church of Constantinople actively fought against the liturgy of the Apostle Mark and the Coptic Rite as such, trying to achieve the unification of worship in the East. By the 12th century, in the Coptic churches, everywhere except for the Coptic monasteries, demonstratively ignoring Constantinople, liturgies were close to the ones in Byzantine Rite.

After the formation of the Coptic Catholic Church in 1741, she also began to use the Coptic Rite in worship. Copts-Catholics managed to defend their rite from Latinization in all aspects, with the exception of the monastic tradition, which they have organized according to the Roman Catholic model. In the ancient Coptic Orthodox Church, the historical Coptic monastic tradition is preserved.

== Divine liturgy ==
A characteristic feature of the Coptic Rite is the wide variety of liturgies. The historical liturgy of the Copts, the liturgy of Saint Mark, practically disappeared from use in the 12th century, supplanted by the Byzantine type liturgies. Currently, three liturgies are served in the Coptic Rite:

- Liturgy of Saint Basil. Served on ordinary days. The liturgy contains an anaphora of the Byzantine type, but differs from the liturgy of the same name of the Byzantine Rite.
- Liturgy of Saint Gregory the Theologian. Served on holidays. The anaphora of the liturgy also belongs to the Byzantine type. Composed by St. Gregory Nazianzus
- Liturgy of Saint Cyril. Served during Great and Nativity Lent. The only Coptic liturgy to include an anaphora of the Alexandrian-Roman type. Anaphora reveals similarities with the Roman Canon, the historical order of the Latin Mass. In many ways, this liturgy can be considered the heir to the liturgy of the apostle Mark.

== Canonical hours ==
The cycle of canonical hours is largely monastic, primarily composed of psalm readings. The Coptic equivalent of the Byzantine Horologion is the Agpeya.

Seven canonical hours exist, corresponding largely to the Byzantine order, with an additional "Prayer of the Veil" which is said by bishops, priests, and monks (something like the Byzantine Midnight Office).

The hours are chronologically laid out, each containing a theme corresponding to events in the life of Jesus Christ:

- "Midnight Praise" (said in the early morning before dawn) commemorates the Second Coming of Christ. It consists of three watches, corresponding to the three stages of Christ's prayer in the Garden of Gethsemane ( Matthew 25:1–13 ).
- Prime (dawn) is said upon waking in the morning or after the Midnight Praise the previous night. Associated with the Eternity of God, the Incarnation of Christ, and his Resurrection from the dead.
- Terce (9 a.m.) commemorates Christ's trial before Pilate, the descent of the Holy Spirit at Pentecost.
- Sext (noon) commemorates the Passion of Christ.

Terce and Sext are prayed before each Divine Liturgy.

- None (3 p.m.) commemorates the death of Christ on the Cross. This hour is also read during fasting days.
- Vespers (sunset) commemorates the taking down of Christ from the Cross.
- Compline (9 p.m. – before bedtime) commemorates the burial of Christ, the Final Judgment.

Vespers and Compline are both read before the Liturgy during Lent and the Fast of Nineveh.

- The Veil is reserved for bishops, priests and monks, as an examination of conscience.

Every one of the Hours follows the same basic outline:

- Introduction, which includes the Lord's Prayer
- Prayer of Thanksgiving
- Psalm 50 (LXX).
- Various Psalms
- An excerpt from the Holy Gospel
- Short Litanies
- Some prayers (Only during Prime and Compline)
- Lord Have Mercy is then chanted 41 times (representing the 39 lashes Christ received before the crucifixion, plus one for the spear in His side, plus one for the crown of thorns)
- Prayer of "Holy Holy Holy..." and Lord's Prayer
- Prayer of Absolution
- Prayer of Every Hour

== Sources ==
- Meyendorff, John (1989). Imperial unity and Christian divisions: The Church 450–680 A.D. The Church in history. Vol. 2. Crestwood, NY: St. Vladimir's Seminary Press. ISBN 9780881410563.
- Rev. George William Horner (1902). The service for the consecration of a church and altar according to the Coptic rite; edited with translations from a Coptic and Arabic manuscript of A.D. 1307. London: Harrison and Sons. p. 630. (printers in ordinary to Her Majesty; here printers for the Bishop of Salisbury)
