= Eparchy of Minya =

Eastern Catholic eparchy in Egypt

Coordinates: 28.0833°N 30.7500°E

Eparchy of Minya Eparchia Hermopolitana

Location
- Territory: Minya Governorate

Statistics
- Population: 55,200 (2023)
- Parishes: 30 (2023)

Information
- Sui iuris church: Coptic Catholic Church
- Rite: Alexandrian (Coptic)
- Established: 26 November 1895
- Cathedral: Cathedral of Christ King, Minya

Current leadership
- Eparch: Basilios Fawzy Al-Dabe
- Bishops emeritus: Botros Fahim Hanna

Map
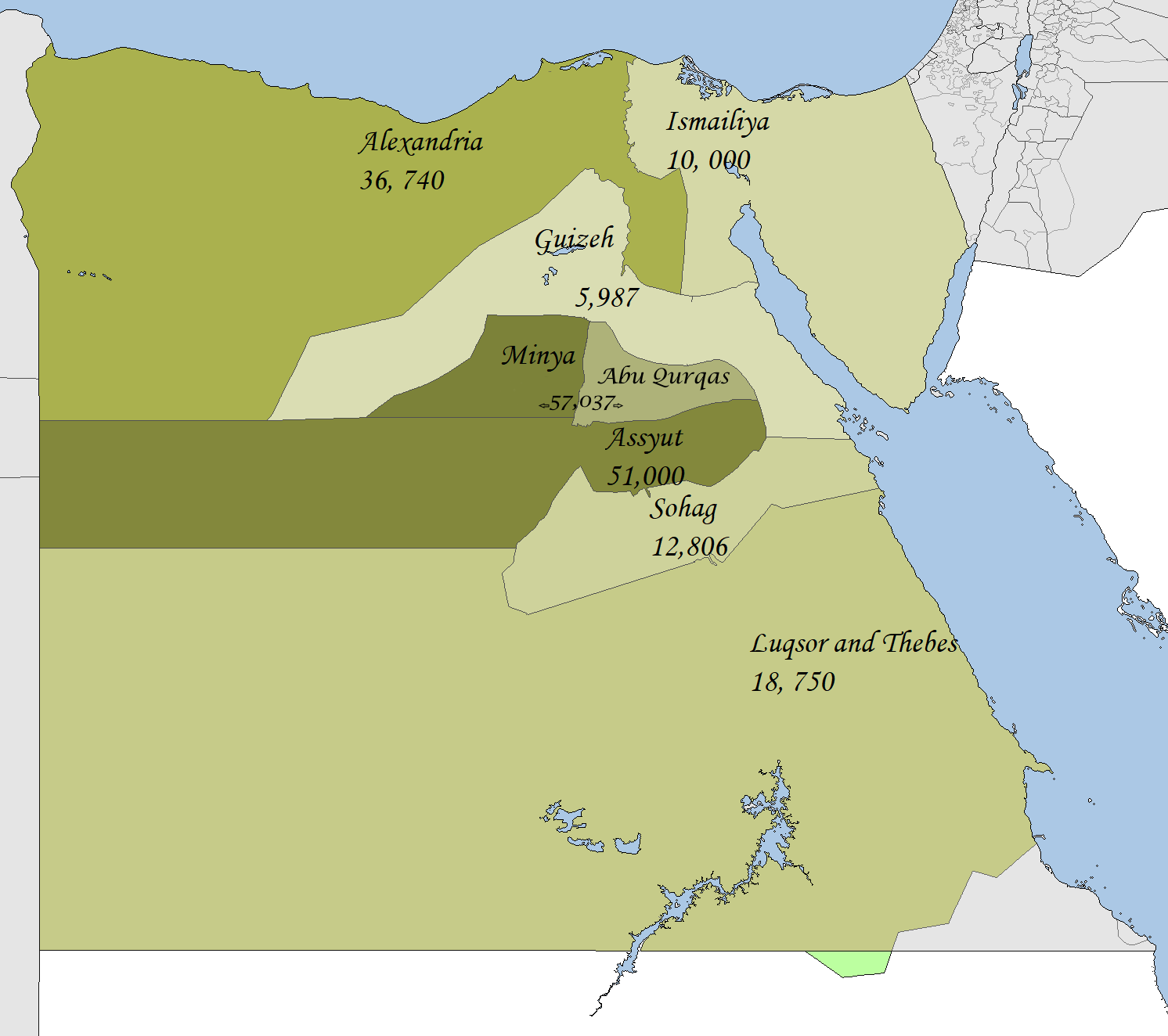

The Coptic Catholic Eparchy of Minya is a suffragan eparchy (Eastern Catholic diocese) of the Coptic Catholic Church (Alexandrian Rite in Coptic language) in its sole ecclesiastical province, that of the Coptic Catholic Patriarch of Alexandria (whose see is in Cairo).

It has its episcopal see the cathedral of Christ King located in Minya, the capital of the Minya Governorate in Upper Egypt.

== History ==
Established on 26 November 1895 as an Eparchy of Minya (Curiate Italian Ermopoli Maggiore), the territory split off from the Apostolic Vicariate of Egypt.

On 7 January 2020 from its territory was carved out the Eparchy of Abu Qurqas, for accommodation a growing population of Coptic Catholic faithful.

== Eparchial Bishops ==
Suffragan Eparchs (Bishops) of Minya

- Joseph-Maxime Sedfaoui (6 March 1896 – 13 January 1925)
- François Baselios Bistauros (10 August 1926 – 30 November 1934)
- Georges Baraka (8 July 1938 – 9 December 1946)
- Paul Nousseir (21 January 1950 – 24 January 1967), archbishop since 1963
- Isaac Ghattas (8 May 1967 – 8 Junuary 1977), archbishop
- Antonios Naguib (26 July 1977 – 29 September 2002)
- Ibrahim Isaac Sidrak (5 October 2002 – 15 January 2013)
- Botros Fahim Hanna (25 March 2013 – 7 October 2020)
- Basilios Fawzy Al-Dabe (since 3 November 2020)

== See also ==
- Catholic Church in Egypt
- Coptic Catholic Church
