= Stéphanos II Ghattas =

Head of the Coptic Catholic Church from 1986 to 2006

His Beatitude and Eminence Stéphanos II Ghattas إسطفانوس الثاني غطاس CM
- Cardinal; Patriarch Emeritus of Alexandria
- Church: Coptic Catholic Church
- Diocese: Alexandria
- See: Alexandria
- Appointed: 8 June 1986
- Term ended: 27 March 2006
- Predecessor: Stéphanos I Sidarouss
- Successor: Antonios I Naguib
- Previous posts: Bishop of Luxor (1967–1986); Bishop of Alexandria (1986–2006)

Orders
- Ordination: 25 March 1944
- Consecration: 9 June 1967 by Stéphanos I Sidarouss
- Created cardinal: 21 February 2001 by Pope John Paul II
- Rank: Cardinal-Bishop Patriarch

Personal details
- Born: Andraos Ghattas; 16 January 1920 Cheikh Zein-el-Dine, Girga Governorate, Egypt
- Died: 20 January 2009 (aged 89) Cairo, Egypt
- Buried: Cathedral of Our Lady of Egypt, Cairo
- Denomination: Coptic Catholic Church
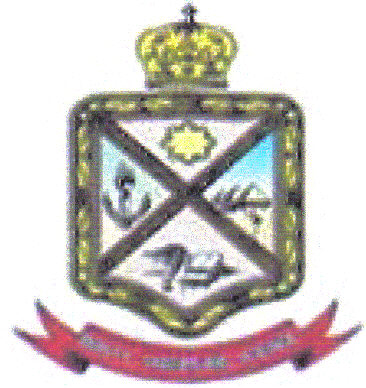
- Coat of arms

Styles of Stéphanos II Ghattas
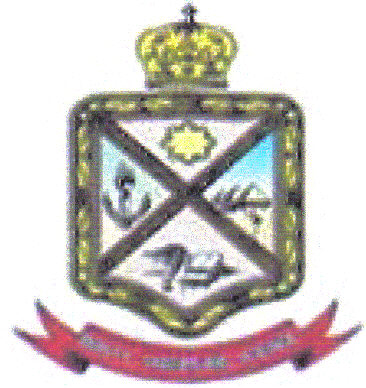
- Reference style: His Beatitude
- Spoken style: Your Beatitude
- Religious style: His Holiness
- Informal style: Cardinal

Stéphanos II Ghattas CM (Arabic: إسطفانوس الثاني غطاس) (16 January 1920 – 20 January 2009) was an Egyptian Catholic prelate who served as the Coptic Catholic Patriarch of Alexandria from 1986 to 2006. He was a member of the Congregation of the Mission and was made a cardinal in 2001. His cause for beatification will be initiated by Ibrahim Isaac Sidrak as soon as possible.

== Biography ==
Ghattas was born Andraos Ghattas in the village of Cheikh Zein-el-Dine in the Girga Governorate (now part of the Sohag Governorate), Egypt. Feeling called to serve as a priest, as a teenager he entered the minor seminary of the Coptic Church in Cairo, then did studies at a Jesuit secondary school in the city. He then went to Rome, where he studied at the Pontifical Urbaniana University, earning doctorates in both theology and philosophy. He was ordained there on 25 March 1944. He then returned to Egypt where he taught at Coptic seminaries in the country, first at Tahta, then at Tanta.

In 1952 Ghattas entered the Congregation of the Mission, doing his year of novitiate in France. He then served in the Lebanon for six years, after which he was sent to Alexandria, where he was the Superior of the Vincentians in Egypt. He was chosen to be the Coptic Bishop of Luxor on 8 May 1967 and consecrated on 9 June 1967 in Alexandria by Cardinal Stéphanos I Sidarouss, Coptic Patriarch of Alexandria. He was elected patriarch himself on 8 June 1986. Pope John Paul II granted him the ecclesiastica communio on 23 June 1986.

Pope John Paul II named him a cardinal of the Catholic Church in 2001. As he was past the legal age of 80 at the time, however, he was unable to participate in the Conclave of 2005.

Ghattas retired from the patriarchal office in March 2006, and his successor, Antonios Naguib, was elected on 30 March 2006.

Ghattas died in Cairo, where he had retired, on 20 January 2009, four days after his 89th birthday, and was buried in the Cathedral of Our Lady of Egypt in Cairo.

== See also ==
- List of Coptic Catholic Patriarchs of Alexandria

== Notes ==
Catholic Church titles
Preceded by Isaac Ghattas	Bishop of Luxor; 1967-1986	Succeeded by Aghnatios Elias Yaacoub, S.J.
Preceded by Stéphanos I Sidarouss	Coptic Patriarch of Alexandria; 1986–2006	Succeeded by Antonios I Naguib
