= El Quseyya =

El Quseyya ⲕⲱⲥ
- City
- القوصية
- Location in Egypt
- Coordinates: 27.414291°N 30.8216°E
- Country: Egypt
- Governorate: Asyut

Area
  - Total: 12.6 km^{2} (4.9 sq mi)
- Elevation: 54 m (177 ft)

Population (2023)
  - Total: 105,891
  - Density: 8,400/km^{2} (21,800/sq mi)
- Time zone: UTC+2 (EET)
  - Summer (DST): UTC+3 (EEST)

El Quseyya (Arabic: القوصية, Coptic: ⲕⲱⲥ Kos) is a city in Egypt. In ancient times it was known as Cusae or Qesy. The city is in Asyut Governorate.
