= Alexandrian liturgical rites =

Liturgical rites used by Coptic and Orthodox Tewahedo Church

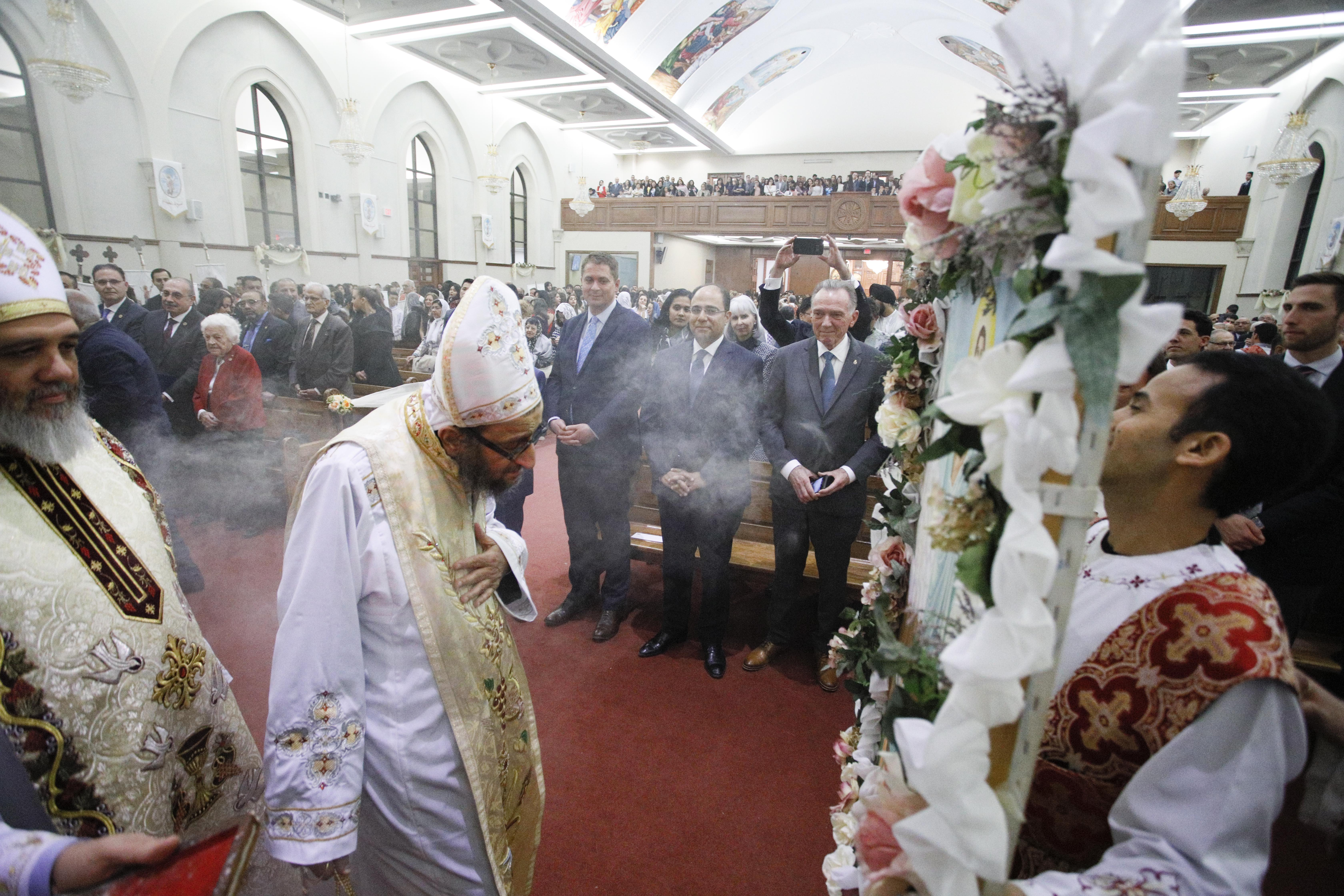
A procession celebrating the Resurrection of Christ during a Coptic Pascal liturgy (Easter).

The Alexandrian rites are a collection of ritual families and uses of Christian liturgy employed by three Oriental Orthodox churches (the Coptic Orthodox Church, the Eritrean Orthodox Tewahedo Church, and the Ethiopian Orthodox Tewahedo Church), and by three Eastern Catholic Churches (the Coptic Catholic Church, the Eritrean Catholic Church, and the Ethiopian Catholic Church).

The Alexandrian rite's Divine Liturgy contains elements from the liturgies of Saints Mark the Evangelist (who is traditionally regarded as the first bishop of Alexandria), Basil the Great, Cyril of Alexandria, and Gregory of Nazianzus. The Alexandrian rites are sub-grouped into two rites: the Coptic Rite and the Ge'ez Rite.

== Sub-groups ==
=== Coptic ===
The Coptic Rite is native to Egypt and traditionally uses the Coptic language with a few phrases in Greek. It is used in the Coptic Orthodox Church and the Coptic Catholic Church. Arabic and a number of other modern languages (including English) are also used.

=== Ge'ez ===
The Ge'ez Rite is native to Ethiopia and Eritrea and uses the Ge'ez language. It is used in the Ethiopian Orthodox Tewahedo and Eritrean Orthodox Tewahedo churches, and the Ethiopian and Eritrean Catholic Churches.

== Divine Liturgy ==
The main Eucharistic liturgy used by the Coptic Churches is known as the Liturgy of Saint Basil. The term Liturgies of Saint Basil in a Coptic context means not only the sole anaphora with or without the related prayers, but also the general order of the Divine Liturgy in this rite. The term Liturgy of Saint Basil may refer also to the whole Eucharistic Liturgy which in the Coptic Churches has the following structure:

The Liturgy of St Cyril in the Coptic language is the Liturgy of Saint Mark that has been translated from Koine Greek.

=== Offertory ===
Offertory (or Prothesis) is the part of the liturgy in which the Sacramental bread (قربان qurbān) and wine (أبركه abarkah) are chosen and placed on the altar. All these rites are medieval developments.

It begins with the dressing of the priest with vestments and the preparation of the altar, along with prayers of worthiness for the celebrant. At this point is chanted the appropriate hour of the Canonical hours, followed by the washing of the hands with its prayer of worthiness, and by the proclamation of the Nicene Creed.

Then takes place the elaborate rite of the choosing of the Lamb: while the congregation sing 41 times the Kyrie eleison, the priest checks the wine and chooses among the bread one loaf which will be consecrated (the Lamb). The Lamb is cleaned with a napkin and blessed with the priest's thumb wet of wine. Afterwards the priest takes the Lamb in procession around the altar and the deacon follows with the wine and a candle. At the altar, the priest, with appropriate prayers, blesses the Lamb and the wine, places the Lamb on the Paten and pours wine and a few drops of water in the chalice (the chalice is stowed into a wooden box named ark on the altar).

The last part of the offertory resembles an anaphora: after a dialogue, the priest blesses the congregation and proclaims a prayer of thanksgiving, giving thanks to God for his support to humanity, and asking him for a worthy participation to the liturgy. Then comes the prayer of covering, said inaudibly by the priest, which has the form of an epiclesis, asking God to show his face on the gifts, and to change them in order that the bread and wine may became the Body and Blood of Christ. This text might come from an ancient anaphora or simply be a later High Middle Ages creation. The paten and the ark with inside the chalice are here covered with a veil.

=== Liturgy of the Catechumens ===
In the Liturgy of the Catechumens the readings from the New Testament are proclaimed. This portion of the Divine Liturgy was in the ancient times the beginning of the liturgy, and the only part which could be attended by the catechumens. This part is roughly equivalent to the Liturgy of the Word in the Western rites

It begins with a Penitential Rite in which first the priest prays inaudibly Christ for the forgiveness of sins (The Absolution to the Son) and then all the participants kneel in front of the altar and the celebrant, or the bishop if present, recites a prayer of absolution (The Absolution to the Ministers).

The reading from the Pauline epistles is preceded by the offering of incense at the four sides of the altar, at the iconostasis, at the book of the Gospel and at the faithful in the nave; in the meantime the faithful sing a hymn to Mary and a hymn of intercession. The Pauline epistle is followed by a reading from the Catholic epistles, and by one from the Acts of the Apostles. Another offering of incense is conducted (the Praxis Incense), similar to the Pauline incense except that only the first row of the faithful is incensed. A reading from the Coptic Synaxarium can follow.

After these readings, the Trisagion is sung three times, each time with a different reference to the Incarnation, Passion, Resurrection, thus addressing the Trisagion to Christ only. After the Trisagion follows a litany, the recital of a Psalm and the singing of the Alleluia, and finally the proclamation of the Gospel from the doors of the sanctuary. The sermon may follow.

=== Liturgy of the Faithful ===
The Liturgy of the Faithful is the core of the Divine Liturgy, where are placed the proper Eucharistic rites.

It begins with the prayer of the Veil, in which the priest offers the liturgical sacrifice to God. The Long Litanies follows, where all pray for the peace, for the ecclesiastic hierarchy and for the congregation. The Nicean Creed is proclaimed, the priest washes his hands three times and sprinkles water on the congregation reciting the Prayer of Reconciliation which is a prayer of worthiness for all who attend the liturgy. Next is the Kiss of peace during which the faithful sing the Aspasmos Adam hymn, according to the season of the liturgical calendar.

==== Anaphora ====
The Anaphora is conducted.

The Coptic anaphora of Saint Basil, even if related and using the same Antiochene (or "West Syrian") structure, represents a different group from the Byzantine, West Syrian and Armenian grouping of anaphoras of Saint Basil. The Coptic version does not derive directly from the latter and has its own peculiarities: its text is more brief, with less Scriptural and allusive enhancements, and it lacks well defined Trinitarian references, which are typical of other versions and reflect the theology of the First Council of Constantinople of 381.

The structure of the Bohairic Coptic version used today in the Coptic Churches can be summarized as follow:

- Anaphora:
  - the Opening Dialogue
  - the Preface, praising Father as Lord and everlasting king, as creator of heaven and earth, the sea and all that is in them (quoting Psalm 146:6), and as Father of Christ by whom all things were made.
  - the Pre-Sanctus, praising the Father on his throne of glory and worshiped by the Angelic hosts, so introducing –
  - the Sanctus, conducted without the Benedictus,
  - the Post-Sanctus, recalling the whole history of Salvation, from the Original Sin to the Incarnation, Passion, Resurrection of Christ up to the Last Judgment,
  - the Institution narrative,
  - the Anamnesis, referring to the Passion, Resurrection and Second Coming of Christ,
  - the Oblation, offering to the Father the Eucharistic gifts,
  - the Epiclesis, asking the Holy Spirit to come and to sanctify and manifest the gifts as the Most Holy. The Holy Spirit is then asked to make the bread the Body and the chalice the Blood of Christ,
  - the Intercessions, praying for the participants to become one single body, for the Church, for the Pope of Alexandria and for all the ecclesiastic hierarchy, for the town and the harvest, for the floodings, for the living, for who have offered the Eucharistic gifts, for the saints - naming Mary, John the Baptist, Saint Stephen, Saint Mark and Saint Basil. Then the diptychs are read, followed by the prayers for the dead,
  - a prayer for the fruit of the Communion and the final doxology.

The 7th-century Sahidic Coptic version found in 1960 shows an earlier and more sober form of the Bohairic text: the manuscript, incomplete in its first part, begins with the Post Sanctus, and is followed by a terse Institution narrative, by a pithy Anamnesis which simply lists the themes and ends with the oblation. The next Epiclesis consists only of the prayer to the Holy Spirit to come and manifest the gifts, without any explicit request to change the gifts in the Body and Blood of Christ. The intercessions are shorter and only Mary is named among the saints.

==== After the Anaphora ====
After the anaphora takes place the consignation, i.e. the moistening of the Lamb with some drops of the consecrated Wine, which is show to the worship of the faithful. The Fraction of the consecrated Lamb ensues, during which the priest says a prayer which varies according to the Coptic calendar. All of the congregation stands and prays with open hands the Lord's Prayer.

To be prepared for partaking of the Eucharist, the faithful bow while the celebrant says in low voice the prayer of submission, then the priest and the participants offer each other a wish of peace and the priest inaudibly prays the Father for the forgiveness of sins (The Absolution to the Father).

The Elevation is similar to that in the Byzantine Rite, with the celebrant who raises the portion of the Lamb engraved with a cross (the ispadikon) crying: "The holy things for the holy ones". The priest makes a second consignation and puts gently the ispakidon in the chalice (the commixture), then he recites aloud a Confession of faith. The partaking of the Eucharist follows, first the Body of Christ given to the celebrants, to the deacons and to the faithful who approach the sanctuary without shoes and then the Blood of Christ in the same order. Psalm 150 is sung in the meantime. The distribution of the Eucharist ends with a blessing with the Paten.

The dismissal rites include The Prayer of Laying the Hands and the final blessing.

==== Ethiopian Anaphoras ====
- Anaphora of the Apostles
- Anaphora of Our Lord Jesus Christ
- Anaphora of St. John the Evangelist
- Anaphora of the 318 Orthodox Fathers of the Council of Nicaea
- Anaphora of Our Lady Mary by Kyriakos of Behnsa
- Anaphora of St. Athanasius
- Anaphora of St. Basil
- Anaphora of St. Gregory of Nyssa
- Anaphora of St. Epiphanius
- Anaphora of St. John Chrysostom
- Anaphora of St. Cyril
- Anaphora of St. James of Sarug
- Anaphora of St. Gregory
- Anaphora of St. Dioscorus

== Bibliography ==
- Rev. George William Horner (1902). The service for the consecration of a church and altar according to the Coptic rite; edited with translations from a Coptic and Arabic manuscript of A.D. 1307. London: Harrison and Sons. p. 630. (printers in ordinary to Her Majesty; here printers for the Bishop of Salisbury)
