= Coptic Catholic Church =

Eastern Catholic church

- ϯⲉⲕⲕⲗⲏⲥⲓⲁ ⲛ̀ⲣⲉⲙⲛ̀ⲭⲏⲙⲓ ⲛ̀ⲕⲁⲑⲟⲗⲓⲕⲏ (Coptic) الكنيسة القبطية الكاثوليكية (Arabic)
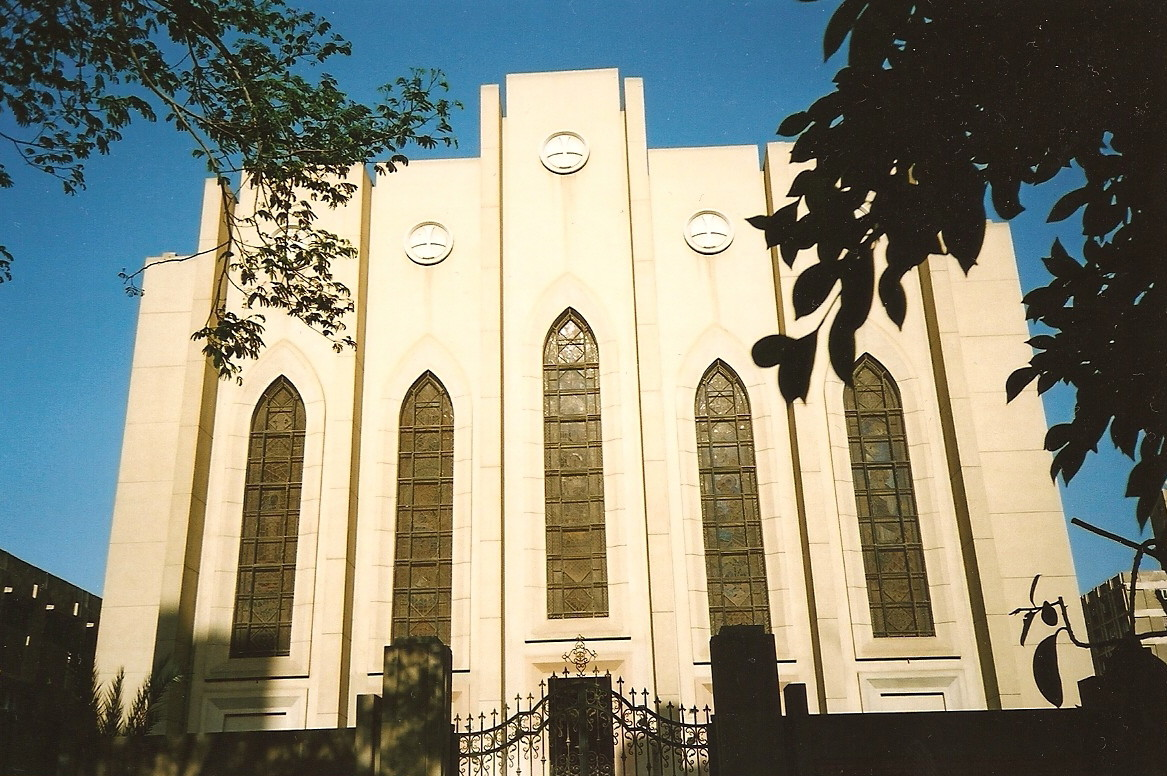
- Cathedral of Our Lady of Egypt, Cairo, Egypt
- Classification: Catholic
- Orientation: Eastern Catholic
- Theology: Catholic Theology
- Polity: Episcopal
- Structure: Patriarchate
- Pope: Leo XIV
- Patriarch: Ibrahim Isaac Sidrak
- Eparchies: 9
- Associations: Dicastery for the Eastern Churches
- Region: Egypt, with communities in Asia, Australia, Europe, and North America
- Language: Coptic, Arabic
- Liturgy: Coptic Rite
- Headquarters: Cathedral of Our Lady of Egypt, Cairo, Egypt
- Founder: Mark the Evangelist (according to tradition)
- Congregations: 166 (2016)
- Members: 253,100 (2023)
- Ministers: 243
- Other name: Coptic Church
- Official website: catholic-eg.com

The Coptic Catholic Church, (Note: Arabic: الكنيسة القبطية الكاثوليكية; Latin: Ecclesia Catholica Coptorum, (Coptic: ϯⲉⲕⲕⲗⲏⲥⲓⲁ ⲛ̀ⲣⲉⲙⲛ̀ⲭⲏⲙⲓ ⲛ̀ⲕⲁⲑⲟⲗⲓⲕⲏ, romanized: Ti-eklisia en-remenkimi en-katholikos, lit. 'the Egyptian Catholic Church')) also known as the Coptic Catholic Church of Alexandria, is an Eastern Catholic particular church in full communion with the Catholic Church. Along with the Ethiopian Catholic Church and Eritrean Catholic Church, it belongs to the Alexandrian liturgical tradition. Uniquely among the Alexandrian Rite Eastern Catholic liturgies, the Coptic Catholic Church uses the Coptic Rite and the Coptic language (derived from Ancient Egyptian) in its liturgy; the Ethiopian Catholic Church and Eritrean Catholic Church use the Geʽez Rite.

The current Coptic Catholic Patriarch of Alexandria is Ibrahim Isaac Sidrak, who replaced Antonios Naguib in 2013. The offices of the patriarchate are located in Cairo. The patriarchal Cathedral of Our Lady of Egypt is in Nasr City, a suburb of Cairo.

== History ==
=== Beginnings ===
Since the Council of Chalcedon in the 5th century and the official separation of the Coptic Church from the Western Christian and Eastern Orthodox churches, the Catholic Church has attempted to achieve reunion with the Copts in Egypt many times. During the Council of Florence in 1442, the Coptic delegates present agreed to a reunion with the papacy in Rome, but the Coptic populace was opposed to the idea, and the union did not take effect. Further failed attempts at reunion were undertaken by Coptic delegates in 1560 and 1582.

In the 17th century, at the behest of Pope Urban VIII, Catholic missionaries (primarily Franciscans) started to come to Egypt. In 1630, a number of missions of the Capuchin Order were founded in the Levant by Joseph of Paris, including in Cairo. Although the mission in Cairo initially faced setbacks, tensions with the local Coptic priesthood were eased following the arrival of the Capuchin priest Agathangelo of Vendôme in 1633.

Initial relations between Catholics and Copts in Egypt were poor. One Coptic councilor in 1637 referred to the Roman Church in Egypt as "a brothel". Attempts to excommunicate Catholic offenders in the city were seemingly fruitless. Agathangelo would later be hanged as a martyr in Ethiopia by order of the Ethiopian king in 1638, and the mission in Cairo would start to decline.

The Jesuits came in 1675.

In 1741, the Coptic bishop, Anba Athanasius of Jerusalem, became a Catholic. In 1781, he was appointed by Pope Benedict XIV as vicar apostolic of the fewer than 2,000 Egyptian Coptic Catholics. Eventually, Athanasius returned to the Coptic Orthodox Church and others served as Catholic vicar apostolic.

=== Patriarchate ===
Under the assumption that the Ottoman viceroy Muhammad Ali Pasha wanted a Catholic patriarch for the Coptic Catholics in 1824, the Pope established the Patriarchate of Alexandria from the Apostolic Vicariate of Syria, Egypt, Arabia and Cyprus, but it was basically titular. The Ottomans in 1829 allowed the Coptic Catholics to build their own churches.

Pope Gregory XVI appointed Theodore Abukarim as "Apostolic Delegate and Visitor to the Abyssinian people" (i.e. the Coptic Catholics in Egypt) in 1840.

The number of Catholics of this rite increased to the point that Pope Leo XIII in 1895 restored the Catholic patriarchate. He initially named Bishop Cyril Makarios as patriarchal vicar. Makarios then presided over a synod, which led to the introduction of some Latin practices. In 1899, Leo appointed Makarios as patriarch of Alexandria of the Copts, taking the name Cyril II. He resigned in 1908 at the request of Pope Pius X over a controversy. The patriarchal see remained vacant until an election in 1947 and was governed by an apostolic administrator.

== Current organisation ==
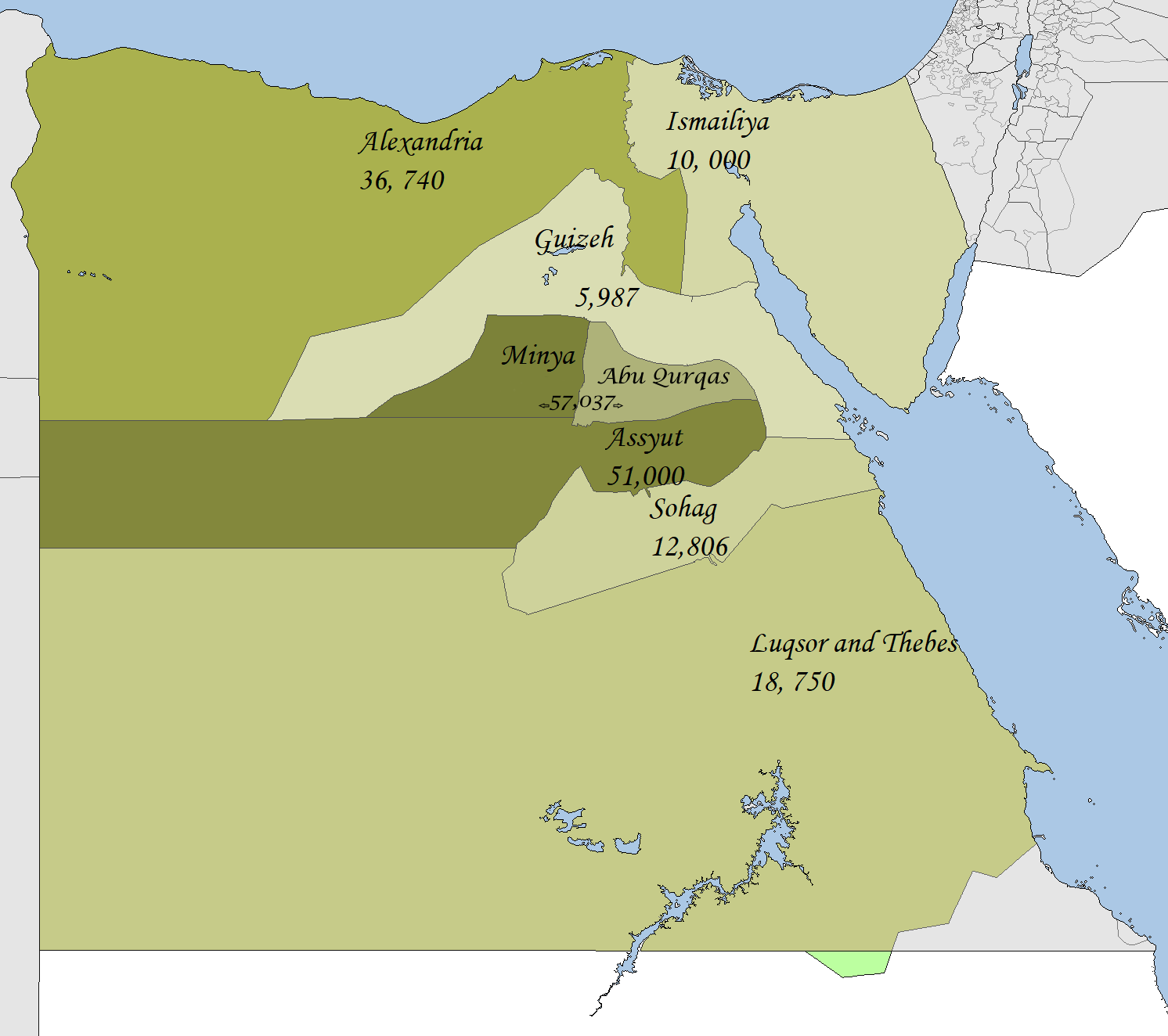
A map of the jurisdictions of the Coptic Catholic Church (without the Eparchy of Al Qusia, created in 2022)

The Coptic Catholic Church sui juris comprises a single ecclesiastical province, covering Egypt alone. The patriarch is the sole metropolitan archbishop, retaining the ancient title Alexandria, although his actual seat is in Egypt's modern capital Cairo.

The Coptic Catholic Church has eight suffragan bishops, throughout Egypt, comprising the only Coptic Catholic ecclesiastical province:

- Coptic Catholic Patriarchate of Alexandria and its Egyptian suffragans :
  - Coptic Catholic Eparchy of Alexandria (Patriarch's proper eparchy, erected on 15 August 1824, recreated on 26 November 1895)
  - Eparchy of Luxor or Thebes (created on 26 November 1895 from the Patriarchal See)
  - Eparchy of Minya or Hermopolis (created on 26 November 1895 from the Patriarchal See)
  - Eparchy of Asyut (created on 10 October 1947 from Eparchy of Luxor)
  - Eparchy of Sohag (created on 13 September 1981 from Eparchy of Luxor)
  - Eparchy of Ismaylia (created on 12 December 1982 from the Patriarchal See)
  - Eparchy of Giza (created on 21 March 2003 from the Patriarchal See)
  - Eparchy of Abu Qurqas (created on 7 January 2020 from Eparchy of Minya)
  - Eparchy of Al Qusia (created on 22 September 2022 from Eparchy of Asyut)

=== Hierarchy ===
The present Coptic Catholic episcopate (14 hierarchs as per 25 May 2023) is as follows:

Patriarch:

- Ibrahim Isaac Sidrak, Patriarch of Alexandria (since 2013)

Eparchial Bishops:

- Emmanuel Bishay, Bishop of Luxor, Apostolic Visitor in Europe (since 2016)
- Toma Adly Zaki, Bishop of Giza (since 2019)
- Basilios Fawzy Al-Dabe, Bishop of Minya (since 2020)
- Bechara Giuda, OFM, Bishop of Abu Qurqas (since 2020)
- Thomas Halim Habib, Bishop of Sohag, Apostolic Visitator in Oceania and the Gulf Countries (since 2021)
- Daniel Lotfy Khella, Bishop of Asyut (since 2022)
- Pola Akhnoukh, Bishop of Ismaylia, Apostolic Visitator in the United States and Canada (since 2023)
- Morqos Faragalla, Bishop of Al Qusia (since 2023)

Curial Bishop:

- Bakhoum Kiroulos, Titular Bishop of Cabasa, Curial of Alexandria (since 2019)

Emeritus Hierarchs:

- Makarios Tewfik, Bishop Emeritus of Ismaylia (since 2019)
- Antonios Aziz Mina, Bishop Emeritus of Giza (since 2017)
- Youssef Aboul-Kheir, Bishop Emeritus of Sohag (since 2019)
- Botros Fahim Hanna, Bishop Emeritus of Minya (since 2020)

=== Religious orders ===
The Coptic Catholic Church does not have any monasteries like the Coptic Orthodox Church, but there are several religious congregations: an Egyptian Franciscan province, and three communities of religious sisters, the Society of the Sacred Heart (actually known as the "Sisters of the Sacred Heart"), the Coptic Sisters of Jesus and Mary (both based in Egypt) and the Egyptian province of the Little Sisters of Jesus. A congregation of the Little Sisters of Jesus has been in Egypt since 1954.

=== Clergy ===
Most candidates for the priesthood are trained at St. Leo's Patriarchal Seminary, in suburban Cairo.

=== Educational and health services ===
More than 100 Coptic Catholic parishes administer primary schools, and some have secondary schools as well. The church maintains a hospital, a number of medical dispensaries and clinics, and several orphanages.

== Ecumenical relations ==
Relations between the Coptic Catholic Church and the larger Coptic Orthodox Church are generally very good.

== See also ==
- Eastern Catholicism
- List of Catholic dioceses in Egypt
- List of Catholic dioceses (structured view)
- List of Coptic Catholic Patriarchs of Alexandria
- Monasticism
- Oriental Orthodox Church

== Sources and external links ==
- Coptic Catholic Patriarchate official website
- Coptic Catholic Church page at Fellowship and Aid to the Christians of the East
- Article on "Life in a Coptic Catholic Village"
- "Italian-language video on the Coptic Catholic Church"
- "Video of the ordination of Coptic Catholic deacons"
- Article on the Coptic Catholic Church by Ronald Roberson on the CNEWA web site
- Common Declaration of Pope Paul VI and Pope Alexandria Shenouda III, 1973
- GigaCatholic
