= Ibrahim Isaac Sidrak =

Head of the Coptic Catholic Church

His Beatitude Ibrahim Isaac Sidrak إبراهيم إسحاق سدراك
- Patriarch of Alexandria
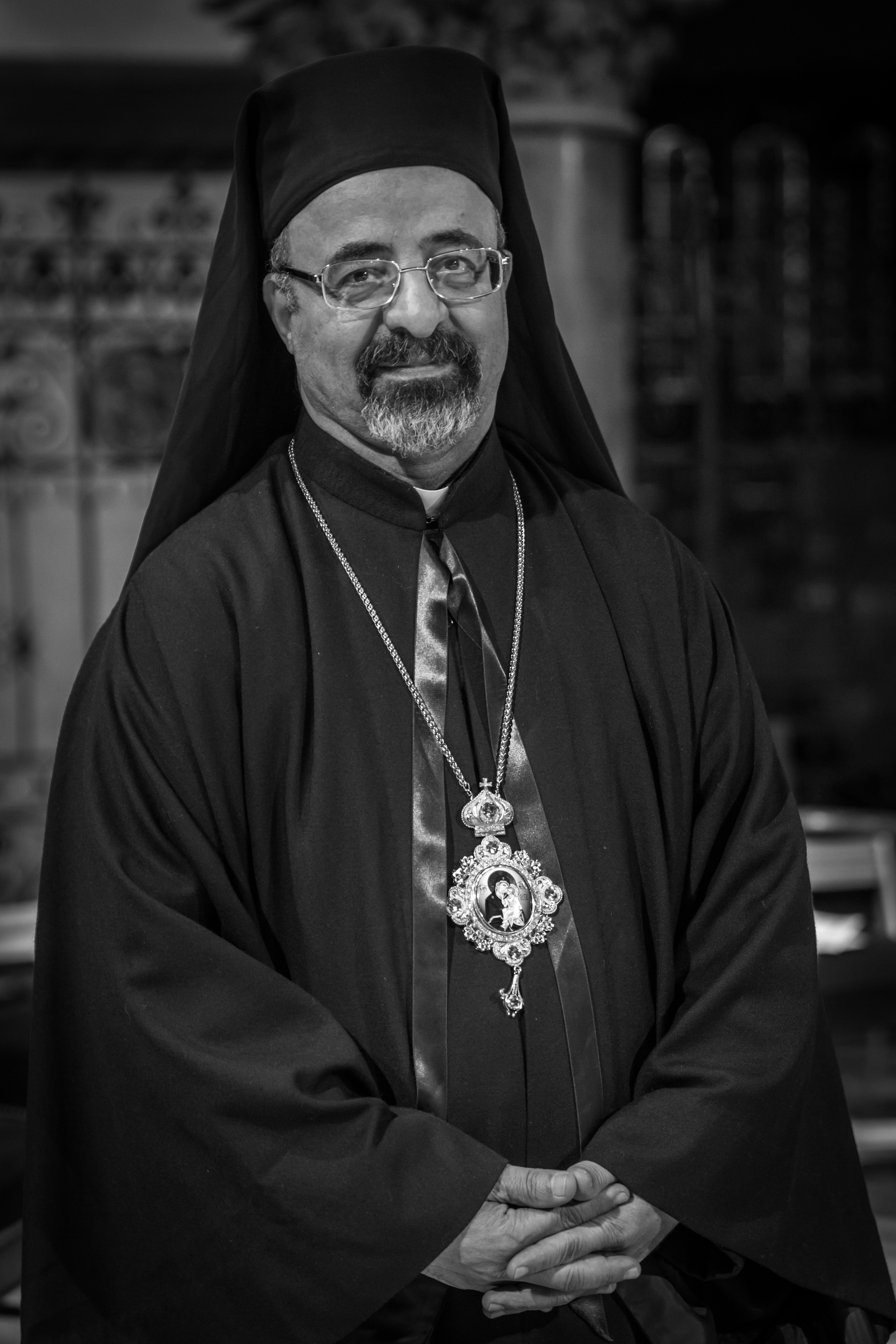
- Sidrak in 2014
- Church: Coptic Catholic Church
- Archdiocese: Alexandria
- See: Alexandria
- Elected: 15 January 2013
- Predecessor: Antonios I Naguib
- Other posts: Bishop of Alexandria (since 2013); President of the Synod of the Coptic Catholic Church (since 2013); President of the Assembly of the Catholic Hierarchy of Egypt (since 2013)
- Previous posts: Bishop of Minya (2002–2013); Apostolic Administrator of Giza (2017–2018)

Orders
- Ordination: 7 February 1980
- Consecration: 15 November 2002 by Stéphanos II Ghattas
- Rank: Patriarch

Personal details
- Born: Ibrahim Isaac Sidrak; 19 August 1955 (age 71) Beni-Chokeir, Asyut Governorate, Egypt
- Education: Pontifical Gregorian University

Styles of Ibrahim Isaac Sidrak
- Reference style: His Beatitude
- Spoken style: Your Beatitude
- Religious style: His Holiness

Ibrahim Isaac Sidrak (Coptic: ⲁⲃⲣⲁϩⲁⲙ ⲓⲥⲁⲁⲕ ⲥⲉⲇⲣⲁⲕ, Arabic: إبراهيم إسحاق سدراك; born 19 August 1955) is the current Coptic Catholic Patriarch of Alexandria.

== Biography ==
Ibrahim Isaac Sidrak was born on 19 August 1955 in Beni-Chokeir, Asyut Governorate. He studied philosophy and theology at St. Leo's Patriarchal Seminary in Maadi (a suburb of Cairo) and was ordained a priest in 1980. For the following two years he served in the Parish of Archangel Michael in Cairo. He was sent to Rome to study at the Pontifical Gregorian University and received his doctorate in dogmatic theology. Between 1990 and 2001, he was the rector of the Patriarchal Seminary. For a short period in 2002, he served as the parish priest of the patriarchal Cathedral of Our Lady of Egypt in Cairo. In October 2002, he was elected Bishop of Minya, a post in which he served until his canonical election as patriarch.

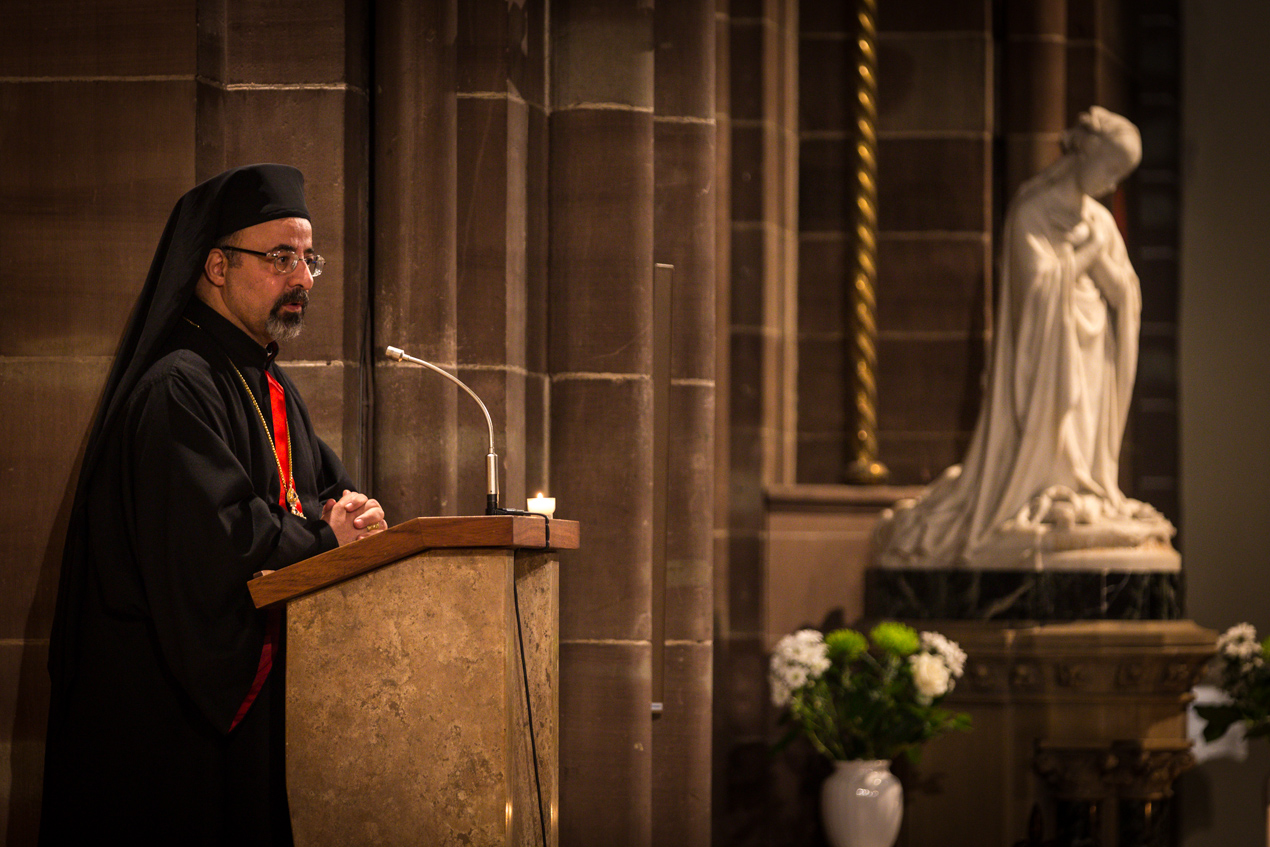
Sidrak giving a speech at St-Pierre-le-Jeune Church in Strasbourg, 2014.

Sidrak was elected as Coptic Catholic Patriarch of Alexandria on 15 January 2013, succeeding Antonios I Naguib, who had resigned because of poor health. (He had a stroke, suffered partial paralysis and underwent brain surgery.) Sidrak asked for and received ecclesiastical communion from Pope Benedict XVI three days later, on 18 January 2013.

Sidrak often worked closely with Pope Francis and the Coptic Orthodox Pope, Tawadros II, with the goal and aim of unifying the Coptic Orthodox and Coptic Catholic churches of Egypt.

== Sources ==
- Rinuncia del Patriarca di Alessandria dei Copti (Egitto) ed Elezione del Nuovo Patriarca, Holy See Press Office

Catholic Church titles
Preceded by Antonios Naguib	Bishop of Minya; 2002 – 2013	Succeeded by Kamal Fahim Awad (Boutros) Hanna
Preceded by Antonios Naguib	Coptic Patriarch of Alexandria; 2013 – present	Incumbent
