= Makarios Tewfik =

Egyptian Coptic Catholic bishop (born 1945)

The Most Reverend Makarios Tewfik
- Eparch Emeritus of Ismaylia
- Church: Coptic Catholic Church
- Province: Patriarchate of Alexandria
- Diocese: Ismaylia
- Installed: 23 June 1994
- Term ended: 14 June 2019
- Predecessor: Youhannes Ezzat Zakaria Badir
- Successor: Daniel Lotfy Khella

Orders
- Ordination: 10 September 1972 by Andraos Ghattas
- Consecration: 22 July 1994 by Stephanos II Ghattas

Personal details
- Born: Makarios Tewfik; 19 May 1945 (age 81) Kotna, Girga Governorate, Kingdom of Egypt
- Education: University of Cairo, Pontifical Urban University, University of Bari

Makarios Tewfik (born 19 May 1945) is an Egyptian Coptic Catholic hierarch who served as the Eparch (Bishop) of the Eparchy of Ismaylia from 1994 until his retirement in 2019.

== Early life and ministry ==
Tewfik was born on 19 May 1945 in the village of Kotna (Al-Qatna) within the present day Sohag Governorate, Egypt. He grew up in a devout Coptic Catholic community. He obtained a Bachelor of Arts degree from Cairo University in 1968, and went on to pursue theological and philosophical studies in Rome, where he studied at the Propaganda Fide. Following his studies, he was ordained to the priesthood for the Eparchy of Luxor on 10 September 1972 by Bishop Andraos Ghattas.

After his ordination, Tewfik served as an assistant priest of the St. George parish in Luxor from 1972 to 1974, at the seminary in Maadi from 1974 to 1975, then again in Luxor from 1975 to 1977, then the priest at the Angel Michael in Nagaa al-Sayyagh from 1977 to 1984. After that, from 1984 until 1991 and from 1993 until 1994 he was a spiritual director at the Major Seminary in Maadi and a professor of a canon law, and in 1990 he was appointed in charge of the papal missionary institutions. He then traveled to specialize in ecumenical studies in the southern Italian city of Bari from September 1991 to September 1993, and received a master's degree in ecumenical studies and in 1993.

== Episcopal ministry ==
On 23 June 1994, the Synod of the Coptic Catholic Church elected Tewfik as the Eparch of Ismayliah to succeed Youhannes Ezzat Zakaria Badir, and his election was officially confirmed by Pope John Paul II. He was consecrated as a bishop on 22 July 1994 by the Coptic Catholic Patriarch of Alexandria, Stephanos II Ghattas, assisted by other bishops of the Church.

During his episcopate, Tewfik oversaw pastoral care, community developments, and the growth of lay ecclesial movements within the Ismayliah eparchy. He frequently highlighted structural societal dynamics affecting the Christian minority in Egypt, noting at times the presence of administrative challenges and discriminatory attitudes encountered by local communities when trying to obtain building permits for churches.

On 6 February 2017, Tewfik met with Pope Francis during an official ad limina visit to the Vatican alongside other members of the assembly of Coptic Catholic Bishops.

== Retirement ==
He resigned from the pastoral governance of the Eparchy of Ismayliah on 14 June 2019, and was succeeded by Daniel Lotfy Khella.

Following his transition to Eparch Emeritus, Tewfik remained active in national youth pastoral works, including presiding over the opening of major Coptic Catholic Youth Conferences in Egypt.
