= Ignace Gladès Berzi =

Egyptian Coptic Catholic bishop (1867–1925)

- Eparch of Luxor
- Church: Coptic Catholic Church
- Diocese: Eparchy of Luxor
- In office: 6 March 1896 – 29 January 1925
- Predecessor: Eparchy erected
- Successor: Markos II Khouzam

Orders
- Ordination: 29 June 1891 by Gaudenzio Bonfigli
- Consecration: 29 March 1896 by Kyrillos Makarios

Personal details
- Born: 7 January 1867
- Died: 29 January 1925 (aged 58)

Ignace Gladès Berzi (7 January 1867 in Ghirghe – 29 January 1925) was an Egyptian Coptic Catholic hierarch, who served as an eparchial bishop of Eparchy of Luxor. He was appointed in 1896, and died in 1925.
