= Eparchy of Luxor =

Coptic Catholic eparchy in Egypt

Eparchy of Luxor Eparchia Thebana

Location
- Territory: Luxor, Qena, Red Sea, and Aswan governorates

Statistics
- Population: 22,600 (2023)
- Parishes: 18 (2023)

Information
- Sui iuris church: Coptic Catholic Church
- Rite: Alexandrian (Coptic)
- Established: 26 November 1895
- Cathedral: Cathedral of Saint George, Luxor

Current leadership
- Eparch: Emmanuel Bishay

Map
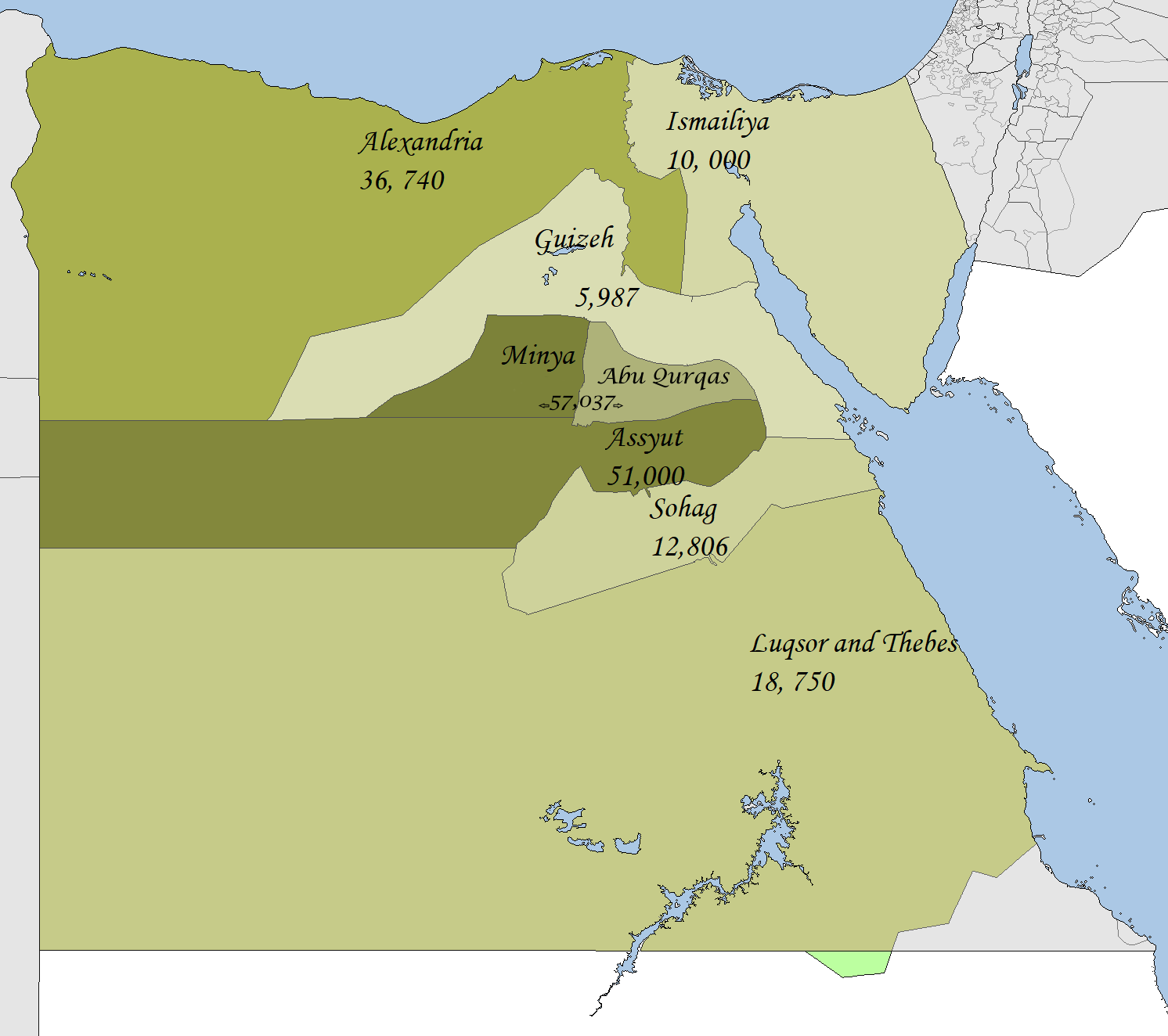

The Coptic Catholic Eparchy of Luxor, historically known as the Eparchy of Thebes (Latin: Eparchia Thebana), is a suffragan eparchy (Eastern Catholic diocese) of the Coptic Catholic Church, an Eastern Catholic Church in full communion with the Holy See.

The eparchy's jurisdiction covers the southern governorates of Egypt, with its episcopal see located in Luxor (ancient Thebes). The current eparch is Emmanuel Bishay.

== History ==
The eparchy was officially erected on 26 November 1895 by Pope Leo XIII through the apostolic constitution Christi Domini, which re-established the Coptic Catholic Patriarchate of Alexandria. The document designated the historical site of Thebes (Luxor) as one of the original suffragan sees of the patriarchate, establishing its territorial bounds across Upper Egypt.

As the Coptic Catholic population in the region grew, the expansive territory of the Eparchy of Luxor was progressively divided to establish new jurisdictions:

- On 9 August 1947, Pope Pius XII issued the decree Quo in Aegypto, partitioning the northern territories of the Eparchy to erect the Eparchy of Asyut.
- On 13 September 1981, a second territorial division occurred, detaching further regions to establish the Eparchy of Sohag, thereby restricting the Eparchy of Luxor to its modern boundaries spanning the southern reaches of Egypt.

== Territory and Statistics ==
The eparchy's pastoral territory encompasses the Egyptian governorates of Luxor, Qena, Aswan, and the Red Sea.

As of 2026, the eparchy pastorally served approximately 25,000 Coptic Catholics across 21 parishes, under the spiritual care of 37 diocesan and religious priests, and around 70 religious. Its primary liturgical celebration follows the Alexandrian (Coptic) Rite, conducted in the Coptic language and Arabic.

== Eparchial Bishops ==
- Ignace Gladès Berzi (6 March 1896 – died 29 January 1925)
- Markos Khouzam (6 August 1926 – 10 August 1947), later Patriarch
- Alexandros Scandar (14 December 1947 – 21 June 1949), Apostolic Administrator
- Isaac Ghattas (21 June 1949 – 8 May 1967), Archbishop since 1963
- Andraos Ghattas, C.M. (8 May 1967 – 9 June 1986), later Patriarch
- Aghnatios Elias Yaacoub, S.J. (15 July 1986 – died 12 March 1994)
- Youhannes Ezzat Zakaria Badir (24 June 1994 – 27 December 2015)
- Emmanuel Bishay (since 16 April 2016).

=== Auxiliary Bishops ===
- Youhanna Nueir, OFM, titular bishop of Phatanus (8 December 1955 – 26 March 1965)
- Youannès Malak, titular bishop of Dioclea (4 November 1978 – 1982)
