= Maximos Sedfaoui =

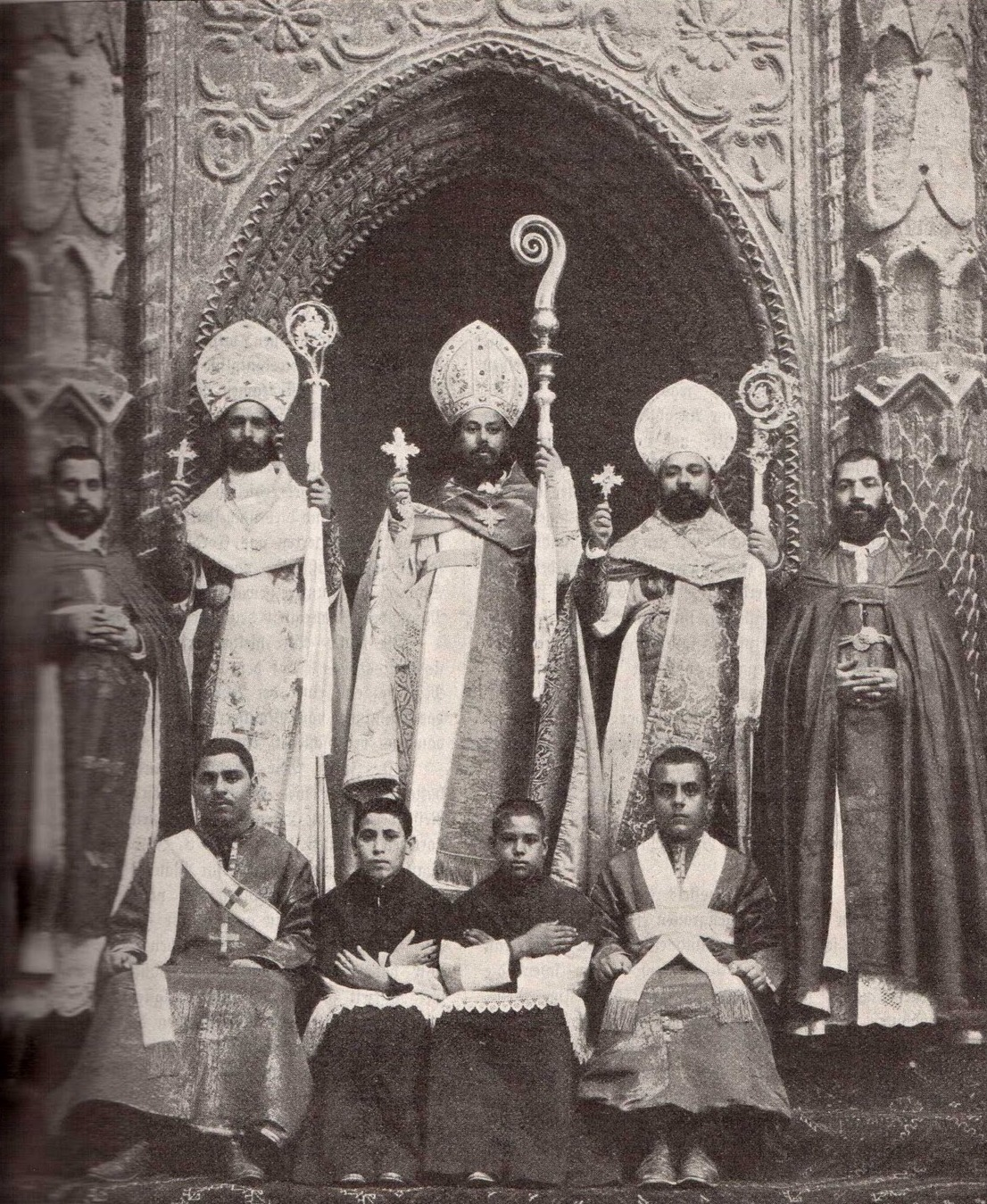
Maximos Sedfawi (left) in 1900.

Maximos Sedfaoui (17 August 1863 – 27 February 1925) was the locum tenens and Apostolic Administrator (مدبّر رسولي) of the Coptic Catholic Church after the resignation of Patriarch Kyrillos Makarios in 1908. The Patriarch's exclusion and eventual travel to Beirut, Lebanon and the appointment of Sedfawi was greeted by a long series of opposition and demands for the reinstatement of Patriarch Makarios, but to no avail.

Maximos Swedfawi was born in Akhmim, Egypt as Youssef Sedfawi. He studied at the Oriental College and later on received his doctorate in Theology in 1889. He was ordained as a Coptic Catholic priest in Beirut on 29 June 1889 and returned to Egypt. Also known as Joseph-Maxime Sedfaoui (sometimes Sedfawi), he was appointed Coptic Catholic Bishop of Hermopolis (Minia) from 1896. He was also appointed as Apostolic Administrator, a post he carried simultaneously from 1908 onwards until his death in 1925. He was succeeded by locum tenens Markos Khouzam starting 1927 until the latter's election as Patriarch in 1947.
