= Liturgical book =

Christian prayer book

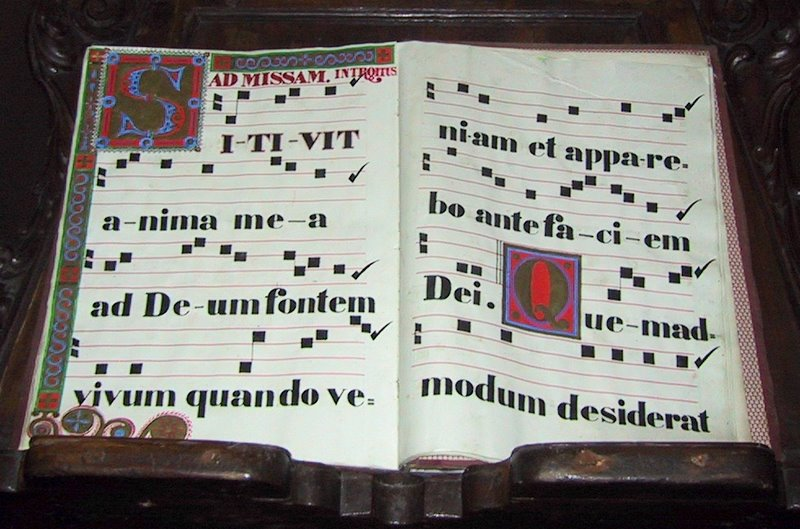
Manuscript of the Introit of the Mass (from Psalm 42), Florence, Italy.

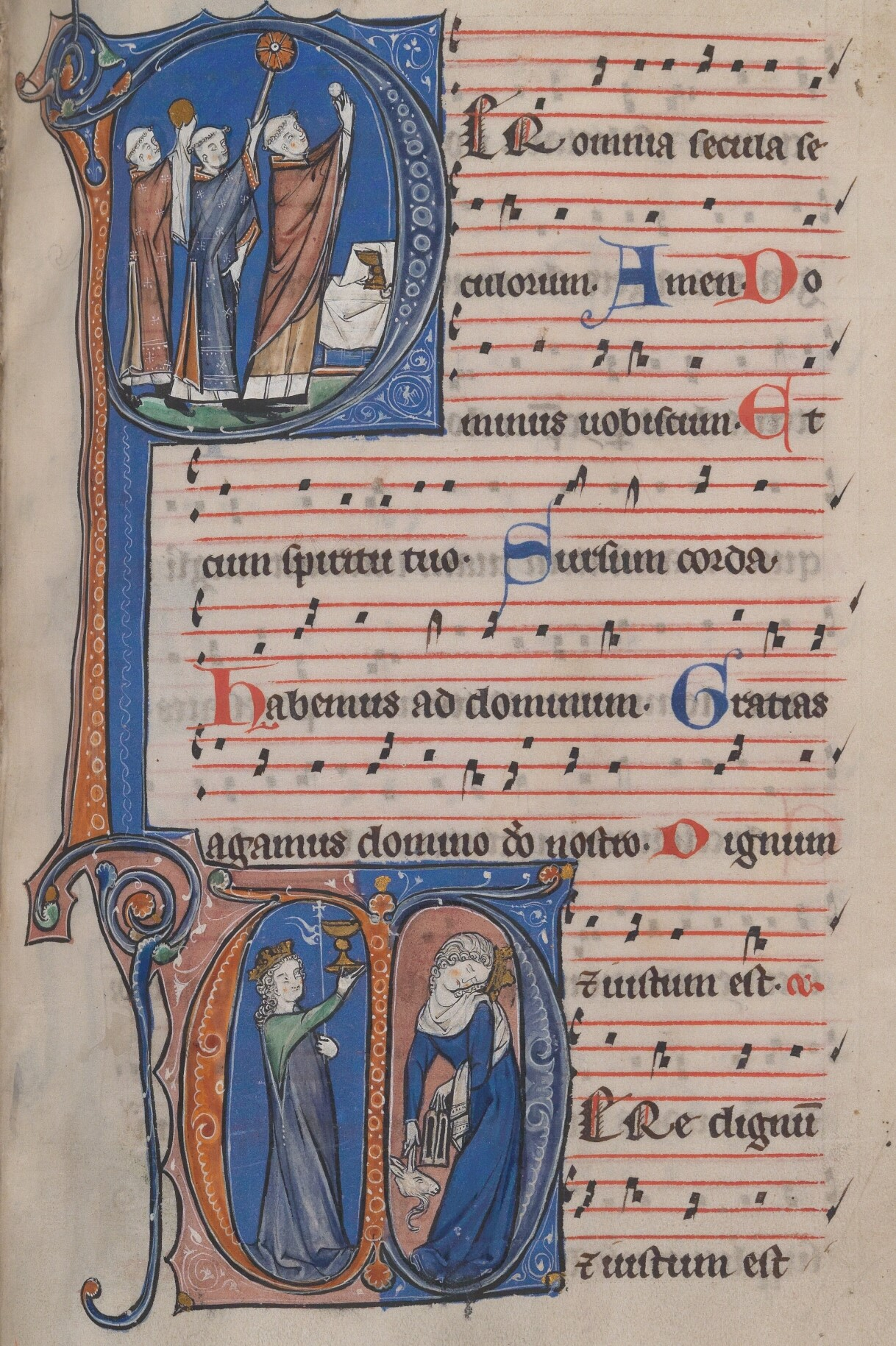
Excerpt from the missal, a liturgical book, of the Sint-Pieters Abbey (Ghent), from the 13th century. Manuscript preserved in the Ghent University Library.

A liturgical book, or service book, is a book published by the authority of a church body that contains the text and directions for the liturgy of its official religious services.

== Christianity ==
=== Roman Rite ===
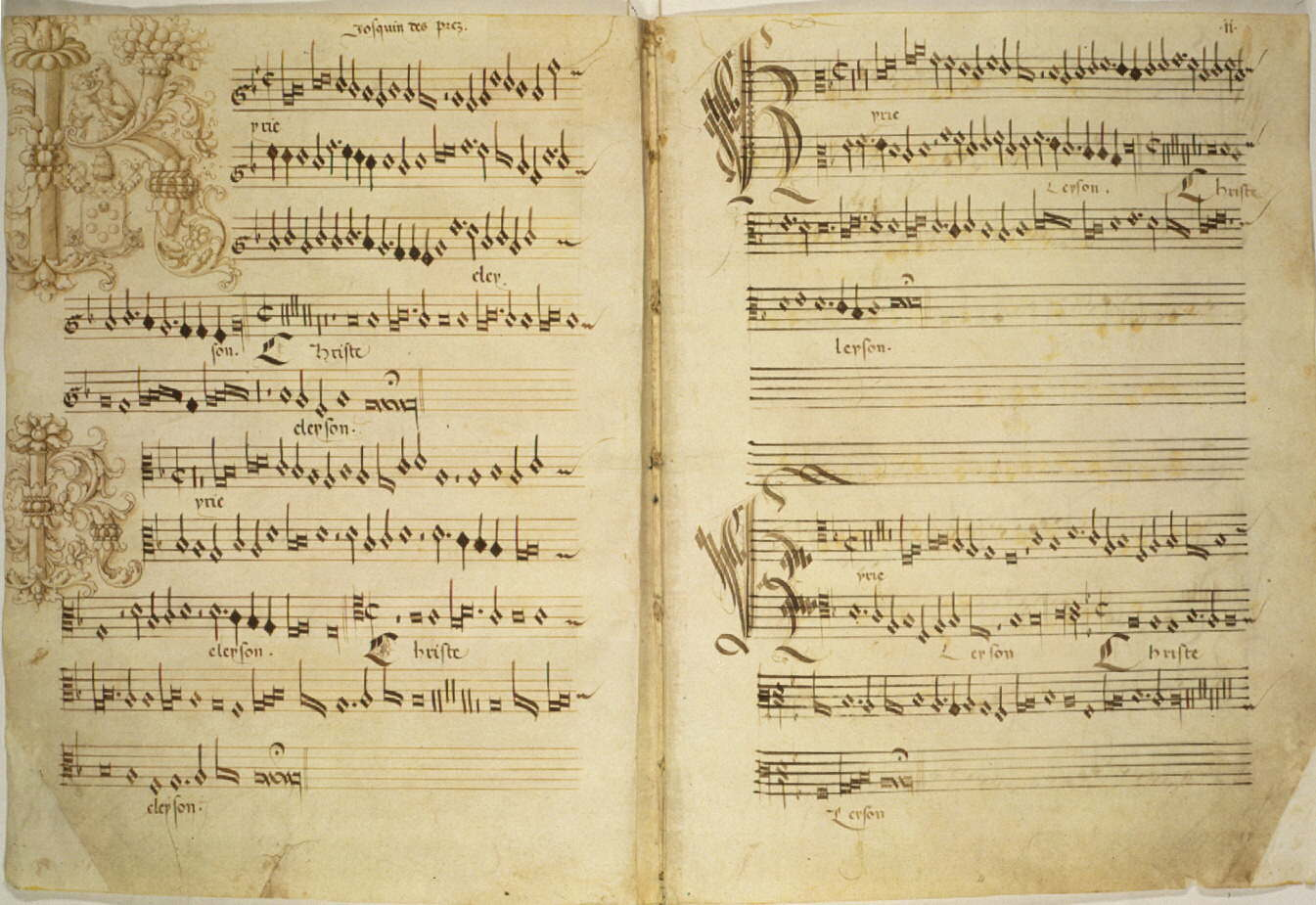
Early 16th century choirbook with Josquin's Missa de Beata Virgine (Biblioteca Apostolica Vaticana, MS Cappella Sistina 45, folios 1v–2r.).

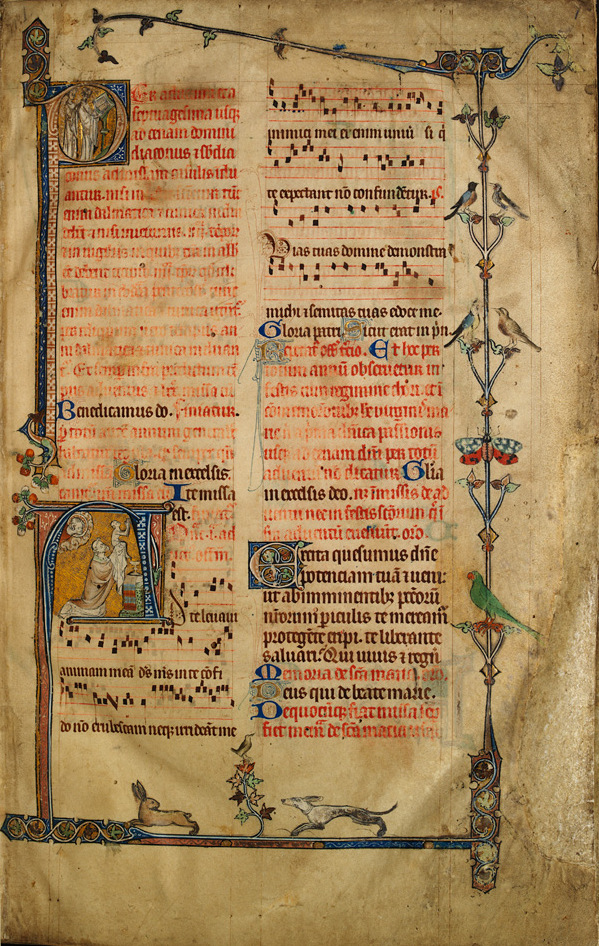
A decorative 14th century Missal of English origin, F. 1r. Sherbrooke Missal

In the Roman Rite of the Catholic Church, the primary liturgical books are the Roman Missal, which contains the texts of the Mass, and the Roman Breviary, which contains the text of the Liturgy of the Hours. With the 1969 reform of the Roman Missal by Pope Paul VI, now called the "Ordinary Form of the Roman Rite", the selection of Scriptural readings was expanded considerably and thus required a new book called the Lectionary. The Roman Ritual contains the texts for administering some sacraments other than the Mass such as baptism, the sacrament of penance, the anointing of the sick, and the sacrament of marriage. The texts for the sacraments and ceremonies normally reserved to bishops, such as Confirmation and Holy Orders, are contained within the Roman Pontifical. The Caeremoniale Episcoporum (The Ceremonial of Bishops) describes in greater detail than the ordinary liturgical books the ceremonies involved when a bishop presides over the celebration of Mass, the celebration of the Liturgy of the Hours or of the Word of God, particular Masses such as Candlemas, Palm Sunday or the Easter Vigil, the other sacraments, sacramentals, pastoral visitations etc. The Roman Martyrology, meanwhile, gives an account of all the saints (not only martyrs) commemorated in the Church each day.

Other Roman-Rite liturgical books include the Roman Gradual and the Gospel Book or Evangeliary.

The Catholic Church is composed of 24 autonomous particular churches, the largest of which is the Latin Church. The other 23 churches are collectively called the Eastern Catholic Churches; Eastern Catholic liturgy encompasses the Alexandrian Rite, Antiochene Rite, Armenian Rite, Byzantine Rite, and the East Syriac Rite among others.

While the Roman Rite of the Latin Church is by far the most common liturgical rite found within the Latin Church, a number of local Latin liturgical rites and uses also exist.

=== Byzantine Rite ===
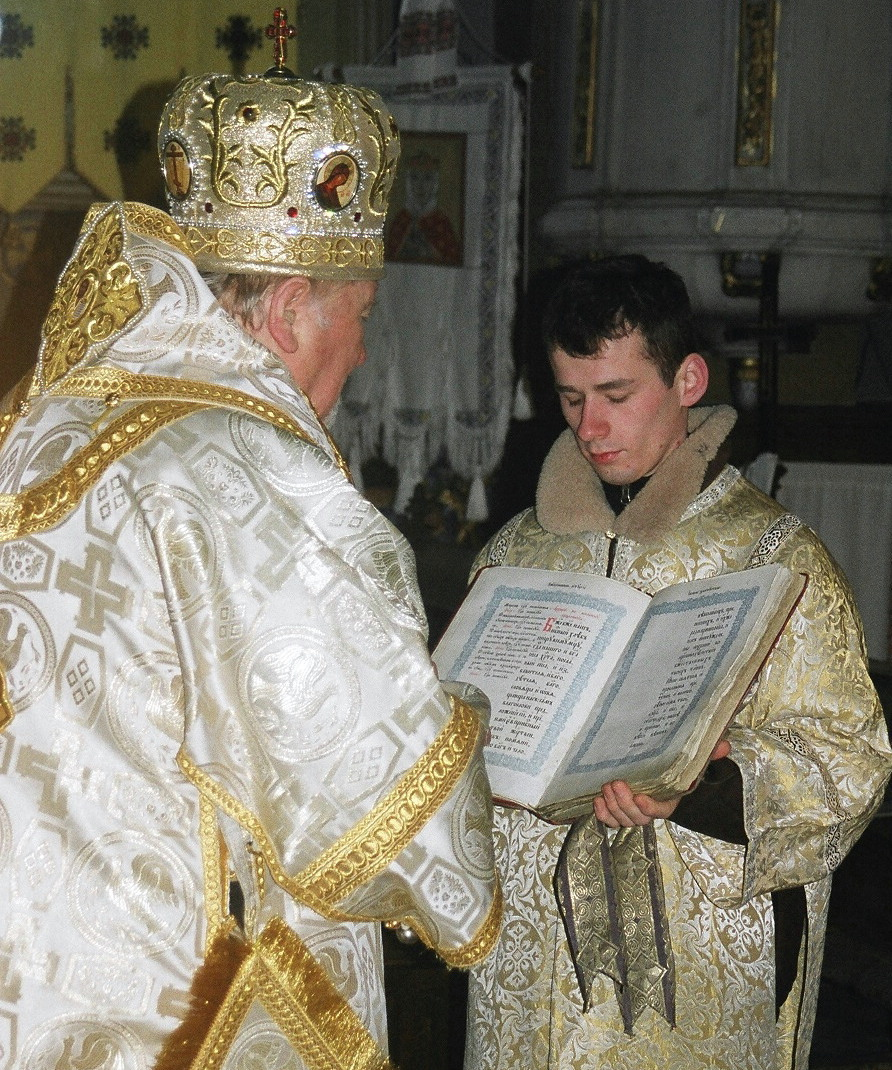
An altar server holds the Chinovnik for an Orthodox bishop during a divine service

The Rite of Constantinople, observed by the Eastern Orthodox Church and those Eastern Catholic Churches which follow the Byzantine Rite, represents one of the most highly developed liturgical traditions in Christendom. While the Roman Catholic Liturgy of the Hours may be published in a single-volume breviary, this is not feasible for the Byzantine Rite, which requires a large number of books to chant the daily services.

The regular services chanted in the Constantinopolitan liturgical tradition are the Canonical Hours and the Divine Liturgy. There are, in addition, occasional services (baptism, confession, etc.) and intercessory or devotional services (molieben, panikhida), which are not chanted on a daily basis, but according to need. The fixed portions of the services are called acolouthia (Greek: ἀκολουθίες, akolouthies; Church Slavonic: Последование, romanized: Posledovanie), into which the sequences (changeable portions) are inserted. The sequences can also be referred to as propers.

The sequences are governed by the convergence of several liturgical cycles, including the Paschal Cycle (movable cycle, dependent upon the variable date of Easter) and the Menaion (fixed cycle, dependent upon the calendar date).

==== Acolouthia ====
The fixed portions of the services are found in the following liturgical books:

- Horologion (Greek: Ωρολόγιον; Church Slavonic: Часослов, romanized: Chasoslov), or Book of Hours, provides the fixed portions of the services as used by the reader and the chanters. For the sake of convenience, some small portions of the sequences are often included as well, such as feast day troparia, kontakia, and those portions which change according to the day of the week. The Horologion may also contain some devotional material such as the Prayers Before Communion, Thanksgiving After Communion, and Morning and Evening Prayers.
- Euchologion (Greek: Ευχολόγιον, Eukhologion; Church Slavonic: Служебник, romanized: Sluzhebnik)—Contains the fixed portions of the services which are said by the priest and deacon, as well as some of the variable portions which the clergy use, such as prokeimena and dismissals. The Great Euchologion contains the clergy parts of Vespers, Matins, the three Divine Liturgies, Compline and Midnight Office, the Lenten Hours. It also contains the complete services (including the parts for reader and chanters) for the Sacred Mysteries (Sacraments), Funeral, Monastic Tonsure, Consecration of a Church, and other occasional services. For convenience, the contents of the Great Euchologion in the Slavic tradition have been divided up as follows:
  - Litourgicon (Church Slavonic: Служебник, romanized: Sluzhebnik)—contains Vespers, Matins and the three Divine Liturgies
  - Archieratikon (Church Slavonic: Чиновник, romanized: Chinovnik)—contains the parts of services performed by a bishop
  - Euchologion (Church Slavonic: Требник, romanized: Trebnik)—omits the portions contained in the Litourgicon and Archieratikon, and adds other minor acolouthia (such as the blessing of an Iconostasis, Holy Vessels, Vestments, etc.)

==== Sequences ====
Into this fixed framework, numerous movable parts of the service are inserted. These are taken from a variety of liturgical books:

- Psalter (Greek: Ψαλτήριον, Psalterion; Church Slavonic: Псалтирь, romanized: Psaltir’) – A book containing the 150 Psalms divided into Kathismata (Note: There is also a Psalm 151 included in the Orthodox Psalter, though it is not actually chanted during the Divine Services.) together with the Biblical Canticles which are chanted at Matins. (Note: Originally, these canticles were chanted in their entirety every day, but they gradually came to be replaced by the Canon and are now normally only chanted on weekdays of Great Lent.) The Psalter is used at Vespers and Matins, (Note: During Great Lent, Kathismata are read at the Little Hours also.) and normally contains tables for determining which Kathismata are to be read at each service, depending upon the day of the week and the liturgical season of the year.
- Octoechos (Greek: Παρακλητική, Paraklētikē; Church Slavonic: Октоих, romanized: Oktoikh, or Осмогласник, Osmoglasnik) – Literally, the Book of the "Eight Tones" or modes. This book contains an eight-week cycle, providing texts to be chanted for every day of the week at Vespers, Matins, Compline and (on Sundays) the Midnight Office. Each week, the hymns are sung in a different liturgical Mode or Tone. The origins of this book go back to compositions by St. John Damascene.
- Menaion (Greek: Μηναίον; Church Slavonic: Минея, romanized: Mineya) – A twelve-volume set which provides all liturgical texts for each day of the calendar year (including the akrosticha for the Irmologion). (Note: On non-leap years, the service for February 29 (St. John Cassian) may be chanted at Compline on Feb. 28 or some other more convenient day.) The twelve volumes correspond to the months of the year. The liturgical year begins in September, so the first volume of the Menaion is September.
- Sticherarion (Greek: Στιχηραριὸν, today Δόξασταριον) was called a chant book usually with musical notation. It is subdivided in the stichera for the cycle of the fixed feasts according to the yearly cycle between September and August (Menaion). The cycle of mobile feast is subdivided into two books. The first called Triodion contains the stichera sung during Lent and the Holy week, the second called Pentecostarion contains the post-paschal period between Easter and Pentecost, the weekly cycle after Pentecost until the Sunday of All Saints.
  - Triodion (Greek: Τριῴδιον, Triodion; Church Slavonic: Триодь постная, romanized: Triod’ postnaya; Romanian: Triodul)—Also called the Lenten Triodion. During Great Lent the services undergo profound changes. The Lenten Triodion contains propers for:
    - the Pre-Lenten Season
    - the Forty Days of Great Lent itself
    - Lazarus Saturday and Palm Sunday
    - Holy Week
  - Pentecostarion (Greek: Πεντηκοστάριον, Pentekostarion; Church Slavonic: Триодь цветная, romanized: Triod’ tsvetnaya, literally "Flowery Triodon"; Romanian: Penticostar) – This volume contains the propers for the period from Pascha to the Sunday of All Saints. This period can be broken down into the following periods:
    - Bright Week (Easter Week) – The seven days from the Pascha (Easter Sunday) through the following Saturday
    - Paschal Season – The period from Thomas Sunday until Ascension
    - Ascension and its Afterfeast
    - Pentecost and its Afterfeast
    - All Saints Sunday (the Sunday after Pentecost)
- Synaxarion (Greek: Συναξάριον; Church Slavonic: Синаксарь, romanized: Sinaksar’: Romanian: Sinaxar) – The Synaxarion contains brief lives of the saints for each day of the year, usually read at Matins.
- Irmologion (Greek: Ειρμολόγιον, Heirmologion; Church Slavonic: Ирмологий, romanized: Irmology) – Contains the Irmoi chanted at the Canon of Matins and other services.
- Gospel Book (Greek: Ευαγγέλιον, Evangelion; Church Slavonic: Евангелие, romanized: Evangelie) – Book containing the Gospel readings that are used at Matins, Divine Liturgy, and other services. Among the Greeks the Evangélion is laid out in order of the cycle of readings as they occur in the ecclesiastical year, with a section in the back providing the Gospel readings for Matins, Feasts and special occasions. In the Slavic usage, the Evangélion contains the four gospels in canonical order (Matthew, Mark, Luke, John) with annotations in the margin to indicate the beginning and ending of each reading (and an index in the back).
- Epistle Book (Greek: Απόστολος, Apostolos; Church Slavonic: Апостол, romanized: Apostol) – Contains the readings from the Epistles and the Acts of the Apostles (the Apocalypse is not read during Divine Services in the Orthodox Church). It also contains the Prokeimenon and Alleluia verses that are chanted with the readings. The Apostól is laid out in the same manner as the Evangélion, depending on whether the book was prepared for the Greek or Slavic usage. (Note: The Slavonic Apostól will have all of the books of the New Testament (excluding the Gospels and Apocalypse) in their entirety, though not in the same order they are found in most English Bibles (Acts is placed first, etc.).)

==== Other ====
- Typicon (Greek: Τυπικόν, Typikon; Church Slavonic: Типикон, сиесть Устав, romanized: Tipikon, siest’ Ustav)—The book which ties all of the above together. It contains all of the rubrics, i.e., the rules for the performance of the Divine Services, giving directions for every possible combination of the materials from the other liturgical books into the Daily Cycle of Services. Many churches also publish annual liturgical calendars which give detailed instructions from the Typicon which are specific to the concurrence of sequences for that particular year.
- Anthologion (Greek: Ανθολόγιον, Anthologion; Church Slavonic: Сборник, romanized: Sbornik)—There are numerous smaller anthologies available, taking portions from the books mentioned above, or from other sources. For instance, the Festal Menaion contains only those portions of the Menaion that have to do with the Great Feasts; and the General Menaion contains propers for each class of saints (with blank spaces for the name of the saint) which may be employed when one does not have the propers for that particular saint; etc.

There are many different editions of these books which have been published over the years in a variety of liturgical languages. In Greek the Orthodox books are published at the Phœnix Press (formerly located in Venice, now at Patras), the Eastern Catholic Churches (Byzantine rite) books are published by the Congregation for the Oriental Churches. Each national Church has further its own editions in its liturgical language. There are also books of all kinds which collect and arrange materials from the list of books above into compendiums by various editors.

=== Assyrian ===
The books of the Church of the East, all in Syriac, are:

- the Liturgy (containing their three liturgies)
- the Gospel (Evangelion), Apostle (Shlicha), and Lessons (Kariane)
- the "Turgama" (Interpretation), containing hymns sung by deacons at the liturgy (corresponding to the Graduals and Sequences of the Roman Rite)
- the David (Dawidha = Psalter)
- the "Khudhra" (= "cycle", containing antiphons, responsories, hymns, and collects for all Sundays)
- the "Kash Kõl" (= "Collection of all"; the same chants for week-days)
- the "Kdham u-Wathar" (= "Before and after"; certain prayers, psalms, and collects most often used, from the other books)
- the "Gezza" ("Treasury", services for feast-days)
- the Abu-Halim (the name of the compiler, containing collects for the end of the Nocturns on Sundays)
- the "Bautha d'Ninwaie" (= "Prayer of the Ninevites", a collection of hymns ascribed to Ephrem the Syrian, used in Lent).
- the Baptism Office ("Taksa d'Amadha") (generally bound up with the Liturgies)
- the "Taksa d'Siamidha" (containing ordination services)
- the "Taksa d'Husaia" (containing the office for Penance)
- the "Kthawa d'Burrakha" (containing the marriage service)
- the "Kahneita" (containing the burial of clergy)
- the "Annidha" (containing the burial of laypeople)
- the "Khamis" (a collection of hymns)
- the "Warda" (a collection of hymns).

Naturally not every church possesses this varied collection of books. The most necessary ones are printed by the Anglican missionaries at Urmi for the "Nestorian" Christians. The Chaldean Catholic books are printed, some at Propaganda, some by the Dominicans at Mosul ("Missale chaldaicum", 1845; "Manuale Sacerdotum", 1858; "Breviarium chaldaicum", 1865). A Chaldean "Breviary" was published in three volumes at Paris in 1886–1887, edited by Paul Bedgan, a missionary of the Congrégation des Missions. The Malabar Christians use the traditional books of the Church of the East, and the Syro-Malabar Church have books revised by the Synod of Diamper (1599). The Malabar Catholic "Missal" was published at Rome in 1774, the "Ordo rituum et lectionum" in 1775.

=== Coptic ===
The Coptic Books (in Coptic with Arabic rubrics, and generally with the text transliterated in Arabic characters too) are the Euchologion (Kitãb al-Khulagi almuqaddas), very often (but quite wrongly) called Missal. This corresponds to the Byzantine Euchologion. The Coptic equivalent of the Horologion is the Agpeya. Then the Lectionary called Katamãrus; the Synaksãr, containing legends of saints; the "Deacon's Manual"; an Antiphonary (called Difnãri); the Psalter, Theotokia (containing offices of the Virgin Mary); Doxologia; collections of hymns for the choir and a number of smaller books for the various other offices.

The Coptic Orthodox Church has a very sumptuously printed set of their books, edited by Gladios Labib, published at Cairo (Katamãrus, 1900–1902; Euchologion, 1904; Funeral Service, 1905).

These books were first grouped and arranged for the Coptic Catholic Church by Raphael Tuki, and printed at Rome in the eighteenth century. Their arrangement is obviously an imitation of that of the Latin service-books (Missale coptice et arabice, 1736; Diurnum alexandrinum copto-arabicum, 1750; Pontificale et Euchologium, 1761, 1762; Rituale coptice et arabice, 1763; Theotokia, 1764). Kyrillos Makarios, the Coptic Catholic Patriarchate of Alexandria, published a "missal", "ritual", and "Holy Week book" (Cairo, 1898–1902).

=== Ethiopian ===
The Ethiopian service books are, with the exception of the Eucharistic Liturgy (the Missal), the least known of any. Hardly anything of them has been published, and no one seems yet to have made a systematic investigation of liturgical manuscripts in Abyssinia. Since the Ethiopic or Ge'ez Rite is derived from the Coptic, their books correspond more or less to the Coptic books.

Peter the Ethiopian (Petrus Ethyops) published the Liturgy with the baptism service and some blessings at the end of his edition of the Ethiopic New Testament (Tasfa Sion, Rome, 1548). Various students have published fragments of the Rite in Europe (cf. Chaine, "Grammaire éthiopienne", Beirut, 1907; bibliography, p. 269), but these can hardly be called service-books.

=== Syriac Orthodox/Catholic ===
The Syriac Orthodox (Jacobite) and Catholic liturgical books have never been published as a whole. A fragment of the liturgy was published in Syriac and Latin at Antwerp (1572) by Fabricius Boderianus (D. Seven alexandrini ... de ritibus baptismi et sacræ Synaxis).

The Syriac Catholics have a Euchologion (Syriac and Karshuni), published at Rome in 1843 (Missale Syriacum), and a "Book of clerks used in the ecclesiastical ministries" (Liber ministerii, Syriac only, Beirut, 1888). The Divine Office, collected like a Breviary, was published at Mosul in seven volumes (1886–96), the ferial office alone at Rome in 1853, and at Sharfi in the Lebanon (1898). A Ritual – "Book of Ceremony" – for the Syriac Catholic Church was issued by the Jesuits at Beirut.

=== Maronite ===
The Maronites have an abundance of liturgical books for their divine liturgy. The Maronite Synod at Deir al-Luweize (1736) committed a uniform preparation of all their books to the patriarch (Part II, Sess. I, xiii, etc.) These books are all referred to in Western or Latin terms (Missal, Ritual, Pontifical, etc.). The Missal (in this case the name is not incorrect) was published at Rome in 1592 and 1716, since then repeatedly, in whole or in part, at Beirut. Little books containing the Ordinary of the Liturgy with the Anaphora commonly used are issued by many Catholic booksellers at Beirut. The "Book of the Minister" (containing the deacon's and other ministers' parts of the Liturgy) was published at Rome in 1596 and at Beirut in 1888. The "Ferial Office", called Fard, "Burden" or "Duty" (the only one commonly used by the clergy), was issued at Rome in 1890, at Beirut in 1900. The whole Divine Office began to be published at Rome in 1666, but only two volumes of the summer part appeared. A Ritual with various additional prayers was issued at Rome in 1839. All Maronite books are in Syriac and Karshuni.

=== Armenian ===
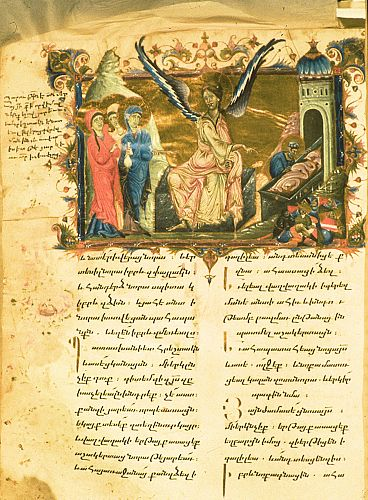
Armenian liturgical manuscript, 13th century, Kilikia.

The Armenian Liturgical Books are quite definitely drawn up, arranged, and authorized. They are the only other set among Eastern Churches whose arrangement can be compared to those of the Byzantines. There are eight official Armenian service-books:

1. the Directory, or Calendar, corresponding to the Byzantine Typikon,
2. the Manual of Mysteries of the Sacred Oblation (= a Euchologion),
3. the Book of Ordinations, often bound up with the former,
4. the Lectionary,
5. the Hymn-book (containing the variable hymns of the Liturgy),
6. the Book of Hours (containing the Divine Office and, generally, the deacon's part of the Liturgy),
7. the Book of Canticles (containing the hymns of the Office),
8. the Mashdotz, or Ritual (containing the rites of the sacraments).

The books of both the Armenian Apostolic Church (Oriental-Orthodox) and Armenian Catholic Church have been published a great number of times; the latest Orthodox editions are those of Constantinople and Jerusalem, the Catholic ones have been issued at Rome, Vienna, and especially Venice (at the Monastery of San Lazaro). There are many extracts from them, especially from the Liturgy.

=== Lutheran ===
Martin Luther was in favor of preserving the Mass of the Church and, other than translating it into the vernacular language of the people, he made very few changes to the liturgy. Over the centuries since the days of the Reformation, the many diverging branches of Lutheran denominations – despite developing a wide swath of differing core beliefs, have maintained and cherished the liturgy and its ancient roots. Owing to its widespread diaspora of branches, and especially because of the wide variety of regional languages, customs, and beliefs, there have been many different books of Worship prepared and used by congregations worldwide.

Besides the formal liturgy itself, Lutheran worship books usually contain the orders for the minor services during the week, such as Vespers, Morning Prayer, and Compline, along with large sections of hymns, Psalms, and prayers and other needed information for the correct following of the liturgical calendar.

One particular Lutheran hymnal, used by the Moderate/Liberal Evangelical Lutheran Church in America, the largest Lutheran denomination in the U.S., is Evangelical Lutheran Worship. The ELW (as it is called) is also used by a few smaller denominations as well, but is mostly frowned upon by more conservative Lutheran bodies, which use their own versions.

=== Anglican ===
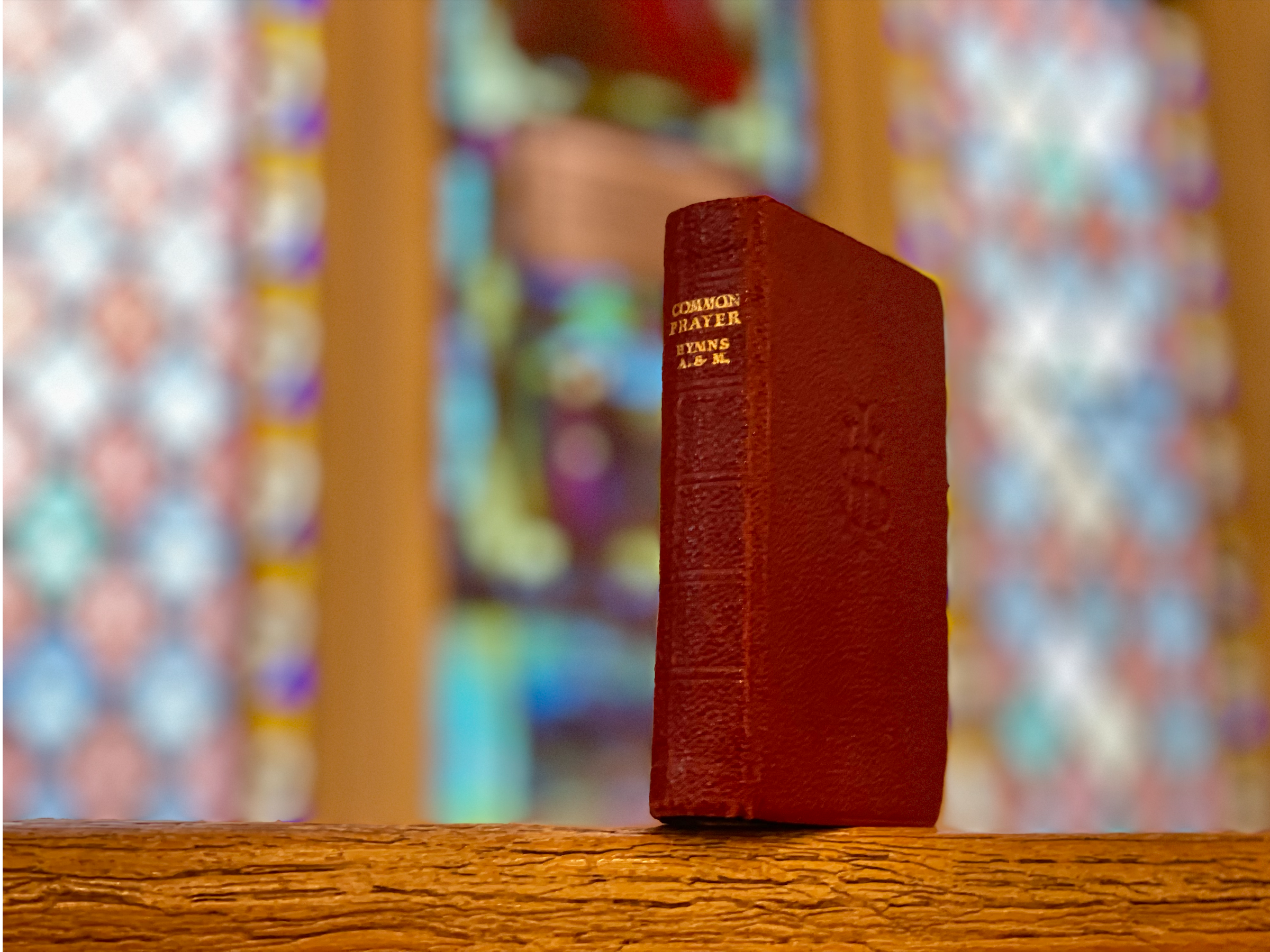
The 1662 Book of Common Prayer, the most widely used Anglican liturgy

In the wake of the English Reformation, a reformed liturgy was introduced into the Church of England. The first liturgical book published for general use throughout the church was the Book of Common Prayer (BCP) of 1549, edited by Thomas Cranmer, Archbishop of Canterbury.

The work of 1549 was the first prayer book to contain the forms of service for daily and Sunday worship in English and to do so within a single volume; it included morning prayer, evening prayer, the Litany, and Holy Communion. The book included the other occasional services in full: the orders for baptism, confirmation, marriage, 'prayers to be said with the sick' and a funeral service. It set out in full the Epistle and Gospel readings for the Sunday Communion Service. Set Old Testament and New Testament readings for daily prayer were specified in tabular format as were the set Psalms; and canticles, mostly biblical, that were provided to be sung between the readings. Numerous editions have followed, and currently throughout the Anglican Communion, various Books of Common Prayer are published by the different Anglican provinces.

Other official books are published by the member churches for the official use of their churches, such as the Lectionary, Book of Occasional Services, etc.

==== Anglo-Catholic ====
In the late 1800s, as part of the Anglo-Catholic movement, the Anglican Missal was published, to provide a particular way, drawn from the Sarum Use, of celebrating the Eucharist according to Anglican liturgical tradition. Many Anglo-Catholic parishes use the Anglican Missal, or some variation of it such as the English Missal, for the celebration of the Eucharist. Variations include the Anglican Service Book and A Manual of Anglo-Catholic Devotion, and the directive books A Priest's Handbook by Dennis Michno and Ceremonies of the Eucharist by Howard E. Galley. All of these books (with the exception of Manual) are intended primarily for celebration of the Eucharist. They contain meditations for the presiding celebrant(s) during the liturgy, and other material such as the rite for the blessing of palms on Palm Sunday, propers for special feast days, and instructions for proper ceremonial order. These books are used as a more expansively Catholic context in which to celebrate the liturgical use found in the BCP and related liturgical books.

=== Methodist ===
John Wesley, the Anglican priest who was a principal leader of the early Methodist revival, wrote that

there is no Liturgy in the world, either in ancient or modern language, which breathes more of a solid, scriptural, rational piety, than the Common Prayer of the Church of England.

When the Methodists in America were separated from the Church of England because of the American Revolution, John Wesley himself provided a revised version of the Book of Common Prayer called the Sunday Service of the Methodists in North America. Wesley's Sunday Service has shaped the official liturgies of the Methodists ever since. For this reason, Methodist liturgy is decidedly Anglican in its character, though Methodists have generally allowed for more flexibility and freedom in how the liturgy is celebrated than is typical of Anglican churches.

Today, the primary liturgical books of the United Methodist Church are The United Methodist Hymnal and The United Methodist Book of Worship, along with their non-English counterparts. The British Methodist Church uses The Methodist Worship Book. These service books contain written liturgy that is generally derived from Wesley's Sunday Service and from the 20th Century liturgical renewal movement. They also contain the hymnody of the Methodist Church, which has always been an important part of Methodist worship.

=== Presbyterian ===
Presbyterianism's first liturgical book is the Book of Common Order, which was written by the denomination's founder, John Knox. The book was published first in Geneva in 1556 under the title Forme of Prayers and was written for use by that city's English Reformed congregation. In 1562 it was adopted by the Church of Scotland, which had been founded two years earlier, and in 1567 was translated into Scottish Gaelic as Foirm na n-Urrnuidheadh for use in the Highlands by Séon Carsuel (John Carswell).

In 1645, the Church of Scotland adopted the Directory for Public Worship, which was written by the Westminster Assembly and intended for use in England, Scotland, and Ireland. It was never translated into Scottish Gaelic.

Since 1906, most Presbyterians in the United States have used their own liturgical book, the Book of Common Worship. Its most recent edition was published in 1993.

== Other religions ==
Confucianism

- The Book of Rites (simplified Chinese: 礼记; traditional Chinese: 禮記, "Liji")
- The Book of Etiquette and Ceremonial (simplified Chinese: 仪礼; traditional Chinese: 儀禮, "Yili")

Shinto

- The Engishiki (延喜式; "The Procedures of the Engi Era") is a book about laws and customs, including liturgical texts

Tenrikyo

- The Mikagura-uta (Japanese: みかぐらうた, "The Songs for the Service")

== See also ==
- Alternative Service Book, Anglican
- Anglican Missal
- Antiphonary
- Book of Alternative Services, Anglican Church of Canada
- Book of Common Prayer, Anglican Communion
- Breviary
- Christian liturgy
- Common Worship, Anglican
- Euchologion – Eastern Christianity
- Evangeliarium
- Gelasian Sacramentary
- Hymnal
- Irmologion – Eastern Christianity
- Liturgical Movement
- Missal
- Missal of Arbuthnott
- Octavarium Romanum
- Octoechos (liturgy) – Eastern Christianity
- Of Exorcisms and Certain Supplications
- Pentecostarion (Byzantine Rite)
- Roman Missal
- Roman Pontifical
- Roman Processional
- Roman Ritual
- The Book of Common Worship of 1906
- The Book of Common Worship of 1932
- The Book of Common Worship of 1946
- The Book of Common Worship of 1993
- The Book of Worship for Church and Home (1965), Methodist
- The Worshipbook of 1970
- Siddur (Judaism)
- Tonary
- Triodion – Eastern Christianity
- Typikon – Eastern Christianity
- Verona Orational

== Sources ==
- This article incorporates text from a publication now in the public domain: Herbermann, Charles, ed. (1913). "Liturgical Books". Catholic Encyclopedia. New York: Robert Appleton Company.
- Kovalchuk, Archpriest Feodor S. (1974), Abridged Typicon (2nd ed.), South Cannna PA: St. Tikhon's Seminary Press (published 1985)
