= Romanum =

Romanum may refer to:

== Administration ==
- The Imperium Romanum or Roman Empire.
- Regnum Romanum was the monarchical government of the city of Rome and its territories.
- Romanum decet pontificem is a papal bull issued by Pope Innocent XII (1691—1700) on June 22, 1692.

== Religion ==
- The Cultus deorum romanum is the name for the official state religion of Ancient Rome
- The Old Roman Symbol (Romanum) is an ancient Christian creed
- Decet Romanum Pontificem (1521) is the papal bull excommunicating Martin Luther.
- Colloquium romanum was a Jesuit Marian elite organization, founded by Jesuit Father Jakob Rem in 1594 AD.
- Graduale Romanum (disambiguation).
- Missale Romanum Glagolitice is a Croatian language missal printed in 1483.
- The Octavarium Romanum is a Catholic liturgical book which may be considered as an appendix to the Roman Breviary.
- The Pontificale Romanum is the Roman Catholic liturgical book that contains the rites performed by bishops.
- The Rituale Romanum is one of the official ritual works of the Roman Catholic rite.

== Places ==
- Romanum (island), Micronesia
