= Akhmim =

Akhmim ϣⲙⲓⲛ أخميم
- City
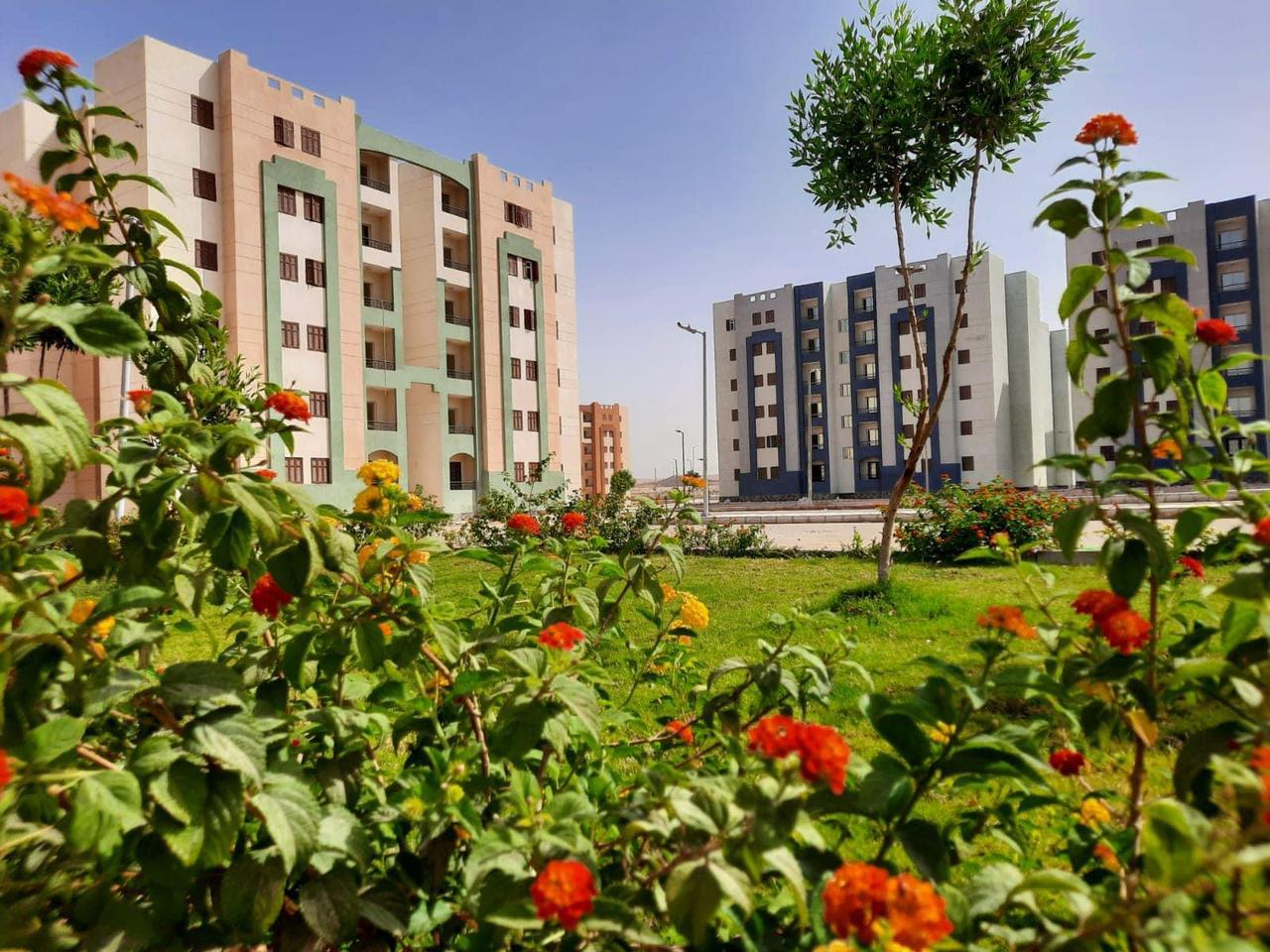
- Residential area in the city

- Location within Egypt
- Coordinates: 26°34′N 31°45′E
- Country: Egypt
- Governorate: Sohag

Area
  - Total: 14.7 km^{2} (5.7 sq mi)
- Elevation: 85 m (279 ft)

Population (2023)
  - Total: 157,938
  - Density: 10,700/km^{2} (27,800/sq mi)
- Time zone: UTC+2 (EET)
  - Summer (DST): UTC+3 (EEST)

Akhmim (Arabic: أخميم, pronounced [ʔæxˈmiːm]; Akhmimic Coptic: ⳉⲙⲓⲙ, Coptic pronunciation: [xmiːm]; Sahidic/Bohairic Coptic: ϣⲙⲓⲛ Coptic pronunciation: [ʃmiːn]) is a city in the Sohag Governorate of Upper Egypt. Referred to by the ancient Greeks as Khemmis or Chemmis (Ancient Greek: Χέμμις) and Panopolis (Ancient Greek: Πανὸς πόλις and Πανόπολις), it is located on the east bank of the Nile, 6 kilometres (4 mi) to the northeast of Sohag.

== History ==
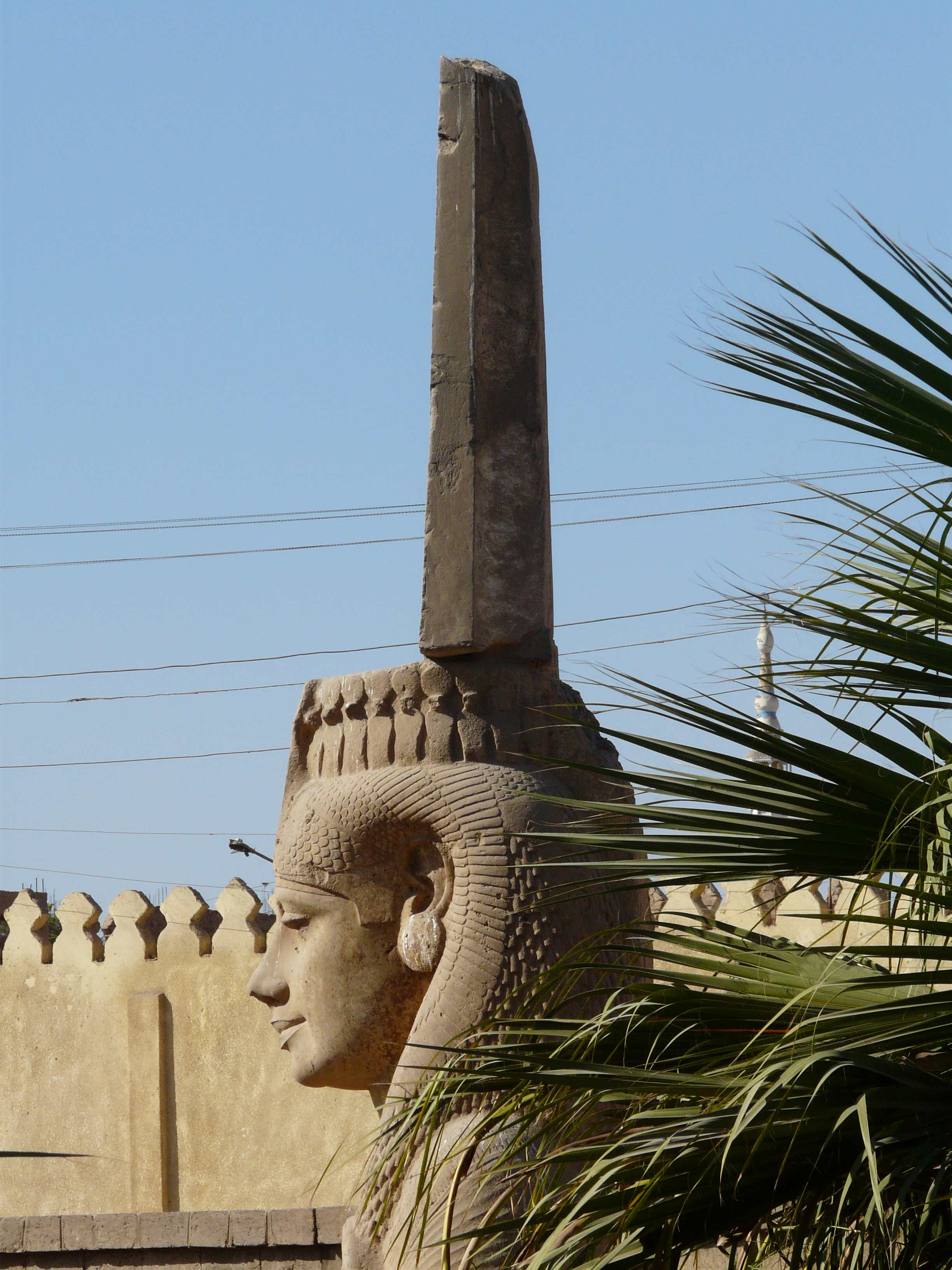
Statue of Meritamen, a daughter of Ramesses II, in the temple of Min

i p niwt or i p w niwt
jp or jpw
in hieroglyphs
Era: New Kingdom
(1550–1069 BC)

W18 n t x xm Aa15 niwt
ḫn(t) mnw
in hieroglyphs
Era: New Kingdom
(1550–1069 BC)

Akhmim was known in Ancient Egypt as Ipu, Apu (according to Brugsch the name is related to the nearby village of Kafr Abou) or Khent-min. It was the capital of the ninth (Chemmite) nome of Upper Egypt.

The city is a suggested hometown for Yuya, the official of Tuthmosis IV and Amenhotep III.

The ithyphallic god Min (whom the Greeks identified with Pan) was worshipped here as "the strong Horus." Herodotus mentions the temple dedicated to Perseus and asserts that Chemmis was remarkable for being the hero’s birthplace, wherein celebrations and games were held in his honour after the manner of the Greeks; at which prizes were given. As a matter of fact, some representations are known of Nubians and people of Punt (southern coastal Sudan and the Eritrean coast) climbing up poles before the god Min.

Min was especially a god of the desert routes on the east of Egypt, and the trading tribes are likely to have gathered at his festivals for business and pleasure at Coptos (which was really near Neapolis) even more than at Akhmim. Herodotus perhaps confused Coptos with Chemmis. Strabo mentions linen-weaving and stone-cutting as ancient industries of Panopolis, and it is not altogether a coincidence that the cemetery of Akhmim is one of the chief sources of the beautiful textiles of the Roman and Christian ages, that are brought from Egypt.

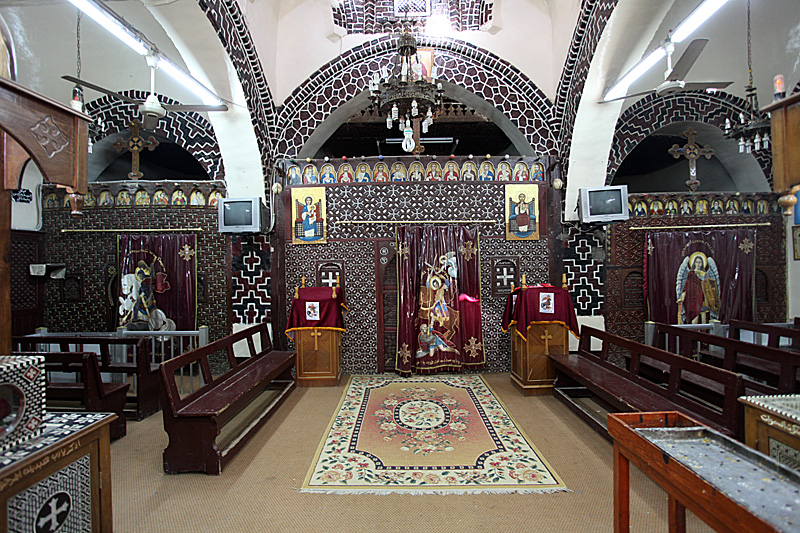
Church of Abu Seifein

In the Christian Coptic era, Akhmim was written in Sahidic Coptic: ϣⲙⲓⲛ/ⲭⲙⲓⲛ/ⲭⲙⲓⲙ Shmin/Kmin/Kmim but was probably pronounced locally something like Khmin or Khmim. Monasteries abounded in this region from a very early date.

Pachomius the Great founded a monastery known as Tkahshmin in the area. Shenouda the Archimandrite (348–466) was a monk at Athribis near Akhmim. Some years earlier Nestorius, the exiled ex-patriarch of Constantinople, had died at an old age in the neighborhood of Akhmim. Nonnus, the Greek poet, was born at Panopolis at the end of the 4th century. The bishopric of Panopolis, a suffragan of Antinoë in Thebais Prima, is included in the Catholic Church's list of titular sees. Among the bishops of Panopolis, Le Quien mentions Arius, a friend of Saint Pachomius who had built three convents in the city, Sabinus, and Menas. Excavations at Akhmim have disclosed numerous Christian manuscripts, among them fragments of the Book of Henoch, of the Gospel, and of the Apocalypse of Peter, the Acts of the Council of Ephesus, as well as numerous other Christian inscriptions.

In the 13th century AD, a very imposing temple still stood in Akhmim. Today, little of its past glory remains. Nothing is left of the town, the temples were almost completely dismantled, and their material was reused in the later Middle Ages. The extensive cemeteries of ancient Akhmim are yet to be fully explored. The destroyed corner of a Greco-Roman period temple with colossal statues of Ramesses II and Meritamen was discovered in 1981.

Of Akhmim, in 1818 Jacques Collin de Plancy wrote in his book, the Dictionnaire Infernal, that the city "formerly had the reputation of being the abode of the greatest magicians. Paul Lucas speaks, in his second voyage, of the marvelous serpent of Akhmin, which Muslims honor as an angel, and which Christians believe to be the demon Asmodeus."

== Climate ==
Köppen-Geiger climate classification system classifies its climate as hot desert (BWh).

Climate data for Akhmim
Month	Jan	Feb	Mar	Apr	May	Jun	Jul	Aug	Sep	Oct	Nov	Dec	Year
Mean daily maximum °C (°F)	22.1 (71.8)	24 (75)	27.9 (82.2)	33 (91)	36.1 (97.0)	37.9 (100.2)	37.2 (99.0)	37.4 (99.3)	34.2 (93.6)	31.9 (89.4)	28.4 (83.1)	23.4 (74.1)	31.1 (88.0)
Daily mean °C (°F)	13.6 (56.5)	15.1 (59.2)	18.5 (65.3)	23.4 (74.1)	27 (81)	29.2 (84.6)	28.9 (84.0)	29.3 (84.7)	27.2 (81.0)	24.9 (76.8)	20.3 (68.5)	15.2 (59.4)	22.7 (72.9)
Mean daily minimum °C (°F)	5.2 (41.4)	6.2 (43.2)	9.2 (48.6)	13.8 (56.8)	18 (64)	20.5 (68.9)	20.7 (69.3)	21.3 (70.3)	20.2 (68.4)	17.9 (64.2)	12.3 (54.1)	7.1 (44.8)	14.4 (57.8)
Average precipitation mm (inches)	0 (0)	0 (0)	0 (0)	0 (0)	0 (0)	0 (0)	0 (0)	0 (0)	0 (0)	0 (0)	0 (0)	0 (0)	0 (0)
Source: Climate-Data.org

== Modern city ==
Akhmim is the largest town on the east side of the Nile in Sohag Governorate. In 1907, the population of the city was 23,795, of whom about one third were Copts. Akhmim has several mosques and two Coptic churches. The Monastery of the Martyrs is located about 6 km northeast of the city. Akhmim maintains a weekly market, and manufactures cotton goods, notably the blue shirts and check shawls with silk fringes worn by the poorer classes of Egypt. Outside the walls are the scanty ruins of two ancient temples. On the west bank of the Nile opposite of Akhmim, there is railway communication with Cairo and Aswan.

== Notable people ==
- Nakhtmin, 13th Dynasty priest
- Yuya and Tjuyu, parents of Queen Tiye, Anen and possibly Pharaoh Ay
- Tiye (c. 1398 BC – 1338 BC), Great Royal Wife of the Egyptian pharaoh Amenhotep III
- Anen, Second Prophet of Amun and brother of Queen Tiye
- Ay, Pharaoh from 1323 to 1319 BC or 1327–1323 BC
- Nakhtmin, general, appointed heir of Ay
- Sennedjem, official under Tutankhamun
- Amenemope, author of Instructions of Amenemope
- Nefrina, woman who died in 275 BCE, her mummy is in the Reading Public Museum, Pennsylvania
- Zosimos of Panopolis, 3rd/4th century alchemist
- Tryphiodorus, 3rd/4th century epic poet
- Cyrus of Panopolis, (Flavius Taurus Seleucus Cyrus; fl. 426–441) East Roman official, philosopher, poet
- Pamprepius (440–484) philosopher, poet, rebel against Emperor Zeno
- Abib and Apollo, 4th century martyrs
- Nonnus, 5th century poet
- Veronica of Syria, 8th century nun, martyr
- Dhul-Nun al-Misri, 9th century Sufi saint
- Muhammed ibn Umail al-Tamimi (900–960) alchemist
- Bahram al-Armani Fatimid vizier (1135–1137) was exiled here
- Al-Nuwayri (1279–1333) Arab historian, encyclopedist
- Yousab El Abah (1735–1826), bishop of Akhmim, theologian, saint
- Maximos Sedfaoui (1863–1925), Apostolic Administrator of the Coptic Catholic Church
- Markos II Khouzam (1888–1958), Patriarch of Alexandria (1947–1958)

== See also ==
- List of cities and towns in Egypt
- Berlin Codex
- el-Hawawish
- el-Salamuni
