= Liturgy =

Customary public worship performed by a religious group

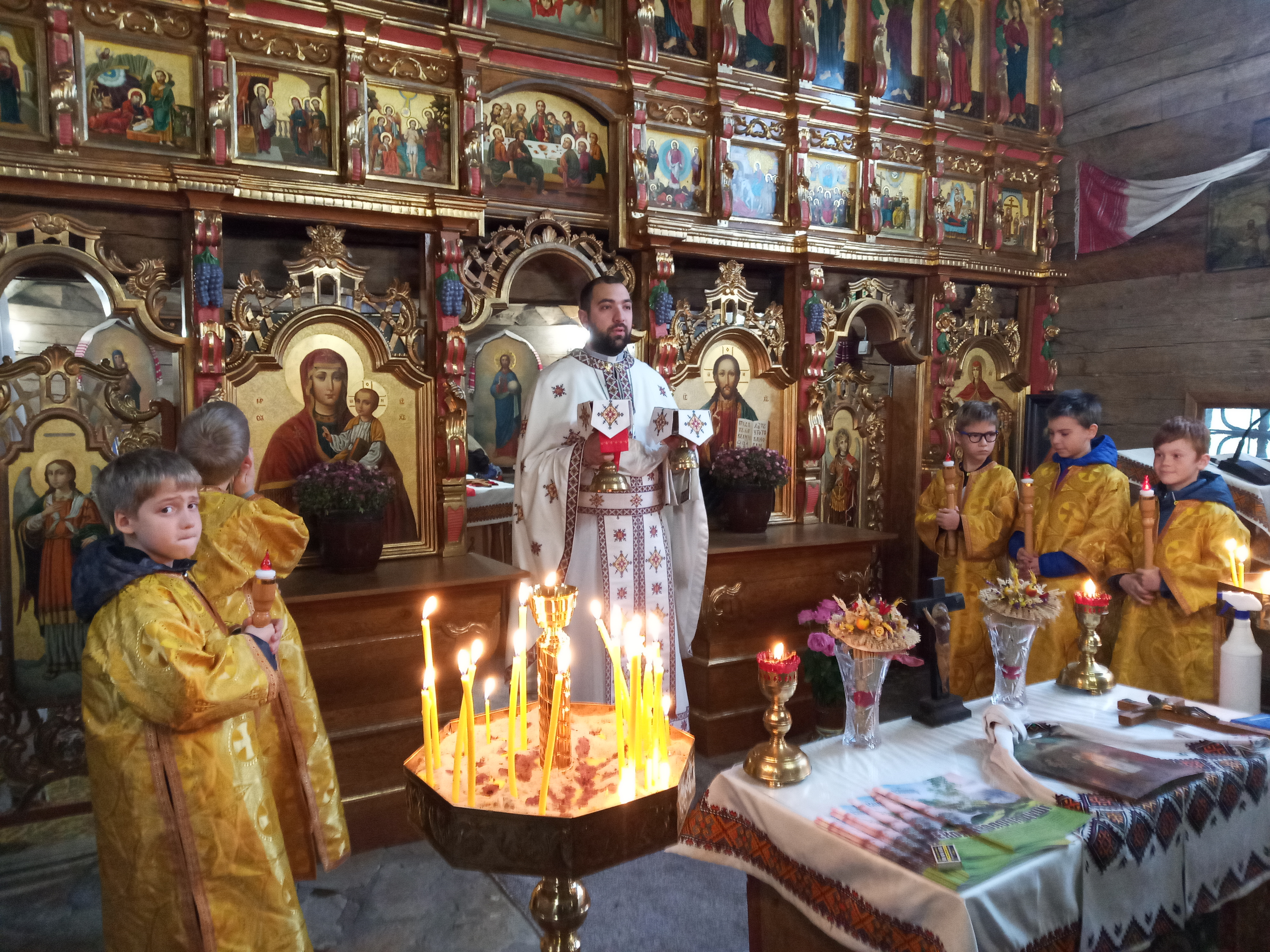
Divine Liturgy as celebrated (along with the Eucharist) under the Byzantine Rite in the Ukrainian Greek Catholic Church

Liturgy is the customary public ritual of worship performed by a religious group. As a religious phenomenon, liturgy represents a communal response to and participation in the sacred through activities reflecting praise, thanksgiving, remembrance, supplication, or repentance. It forms a basis for establishing a relationship with God or the divine.

Technically speaking, liturgy forms a subset of ritual. The word liturgy, sometimes equated in English as "service", refers to a formal ritual enacted by those who understand themselves to be participating in an action with the divine.

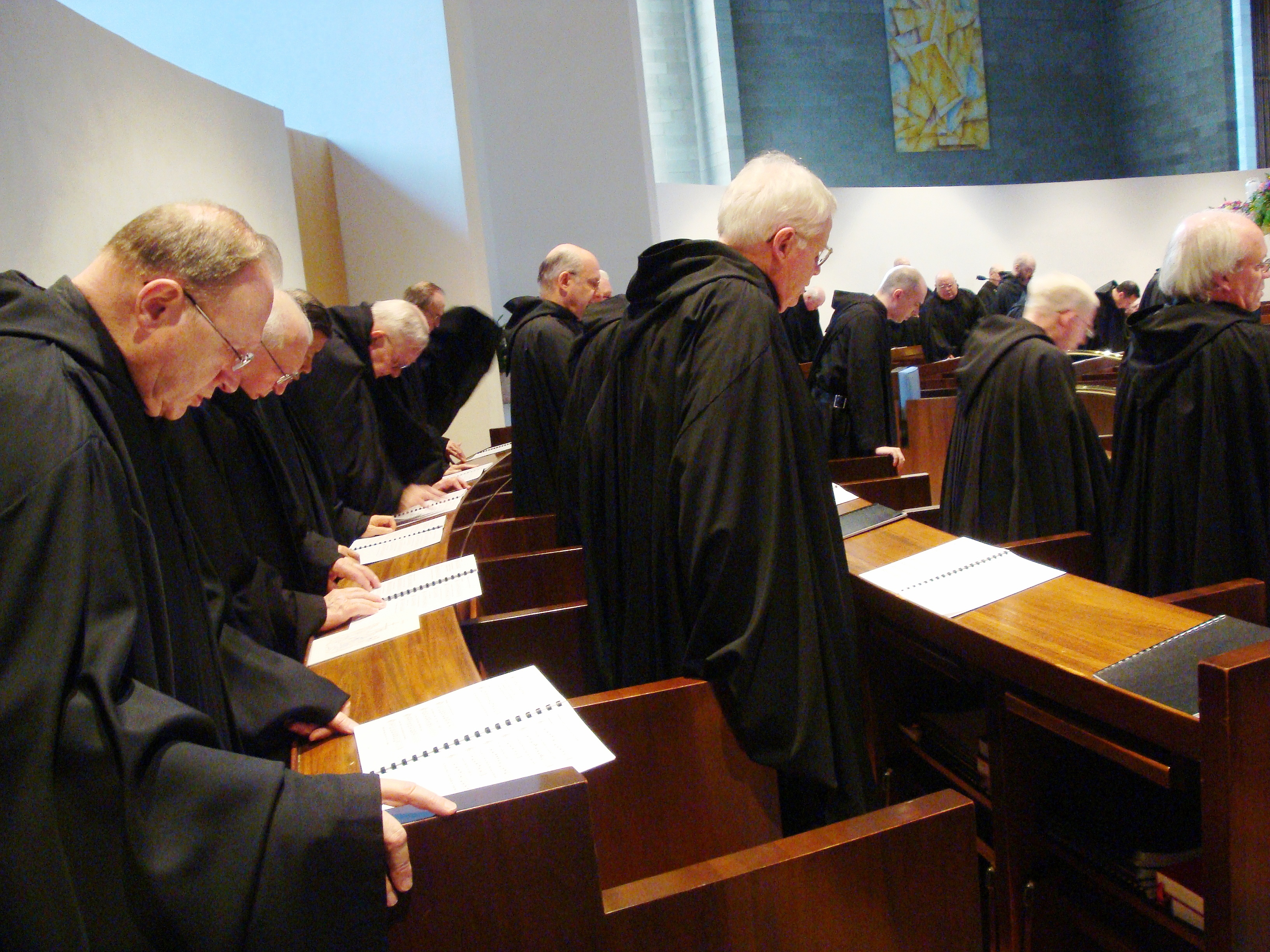
Benedictine Monks praying the Liturgy of the Hours

== Etymology ==
The word liturgy (/lɪtərdʒi/), derived from the technical term in ancient Greek (Greek: λειτουργία), leitourgia, which means "work or service for the people" is a literal translation of the two affixes λήϊτος, "leitos", derived from the Attic form of λαός ("people, public"), and ἔργον, "ergon", meaning "work, service".

In origin, it signified the often expensive offerings wealthy Greeks made in service to the people, and thus to the polis and the state. Through the leitourgia, the rich carried a financial burden and were correspondingly rewarded with honours and prestige. Specific leitourgia were assigned by the polis, the State, and during Rome's domination, the Roman Imperial authorities as "gifts" to the state and the people. Their performance became obligatory in the course of the 3rd century AD, as a form of taxation. The holder of a Hellenic leitourgia was not taxed a specific sum, but was assigned to subsidise a particular ritual, which could be performed with greater or lesser generosity or magnificence. The chief sphere remained that of civic religion, embodied in the festivals: M.I. Finley notes "in Demosthenes' day there were at least 97 liturgical appointments in Athens for the festivals, rising to 118 in a (quadrennial) Panathenaic year." Groups of rich citizens were assigned to subsidise civic amenities and even warships. Eventually, under the Roman Empire, such obligations, known to Romans as munera, devolved into a competitive and ruinously expensive burden that was avoided when possible. Munera included a wide range of expenses having to do with civic infrastructure and amenities; festivals and games (ludi) and imperial obligations such as highway, bridge and aqueduct repair, supply of various raw materials, and feeding troops in transit.

== Buddhism ==
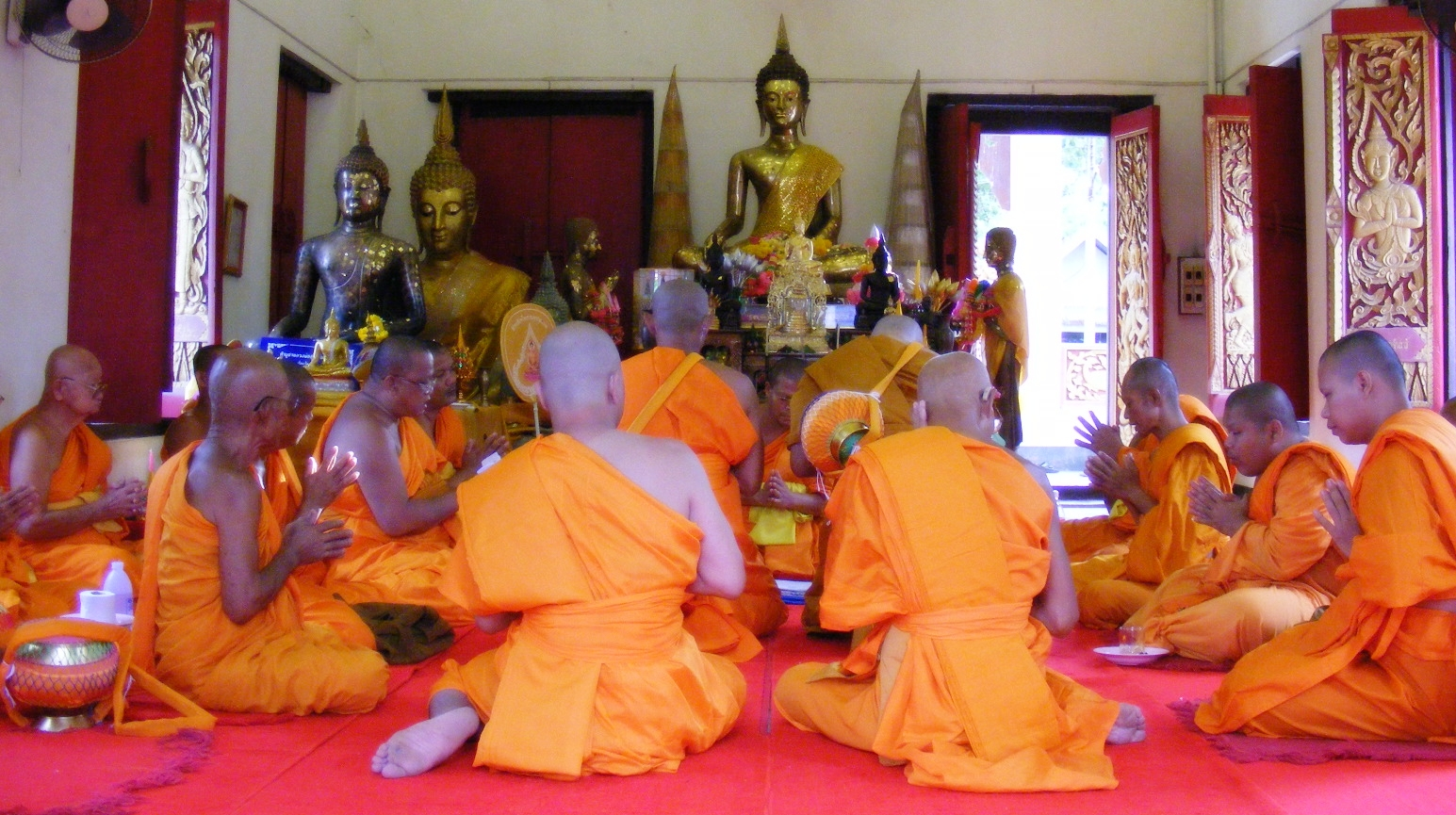
Buddhist liturgy

Buddhist liturgy is a formalized service of veneration and worship performed within a Buddhist Sangha in nearly every traditional denomination and sect in the Buddhist world. It is often done one or more times a day and can vary among the Theravada, Mahayana, and Vajrayana sects.

The liturgy mainly consists of chanting or reciting a sutra or passages from a sutras, a mantra (especially in Vajrayana), and several gathas. Depending on what practice the practitioner wishes to undertake, it can be done at a temple or at home. The liturgy is almost always performed in front of an object or objects of veneration and accompanied by offerings of light, incense, water, and food.

== Christianity ==
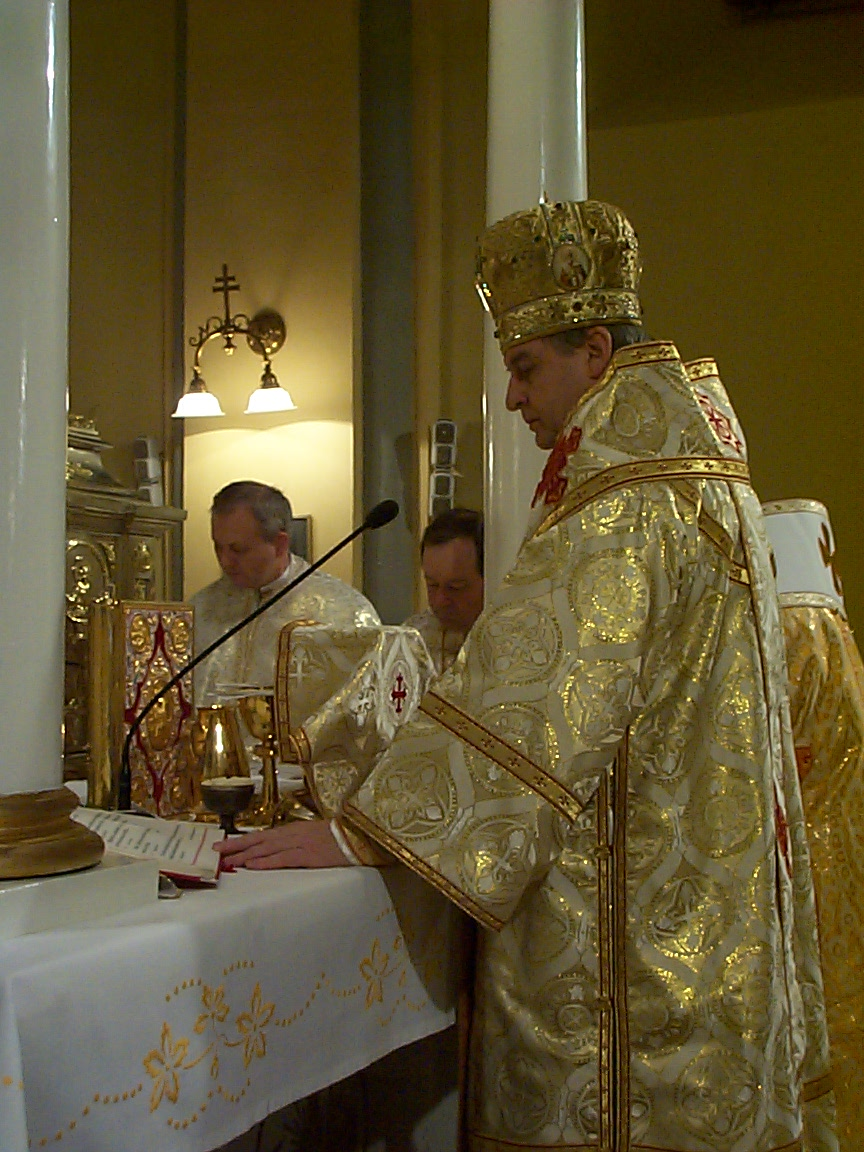
A bishop celebrating the Divine Liturgy in an Eastern Catholic Church in Prešov, Slovakia

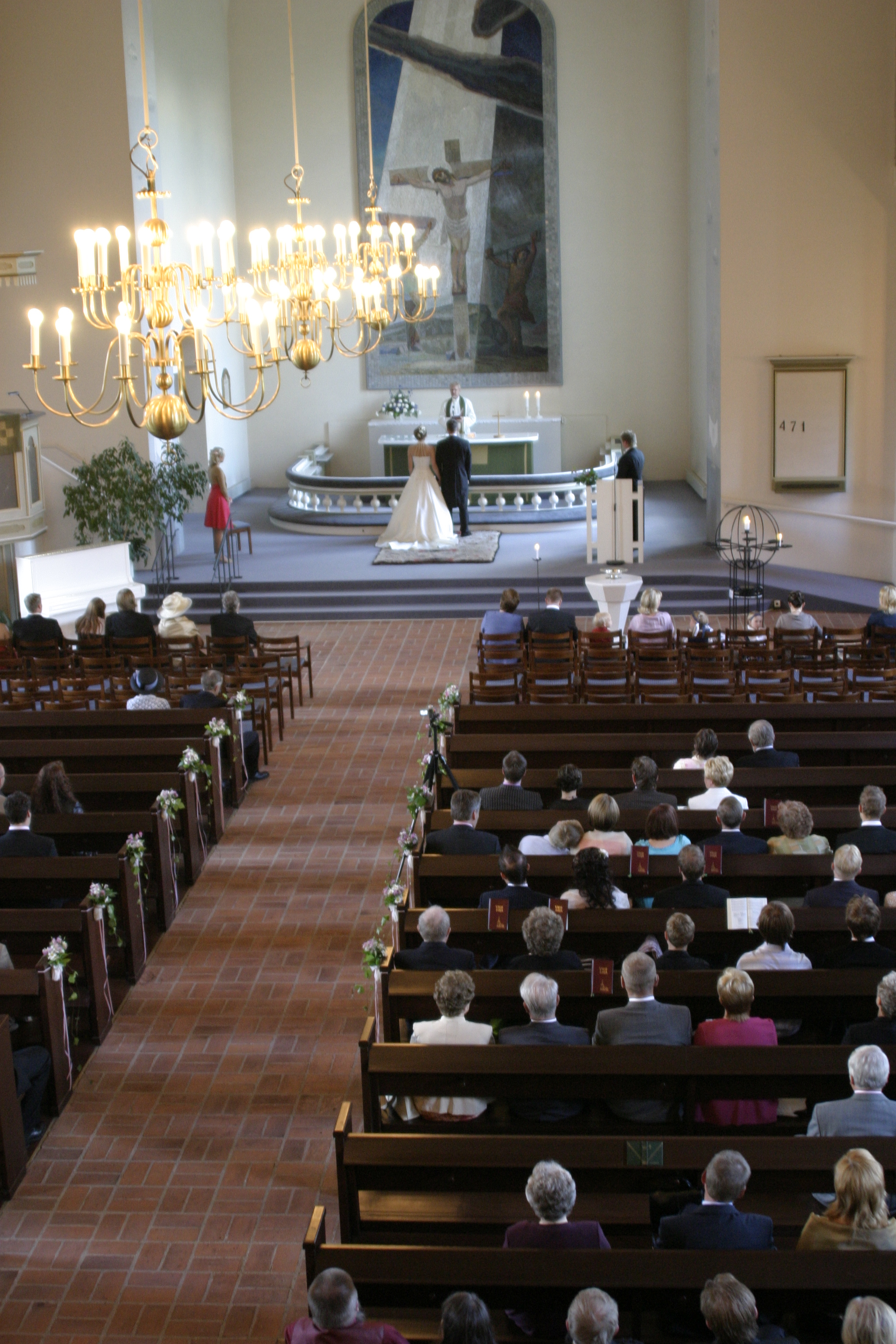
Wedding ceremony inside the Kiuruvesi Church in Kiuruvesi, Finland

Frequently in Christianity, a distinction is made between "liturgical" and "non-liturgical" churches based on how elaborate or formal the worship; in this usage, churches whose services are unscripted or improvised are called "non-liturgical". Others object to this distinction, arguing that this terminology obscures the universality of public worship as a religious phenomenon. Thus, even the open or waiting worship of Quakers is liturgical, since the waiting itself until the Holy Spirit moves individuals to speak is a prescribed form of Quaker worship, sometimes referred to as "the liturgy of silence". Typically in Christianity, however, the term "the liturgy" normally refers to a standardised order of events observed during a religious service, be it a sacramental service or a service of public prayer; usually the former is the referent. In the ancient tradition, sacramental liturgy especially is the participation of the people in the work of God, which is primarily the saving work of Jesus Christ; in this liturgy, Christ continues the work of redemption.

The term "liturgy" in Greek literally means to "work for the people", but a better translation is "public service" or "public work", as made clear from the origin of the term as described above. The early Christians adopted the word to describe their principal act of worship, the Sunday service (referred to by various terms, including Holy Eucharist, Holy Communion, Mass or Divine Liturgy), which they considered to be a sacrifice. This service, liturgy, or ministry (from the Latin "ministerium") is a duty for Christians as a priestly people by their baptism into Christ and participation in His high priestly ministry. It is also God's ministry or service to the worshippers. It is a reciprocal service. Historically, there was a Christian thought that stresses the idea of the entire liturgy being needed to transform the bread and wine into Eucharistic elements (see Eucharist). This may have been prevalent especially in Egypt. Usually, many Christian churches designate one person who participates in the worship service as the liturgist. The liturgist may read announcements, scriptures, and calls to worship, while the minister preaches the sermon, offers prayers, and blesses sacraments. The liturgist may be either an ordained minister or a lay person. The entire congregation participates in and offers the liturgy to God.

== Islam ==
Salāt ("prayer", Arabic: صلاة ṣalāh or gen: ṣalāt; pl. صلوات ṣalawāt) is the practice of physical and compulsory prayer in Islam as opposed to dua, which is the Arabic word for supplication. Its importance for Muslims is indicated by its status as one of the Five Pillars of Islam.

Salat is preceded by ritual ablution and usually performed five times a day. It consists of the repetition of a unit called a rakʿah (pl. rakaʿāt) consisting of prescribed actions and words. The number of obligatory (fard) rakaʿāt varies from two to four according to the time of day or other circumstances (such as Friday congregational worship, which has two rakats). Prayer is obligatory for all Muslims except those who are prepubescent, menstruating, or in puerperium stage after childbirth.

== Judaism ==
Jewish liturgy is the prayer recitations that form part of the observance of Rabbinic Judaism. These prayers, often with instructions and commentary, are found in the siddur, the traditional Jewish prayer book. In general, Jewish men are obligated to pray three times a day within specific time ranges (zmanim), while, according most modern Orthodox authorities, women are only required to pray once daily, as they are generally exempted from obligations that are time dependent. All communal prayer requires a minyan, a quorum of 10 adults, to be present.

Traditionally, three prayer services are recited daily:

1. Shacharit or Shaharit (שַחֲרִית), from the Hebrew shachar or shahar (שַחָר) "morning light",
2. Mincha or Minha (מִנְחָה), the afternoon prayers named for the flour offering that accompanied sacrifices at the Temple in Jerusalem,
3. Arvit (עַרְבִית) or Maariv (מַעֲרִיב), from "nightfall".

Additional prayers:

- Musaf (מוּסָף, "additional") is traditionally recited on Shabbat, major Jewish holidays (including Chol HaMoed), and Rosh Chodesh.
- A fifth prayer service, Ne'ila (נְעִילָה, "closing"), is recited only on Yom Kippur, the Day of Atonement.

== See also ==
- Book of Common Prayer
- The Book of Common Worship of 1993
- Liturgical book
- Catholic liturgy
- Divine Liturgy
- Divine Service (Eastern Orthodoxy)
- Divine Service (Lutheran)
- Eastern Catholic liturgy
- Kesh temple hymn (Liturgy to Nintud) — Sumerian clayen tablet written as early as 2600 BC
- Liturgical year
- Protestant liturgy
- Sacrament
- Seokjeon Daeje
- Siddur
