= Saint Febronia =

Saint Febronia may refer to:

- Saint Febronia of Nisibis, was a nun at Nisibis, Assyria.
- Saint Febronia of Syria, was a nun and Virgin-Martyr saint.
