= Pola Akhnoukh =

Egyptian Coptic Catholic bishop (born 1971)

His Excellency, The Most Reverend Pola Ayoub Matta Usama Shafik Akhnoukh
- Bishop of Ismaylia
- Church: Coptic Catholic Church
- Province: Alexandria
- Diocese: Ismaylia
- Appointed: 31 March 2023
- Predecessor: Daniel Lotfy Khella
- Other posts: Apostolic Visitor for the Coptic Faithful in the United States and Canada (2023–present)

Orders
- Ordination: 27 June 2002 by Kyrillos William
- Consecration: 11 May 2023 by Ibrahim Isaac Sidrak

Personal details
- Born: Ayoub Matta Usama Shafik Akhnoukh; 19 February 1971 (age 55) Asyut, Egypt
- Residence: Ismailia, Egypt
- Education: Assiut University, St. Leo the Great Patriarchal Seminary in Maadi

Pola Ayoub Matta Usama Shafik Akhnoukh (born 19 February 1971) is an Egyptian Coptic Catholic hierarch who has served as the Bishop of Ismaylia since 2023. Additionally, he serves as the Apostolic Visitor for the Coptic Catholic faithful in the United States and Canada.

== Biography ==
=== Early life and priesthood ===
Pola Ayoub Matta Usama Shafik Akhnoukh was born on 19 February 1971 in Asyut, Egypt. He obtained a bachelor's degree from the Faculty of Arts at Assiut University. Following his secular education, he began his ecclesiastical formulation at the St. Leo the Great Patriarchal Seminary in Maadi, Cairo, where he completed his studies in philosophy and theology. He was ordained a priest on 27 June 2002 for the Eparchy of Asyut by Bishop Kyrillos William.

During his priesthood, Akhnoukh engaged in pastoral care, administration, and community outreach, serving as the pastor of the Cathedral of the Divine Motherhood in Assiut. His pastoral responsibilities also extended abroad to serve the Coptic diaspora communities; he spent time in ministry in Melbourne and Sydney, Australia, where he obtained an Australian citizenship.

=== Episcopacy ===
Following his election by the Synod of Bishops of the Coptic Catholic Church, Pope Francis confirmed his appointment as the Bishop of the Eparchy of Ismaylia on 31 March 2023, succeeding Daniel Lotfy Khella. He received his episcopal consecration on 11 May 2023 at the Cathedral of Saint Mark in Ismailia. The principal consecrator was Patriarch Ibrahim Isaac Sidrak, the Coptic Catholic Patriarch of Alexandria, assisted by several co-consecrators from the other Catholic Churches sui iuris.

On 16 December 2023, Pope Francis appointed Akhnoukh as the Apostolic Visitor for the Coptic Catholic faithful residing in the United States and Canada, tasked with overseeing the spiritual care and ecclesial organization of the diaspora communities across North America.
