= Eparchy of Ismaylia =

Coptic Catholic eparchy in Egypt

Eparchy of Ismaylia Eparchia Ismailiensis

Location
- Territory: Ismailia, Port Said, Suez, Sinai, and Sharqia
- Metropolitan: Patriarchate of Alexandria

Statistics
- Population: 10,000 (2024)
- Parishes: 16 (2024)

Information
- Sui iuris church: Coptic Catholic Church
- Rite: Alexandrian Rite
- Established: 17 December 1982
- Cathedral: Cathedral of Saint Mark, Ismailia

Current leadership
- Eparch: Pola Akhnoukh
- Bishops emeritus: Makarios Tewfik

Map
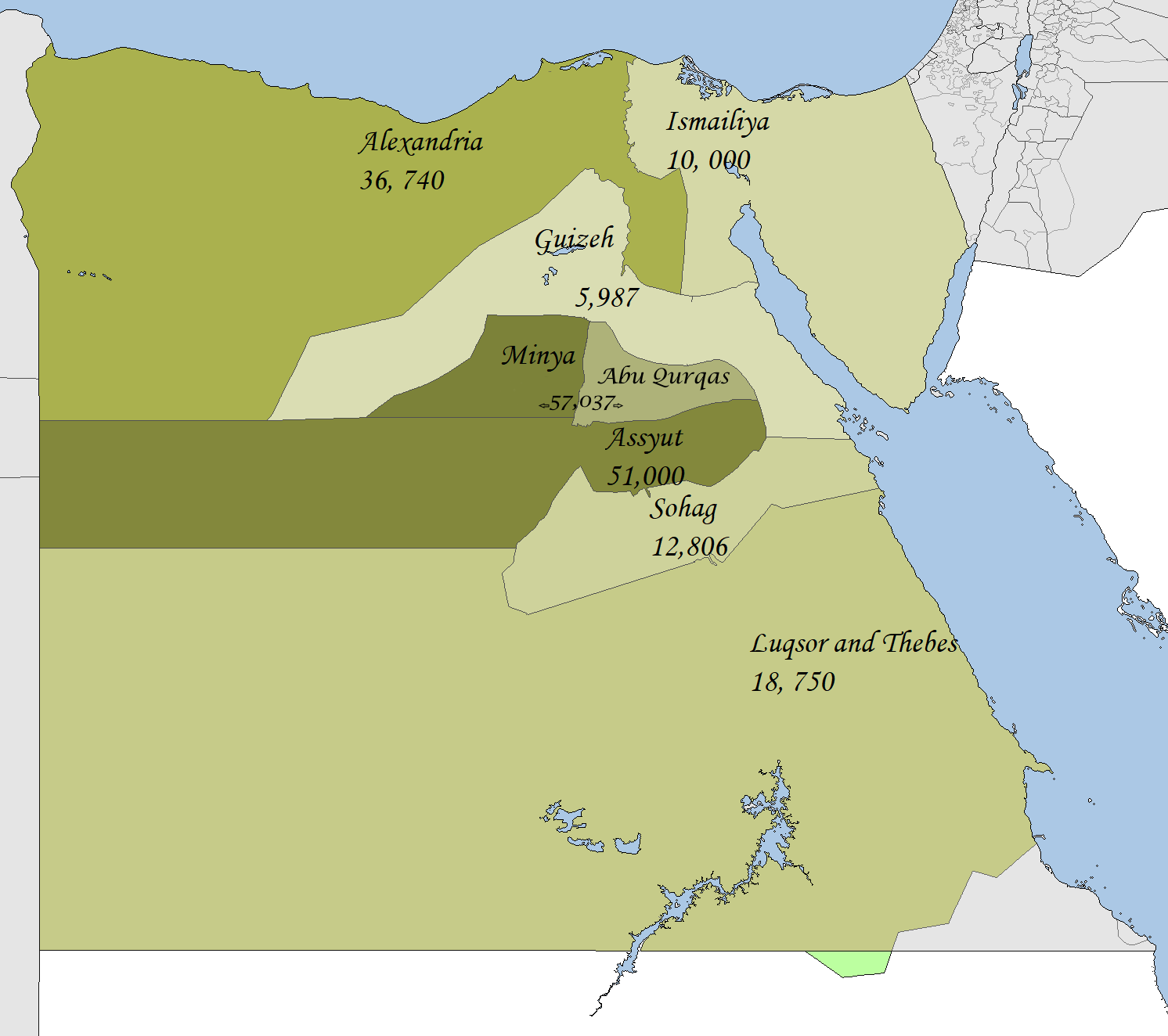

The Coptic Catholic Eparchy of Ismaylia (Latin: Eparchia Ismailiensis) is a suffragan eparchy (Eastern Catholic diocese) of the Coptic Catholic Church, an Eastern Catholic Church in full communion with the Holy See (the Catholic Church).

Centered in the city of Ismailia, the eparchy's jurisdiction extends across the Canal Zone (Ismailia, Port Said, and Suez), the Sinai Peninsula, and the Sharqia Governorate. It operates under the Alexandrian Rite and is a suffragan see of the Coptic Catholic Patriarchate of Alexandria.

== History ==
The eparchy was erected on 17 December 1982 by Pope John Paul II, carved out of territory formerly belonging to the Coptic Catholic Eparchy of Alexandria. At its inception, the eparchy assumed responsibility for pastoral care in the rapidly growing Canal Zone and Sinai regions.

The first eparch was Youhanna Golta, who served as a patriarchal vicar until Athanasios Abadir was appointed as the first resident ordinary in 1983. Over the decades, the eparchy established numerous educational, medical, and charitable services, establishing a network of schools and clinics open to both Christian and Muslim populations in the region.

== Eparchial Bishops ==
- Athanasios Abadir (17 December 1982 – 25 May 1992)
- Youhannes Ezzat Zakaria Badir (23 November 1992 – 23 June 1994)
- Makarios Tewfik (23 June 1994 – 14 June 2019)
- Daniel Lotfy Khella (29 June 2019 – 23 September 2022)
  - Daniel Lotfy Khella (23 September 2022 – 31 March 2023), Patriarchal Administrator
- Pola Akhnoukh (since 31 March 2023 – Present)

== Statistics ==
The eparchy encompasses approximately 16 parishes and serves an estimated 10,000 Coptic Catholic faithful. It is served by diocesan and religious priests, alongside various orders of religious sisters who manage local schools, orphanages, and charitable centers.
