= Stéphanos I Sidarouss =

Head of the Coptic Catholic Church from 1958 to 1986

His Beatitude and Eminence Stéphanos I Sidarouss إسطفانوس الأول سيداروس CM
- Cardinal Patriarch of Alexandria
- Sidarouss attending the second Vatican council.
- Church: Coptic Catholic Church
- See: Alexandria
- Appointed: 10 May 1958
- Term ended: 24 May 1986
- Predecessor: Markos II Khouzam
- Successor: Stéphanos II Ghattas
- Previous posts: Auxiliary Bishop of Alexandria (1947–1958); Titular Bishop of Sais (1947–1958)

Orders
- Ordination: 22 July 1939
- Consecration: 25 January 1948 by Markos II Khouzam
- Created cardinal: 22 February 1965 by Pope Paul VI
- Rank: Cardinal-Bishop Patriarch

Personal details
- Born: Stéphanos Sidarouss; 22 February 1904 Cairo, Egypt
- Died: 23 August 1987 (aged 83) Cairo, Egypt
- Denomination: Coptic Catholic Church
- Coat of arms

Styles of Stéphanos I Sidarouss
- Reference style: His Eminence
- Spoken style: Your Eminence
- Religious style: His Holiness
- Informal style: Cardinal

Stéphanos I Sidarouss CM (Arabic: إسطفانوس الأول سيداروس) (22 February 1904 – 23 August 1987) was an Egyptian patriarch of the Coptic Catholic Church, an Eastern Catholic sui juris particular church. He served as Patriarch of Alexandria from 1958 to 1986, and was elevated to the cardinalate in 1965.

== Biography ==
Stéphanos I Sidarouss was born in Cairo, and later entered the Congregation of the Mission, more commonly known as the Lazarists. He was educated at houses of studies belonging to this religious institute in France, where he was ordained to the priesthood on 22 July 1939, in Dax. Sidarouss then taught at the seminary of Évreux and at the scholasticates of Dax and Montmagny until 1946. From 1946 to 1947, he was director of the Ecclesiastical Institute of Catholic Copts in Tantah, Egypt.

On 9 August 1947, Sidarouss was elected Auxiliary Bishop of the Eparchy of Alexandria and Titular Bishop of Sais. He received his episcopal consecration on 25 January 1948 from Patriarch Markos II Khouzam, with Bishops Alexandros Scandar and Pierre Dib serving as co-consecrators. Sidarouss was later elected Patriarch of Alexandria, and thus primate of the Coptic Catholic Church, on 10 May 1958, and attended the Second Vatican Council from 1962 to 1965.

Pope Paul VI created him a Cardinal Bishop in the consistory of 22 February 1965, which happened to be his sixty-first birthday. As an Eastern Catholic Patriarch, Sidarouss did not assume a titular church of Rome upon his elevation to the College of Cardinals. This was done pursuant to Pope Paul VI's motu propio Ad Purpuratorum Patrum issued only eleven days earlier on 11 February 1965 which decreed that Eastern Patriarchs who are elevated to the College of Cardinals would belong to the order of cardinal-bishops, ranked after the suburbicarian cardinal-bishops, but would not be part of the Roman clergy and would not be assigned any Roman suburbicarian diocese, church or deaconry, their patriarchal see instead becoming their cardinalatial see.

At the Synod of Bishops in 1971, the patriarch expressed his opinion that the Latin Church would be unwise to ordain non-celibate men, believing married priests may become too absorbed with family matters.

The Patriarch was one of the cardinal electors who participated in the conclaves of August and October 1978, which selected Popes John Paul I and John Paul II respectively. At the conclusion of both conclaves, Patriarch Sidarouss was one of the few cardinals in the central balcony of St. Peter's Basilica accompanying the new popes when they first made their appearances to the public on August and October respectively. Patriarch Sidarouss was the first Coptic Catholic Patriarch to participate in a papal conclave since the establishment of the patriarchate in 1824. He lost the right to participate in any future conclaves upon reaching the age of eighty on 22 February 1984, and resigned the patriarchate on 24 May 1986, after twenty-eight years of service.

Cardinal Sidarouss later died in his native Cairo, at age 83.

== See also ==
- List of Coptic Catholic Patriarchs of Alexandria

Catholic Church titles
Preceded by Markos II Khouzam	Coptic Patriarch of Alexandria; 1958–1986	Succeeded by Stéphanos II Ghattas
