= Emmanuel Bishay =

Egyptian Coptic Catholic bishop (born 1972)

The Most Reverend Emmanuel Bishay
- Bishop of Luxor
- Church: Coptic Catholic Church
- Province: Alexandria
- Diocese: Luxor
- Installed: 16 April 2016
- Predecessor: Youhannes Ezzat Zakaria Badir
- Other post: Apostolic Visitator for Coptic Catholics in Europe (since 2022)
- Previous post: Curial Official of the Dicastery for the Eastern Churches (2003–2016)

Orders
- Ordination: 25 September 1995 by Kyrillos William
- Consecration: 10 June 2016 by Ibrahim Isaac Sidrak

Personal details
- Born: Khaled Ayad Bishay; 5 January 1972 (age 54) Kom Gharib, Sohag Governorate, Egypt
- Residence: Luxor, Egypt
- Education: Pontifical Alphonsian Academy; Pontifical Oriental Institute

Emmanuel Bishay (born Khaled Ayad Bishay on 5 January 1972) is an Egyptian Coptic Catholic hierarch who has served as the Bishop of the Eparchy of Luxor since 2016. He concurrently serves as the Apostolic Visitator for Coptic Catholic faithful in Europe since 2022.

== Early life and education ==
Khaled Ayad Bishay was born on 5 January 1972 in the village of Kom Gharib, located within the Sohag Governorate of Egypt. After completing his primary and secondary education, he entered the St. Leo the Great Patriarchal Seminary in Maadi to study philosophy and theology.

He was ordained a priest on 25 September 1995 by Bishop Kyrillos William for the Eparchy of Sohag. Following his ordination, he pursued higher academic studies in Rome. He obtained a licentiate in moral theology from the Pontifical Alphonsian Academy and a subsequent licentiate in Eastern canon law from the Pontifical Oriental Institute.

== Pastoral ministry ==
After his return to Egypt, he served as professor of Moral Theology, member of the teaching team of the Major Seminary of Maadi, parish priest of the Cathedral of the Eparchy of Sohag. In 2003, he moved to Rome to serve as a staff official at the Congregation for the Oriental Churches in the Vatican. During his time in Europe, he also provided pastoral care to the diaspora Coptic Catholic community, serving as the chaplain for Coptic Catholics in Rome and celebrating liturgies for Coptic communities in Switzerland and other regions.

== Episcopate ==
On 16 April 2016, Pope Francis confirmed his election by the Synod of the Coptic Catholic Church as the Bishop of the Eparchy of Luxor, succeeding Youhannes Ezzat Zakaria Badir. Upon his election, he chose the episcopal name Emmanuel.

Bishay was consecrated as a bishop on 10 June 2016 at the Cathedral of St. Charles Borromeo in Luxor. The principal consecrator was Patriarch Ibrahim Isaac Sidrak, assisted by other bishops of the Coptic Catholic Synod, alongside numerous public and religious figures in Egypt.

As bishop, Bishay has been active in promoting interfaith dialogue and national unity in Egypt, frequently highlighting the shared cultural fabric between Egyptian Muslims and Christians, particularly in the face of sectarian tensions and terrorism.

On 30 September 2022, Pope Francis appointed Bishop Bishay as the Apostolic Visitator for Coptic Catholic faithful in Europe.
