= Liturgical books of the Presbyterian Church (USA) =

There have been several liturgical books used in the Presbyterian Church (USA). Presently, the primary liturgical book of the Presbyterian Church (USA) is The Book of Common Worship of 1993, published in cooperation with the Cumberland Presbyterian Church.

These books are not commonly used in the pews, but are resources for pastors in the preparation for Sunday worship, as well as for devotional use by church members and seminarians. Portions of these books are frequently found in the church bulletins, functioning as liturgical booklets in many Presbyterian churches.

== The Presbyterian Service Book and The Directory For Worship ==
American Presbyterians have both a directory for worship and a service book. There is often a confusion over the distinction between the two, and over the role of each. A "Directory for Worship" is a part of the constitution of the church and thus has the authority of church law. It provides the theology that undergirds worship, and includes appropriate directions for worship. It sets forth the standards and the norms for the ordering of worship. It does have fixed orders of worship or liturgical texts.

The church's service book, on the other hand, provides orders and texts for worship. It is in harmony with the directory and is approved for voluntary use. Where both a directory and a service book coexist, as in those churches served by the Book of Common Worship (1993), the service book sets forth, in orders of services and in liturgical texts, the theology and norms described in the directory. Service books have a longer history in the Reformed tradition than directories, and most churches in the Reformed community do not have directories but do have service books.

== Service books of the 16th and 17th centuries ==
Reformed churches in the sixteenth century used service books. Ulrich Zwingli, Martin Bucer, and John Calvin all prepared worship forms for use in the congregations. John Knox, following Calvin, prepared The Forme of Prayers and subsequently a service book, the Book of Common Order, for use in Scotland. Liturgical forms were in general use in Switzerland, Germany, France, Italy, Holland, England, and Scotland.

However, the Reformation in England and Scotland after the death of Thomas Cranmer was formed in a very different context from that on the continent, where entire political entities were Reformed. The Reformed were thus able to prepare their own service books without interference. In England and Scotland those seeking to carry the reform from the continent had the difficult task of reforming within a state church hostile to Genevan-inspired reform. Even after the Scottish kirk was reformed under John Knox, it continued to endure English political and religious pressures, resulting in bitter conflict with the English crown.

As the contending party in a state church, the Puritans were vulnerable. The liberty of the church to order its life and worship in harmony with the Word of God was threatened. The Puritans felt under attack by both church and nation. It was in worship that the conflict raged. The Puritans’ struggle for liberty put them in direct conflict with those who had power to legislate the content of the service book and to require its use. Initially, the Puritan conflict was not about opposition to the propriety and use of a service book.

The Puritans proposed their own service books. Rather, the conflict was about a service book that was being imposed upon the Puritans that did not reflect their concerns. The struggle ultimately drove the Puritans to join forces with the separatists. As a result, both the English Puritans and the Scots were forced into a more radical liturgical position than that of the reform on the continent, which did not have to face such issues. Whereas the Reformers were in a position to reform the forms of worship, the political and ecclesiastical situation compelled the Puritans, for the sake of liberty, to reject the forms thrust upon them.

It was in this context that the Westminster Directory for the Publique Worship of God, devoid of liturgical text, was created in 1644, under the influence of Puritans and separatists. This directory was destined to play the dominant role in shaping the worship of American Presbyterians. It was at this moment in history that Puritans and Scots settled in the New World. They were the nucleus that initially shaped American Presbyterianism. Puritan views thus dominated the way the church took root in American soil. Opposition to service books continued even though the Puritans were no longer engaged in a struggle for liberty. The agenda remained, even though the context had changed.

In keeping with their Puritan legacy, Presbyterians who settled in the New World chose to be served by a directory for worship rather than a service book. Colonial Presbyterians had the 1644 Westminster Directory available to them until, in 1788, the Westminster Directory was revised for use in the United States and subsequently adopted by the first General Assembly. Two generations after the first General Assembly, things began to change.

== Service books in the 19th century ==
In the middle of the nineteenth century a movement emerged among American Presbyterians and other Reformed churches that sought to restore a liturgical tradition that was both Reformed and catholic, and thus to recover the values associated with use of a service book.

Individuals began to write service books for use by Presbyterians. Toward the end of the century, demand for such resources prompted the publishing house of the northern Presbyterians to produce collections of liturgical forms.

But it was the southern General Assembly that first extended official sanction to liturgical forms. In 1894 a directory for worship was adopted for use in the southern church that contained liturgical formulas, and liturgies for marriages and funerals were appended to it. Nine years later, the northern General Assembly was ready to respond positively to overtures calling for a book of services.

== Book of Common Worship (1906) ==
In 1903, in response to the growing expression of a need for worship forms, the northern General Assembly approved overtures calling for the preparation of a book of services. The Book of Common Worship of 1906 became the first liturgical book of the Presbyterian Church in the United States. It was the result of overtures from the Synod of New York and the Presbytery of Denver. Henry Van Dyke was the chairperson of the committee charged with the publication of the book. Although American Presbyterians had a directory for worship to guide them in liturgical matters, the approval of a service book gave official recognition to the value of liturgical orders and texts in shaping worship.

The book relied heavily on the liturgical reforms of the Church of Scotland and incorporated much of the liturgical tradition from the Episcopal Book of Common Prayer. It provided for celebrating Holy Communion and included liturgies for morning and evening worship services as well as ancient forms of Eucharistic prayers based on Eastern Orthodox liturgies. Prayers and texts were written for festivals and seasons of the liturgical year, which at the time of publication was not universally accepted in the Presbytery. Various orders were written for Baptism, Confirmation, Ordination, and other ordinances. For the first time, A Treasury of Prayers, a collection of ancient and contemporary prayers, was included. The prayers were drawn from within the Reformed tradition and from within the Church catholic. One such example was the use of the Prayer of St. John Chrysostom, a departure from the Reformed principles and a look into the pre-denominational period. Congregational participation was encouraged with the provision of responses and unison prayers. Finally, the book included an extensive selection from Psalms and Canticles; the latter's titles were given in Latin (Magnificat; Nunc Dimittis, Te Deum laudamus etc.), also a significant departure from the Reformed tradition.

Many Presbyterians were angered by what they felt was a loss of liberty in worship and criticized "canned prayers." In the General Assembly meeting to approve the book, one commissioner threw the book across the room and said, "Faugh! It smells of priestcraft." Another speaker responded, "This is not van Dyke's prayer book. It belongs to every member of the committee you appointed. It is not a liturgy. It's not a ritual. It does not contain 'canned' prayers. It contains great live prayers of our fathers. Are you going to tell the man who wants to use this book that he can't have it?"

Although not fully embraced, the 1906 edition paved the way for a continuing tradition of liberty in Presbyterian worship in America, balanced with written resources for worship.

== Book of Common Worship (1932 and 1946) ==
By 1928, the 1906 edition began to appear dated. Responding to popular demand, the General Assembly appointed a 1929 committee chaired by Van Dyke to revise the Book of Common Worship. The revised edition was published in 1932 as the second liturgical book of the church and an expanded version of the 1906 publication.

During the course of the committee's work, Van Dyke addressed the critics of the 1906 edition: "We can see no force in the thoughtless opposition of such a book which is represented by the rather irreverent phrase, 'canned prayers.' The Bible and the service books of Calvin, Knox and the other reformers, all contain written forms of prayer. All our hymns are written. Yet no one is foolish and crude enough to protest against 'canned praise.' The effectual fervent prayer of a righteous man is acceptable though it be written." Texts for additional festivals and seasons were added and rudimentary lectionary was included.

It is significant that the southern General Assembly approved it for use by its congregations, and when presented to the 1931 General Assembly, there were no speeches against 'canned prayers', and the book was unanimously approved. Van Dyke called The Book of Common Worship of 1932 "his last labor" of life before he died in 1933.

Several years later, the northern General Assembly established a permanent committee to monitor the liturgical needs of the church and to periodically propose revisions of the Book of Common Worship. This underscores the importance that the Office of the General Assembly gave to the service book at that time.

A thoroughgoing revision of the Book of Common Worship resulted in a third edition published in 1946. Those who prepared this book had the advantage of increasing ecumenical liturgical scholarship and of more knowledge about the worship of the Reformers. This edition of the service book provided for still greater congregational participation. It contained expanded resources for Sunday morning and Sunday evening worship and for the celebration of the Lord's Supper. The reading of scripture in worship was given emphasis by the addition of a complete two-year lectionary from the Church of Scotland's Book of Common Order, published in 1940. The liturgical year also received increased emphasis, with prayers included from the service books of other churches.

== The Worshipbook (1970) ==
In 1955 the northern General Assembly called for another revision. As the committee appointed to revise the Book of Common Worship began its work, it was confronted with the great disparity between the Directory for Worship and the Book of Common Worship. The committee reported back to the assembly that it could not proceed until a new directory was adopted to replace the existing one, which for the northern church had remained virtually unchanged since its adoption nearly one hundred and seventy years earlier.

The southern Presbyterians joined with the northern church to produce the new service book but decided to prepare their own directory. Also joining the project was the United Presbyterian Church of North America, which in 1947 had published a book entitled The Manual for Worship, which included general guidelines for worship with some orders and liturgical texts. Before the new service book was completed, the United Presbyterian Church of North America had merged with the Presbyterian Church in the U.S.A. to form the United Presbyterian Church in the U.S.A. The Cumberland Presbyterian Church also joined in the project to produce the new service book. The Cumberland Presbyterians later engaged in preparing a new Directory for Worship, which was approved by their General Assembly in 1984. Other Reformed churches participated in early phases of the development of a new Book of Common Worship.

Work resumed on a revised Book of Common Worship when in 1961 the United Presbyterian Church in the U.S.A., and in 1963 the Presbyterian Church in the U.S., adopted new directories. The committee distributed two trial use pieces prior to publication: one in 1964, another in 1966. In 1970 the service book was published with the title The Worshipbook—Services. Two years later it was published as part of The Worshipbook—Services and Hymns.

The contributions of The Worshipbook are noteworthy. As the first of a wave of new service books among American denominations, it broke new ground. It departed from Elizabethan English and began the search for a suitable contemporary style of language appropriate for the worship of God. It set forth with clarity that the norm of Christian worship on the Lord's Day is a service of the Word and Sacrament. Although six years earlier the committee had proposed a new lectionary, it recognized that the lectionary then being completed by the Roman Catholic Church was superior to the lectionary it had prepared. The committee therefore modified the Roman lectionary for use by Presbyterians and included it in the final publication of The Worshipbook. Other denominations also made revisions of the Roman lectionary.

But with all of its contributions, The Worshipbook was vulnerable. Following Vatican Council II there was a great resurgence of liturgical reform that continues unabated in virtually every branch of the church. Service book revision was begun by every church that had a service book. Presbyterians began to recognize the need to go beyond The Worshipbook. It was therefore no surprise that a new service book was soon called for.

== Book of Common Worship (1993) ==
In 1980 the General Assembly of the United Presbyterian Church in the U.S.A. approved an overture from the Presbytery of the Cascades calling for “a new book of services for corporate worship.” In adopting the overture, the General Assembly expressed the fervent hope that the new book would be “an instrument for the renewal of the church at its life-giving center.” Immediately the Presbyterian Church in the United States and the Cumberland Presbyterian Church approved participation in the project.

The process leading to a new service book called for the publication of trial-use resources prior to the finalization of the service book itself. Between 1984 and 1992 seven trial-use resources were published, each including proposed text for a portion of the service book:

- The Service for the Lord's Day published in 1984.
- Holy Baptism and Services for Renewal of Baptism published in 1985.
- Christian Marriage published in 1982.
- The Funeral: A Service of Witness to the Resurrection (published in 1986).
- Daily Prayer published in 1987.
- Services for Occasions of Pastoral Care published in 1990.
- The Liturgical Year published in 1992.

The trial-use volumes were published under the series title: Supplemental Liturgical Resources. Each volume was prepared by a task force chosen for the task. From fifty to one hundred congregations were invited to review testing drafts of each of these resources prior to its approval for publication. Suggestions received from these evaluations greatly contributed to the preparation of the final drafts, and thus to their usefulness in the church. Following the publication of each volume, evaluations and suggestions were received. These responses, based on their use, were carefully considered and were a valuable aid in revising the liturgical texts for inclusion in this book. In revised form the liturgical texts of the seven trial-use resources are included in this book.

During the course of the development of this service book, the reunion in 1983 of the Presbyterian Church in the U.S. and the United Presbyterian Church in the U.S.A. to form the Presbyterian Church (U.S.A.) occurred. This resulted in the preparation of a new Directory for Worship. In the years that followed reunion, until the adoption of the new Directory for Worship in 1989, the preparation of the directory and the development of the service book followed parallel tracks. Because the work was concurrent, there was a creative exchange between the two tasks. Each influenced the other. Appearing four years after the adoption of the revised Directory, the final Book of Common Worship is consistent with the provisions of the Directory.

This book does not include some liturgical resources that ordinarily are included in the previous service books, namely, ordinations, installations, and occasional services such as dedications. At the time of its publication, a major study on ordination is before the Presbyterian Church (U.S.A.). This had precluded the finalization of an ordination rite. The decision was made to do as other churches have done and produce a book of occasional services separate from the Book of Common Worship, which would include additional liturgical resources needed by the church, such as ordinations, installations, dedications, and other occasional services, and liturgies needed by presbyteries to fulfill their responsibilities.

== Book of Occasional Services ==
In 1999, the Geneva Press published for the Presbyterian Church (U.S.A.) a liturgical resource supplementing the 1993 Book of Common Worship, containing multiple services for ordination and installation, commissioning, dedications, marking transitions in congregations and governing bodies, together with additional prayers for various occasions.

== Book of Common Worship (2018) ==
In 2018, the Presbyterian Church (U.S.A.) produced a new Book of Common Worship.

The primary updates were more inclusive language (for example, in marriage services), and more guidance for extemporaenous prayers.

The psalter is shared with the Evangelical Lutheran Church in America.

== Publications of books in the 20th century ==
Henry van Dyke and others were influential in the first publication of a liturgical book for American Presbyterians. It was published in 1906, followed by a revision in 1932. Other books have followed every few decades:

- The Book of Common Worship of 1906
- The Book of Common Worship of 1932
- The Book of Common Worship of 1946
- The Worshipbook of 1970
- The Book of Common Worship of 1993
- The Book of Common Worship of 2018
