= Febronia of Syria =

Eighth-century saint

Saint Febronia of Syria

Virgin martyr
- Born: 8th century Levant
- Died: 9 October 749; Akhmim, Egypt
- Venerated in: Oriental Orthodox
- Feast: 29 Thout (Coptic Orthodox Church)

Febronia of Syria (Coptic: Ϯⲁⲅⲓⲁ ⲫⲓⲃⲣⲟⲛⲓⲁ; Arabic: فبرونيا السورية), also known as Veronica of Syria, is venerated as a Virgin martyr and saint by the Coptic Orthodox Church.

== Life and martyrdom ==
She was born in the Levant in the eighth century AD to a rich family living in Syria and when she grew up, she committed her life to chastity in honor of Jesus Christ. She went to the monastery of the Virgins in Akhmim and became a nun. At the age of 26, she became the head of the monastery in the era of Pope Michael I.

During a period of turmoil that was experienced following the defeat of Marwan II last Caliph of the Umayyad Caliphate, the Bashmurians attacked the monastery of the Archangel Michael for the purpose of plundering and raping nuns. When they saw Veronica and her beauty, they decided not to kill her, but instead gift her to the Caliph as a slave.

When Veronica learned of their plans, she deceived them by telling them she possessed magical oil that can protect them in battle. To convince the soldiers of its effectiveness, she applied the oil to her neck and told them to strike her. She knelt down and prayed to Christ to be a virgin martyr in his name. One of the soldiers then struck her with his sword, resulting in her decapitation. Shocked by the outcome, the soldiers then fled the monastery without plundering anything inside or harming the nuns. Veronica's sacrifice is believed to have saved the other nuns in the monastery.
