= Octavarium Romanum =

Catholic liturgical book

The Octavarium Romanum is a Catholic liturgical book which may be considered as an appendix to the Roman Breviary, but which has not the official position of the other Roman liturgical books.

== History ==
The first mention of this book dates from Pope Sixtus V. In order to introduce a greater variety in the selection of lessons, he ordered the compilation of an Octavarium to comprise the lessons proper to each day of the octaves. The plan was not executed during his pontificate (1585–90).

When the question of correcting the Breviary was raised anew under Clement VIII (1592–1605), the projected Octavarium was again spoken of. The consultors, the most distinguished of whom was Baronius, were in favour of the suggested compilation. Gavanti, another consultor, undertook the work, but his book did not appear until 1628.

Its descriptive title is Octavarium Romanum, Lectiones II et III Nocturni complectens, recitandas infra octavas Festorum, præsertim patronorum locorum et titularium Ecclesiarum quæ cum octavis celebrari debent, juxta rubricas Breviarii Romani, a Sacra Rituum Congregatione ad usum totius orbis ecclesiarum approbatum (Antwerp, 1628). In addition to the letter of approbation, the Papal Brief of Urban VIII and the dedication, the book includes a few pages on the origin, cause and rites of octaves.

The body of the work consists of a collection of readings, or lessons, for the feasts of the Holy Trinity, the Transfiguration, the Holy Cross, several feasts of Our Lady (Conception, Purification, Visitation, Our Lady of the Snows), the feasts of St. Michael, the Apostles, Saints Mary Magdalene, Martha, John, Athanasius, Monica, Nereus and Achilleus, the Seven Brothers, Apollinarius, the feast of the Beheading of St. John the Baptist, of Saints Gregory Thaumaturgus, Basil, Francis, Clement etc. Then follow the varied and well-selected lessons for the commons, drawn from the writings of the Church Fathers.

Numerous editions have appeared since then, with occasional variations. One is by Pustet (Ratisbon, 1883). The reading of the Octavarium is not obligatory, unlike the Breviary.
