= Daniel Lotfy Khella =

Egyptian Coptic Catholic bishop (born 1969)

The Most Reverend Daniel Lotfy Khella
- Bishop of Asyut
- Church: Coptic Catholic Church
- Province: Alexandria
- Diocese: Asyut
- Installed: 23 September 2022
- Predecessor: Kyrillos William
- Other post: Patriarchal Administrator of Ismaylia (2022–2023)
- Previous post: Bishop of Ismaylia (2019–2022)

Orders
- Ordination: 18 July 1996 by Kyrillos William
- Consecration: 5 September 2019 by Ibrahim Isaac Sidrak

Personal details
- Born: Lotfy Khella; 4 May 1969 (age 57) Naja Rezeeq, Asyut Governorate, Egypt
- Residence: Assiut, Egypt
- Education: St. Leo Coptic Catholic Seminary in Maadi, Pontifical John Paul II Institute

Daniel Lotfy Khella (born 4 May 1969) is an Egyptian Coptic Catholic hierarch who has served as the Bishop of the Eparchy of Asyut since 2022. He previously served as the Bishop of the Eparchy of Ismaylia from 2019 to 2022.

== Early life and education ==
Daniel Lotfy Khella was born on 4 May 1969 in the village of Naja Rezeeq, located within the Asyut Governorate of Egypt. He entered the St. Leo Coptic Catholic Seminary in Maadi to study philosophy and theology, graduating with a bachelor's degree in 1996.

From 2006 to 2008, Khella studied in Rome at the John Paul II Pontifical Theological Institute for Marriage and Family Sciences, where he obtained a master's degree in pastoral theology for marriage and family.

== Priesthood ==
Khella was ordained a priest for the Eparchy of Assiut on 18 July 1996 by Bishop Kyrillos William at the Church of the Virgin Mary in his native village of Naja Rezeeq.

During his priestly ministry, he held several pastoral assignments in the Eparchy of Assiut. He served as the pastor of Sacred Heart Church in Qusiya from 1996 to 2000, before becoming a faculty formator at the Maadi Seminary from 2000 to 2001. He then served as pastor of the Church of the Virgin Mary in Dronka from 2001 to 2003. He was appointed pastor of St. Anthony the Great Church in Assiut from 2003 to 2006, returning to the same parish from 2008 to 2013 following his theological studies in Rome. Subsequently, he became the pastor of Our Lady of Divine Love Cathedral in Assiut from 2013 to 2019.

In addition to his parish duties, Father Khella focused extensively on religious education and family ministries. He was appointed Director of Religious Formation for the Eparchy of Assiut from 2008 to 2016 and headed the local Family and Engaged Couples Center starting in 2009. In 2017, he founded and became the director of the eparchy's Family Counseling Institute.

== Episcopal ministry ==
=== Eparchy of Ismaylia ===
In June 2019, the Synod of the Coptic Catholic Church elected Khella to succeed Bishop Makarios Tewfik as the Eparchial Bishop of Ismaylia. Pope Francis officially confirmed and granted his assent to the election on 29 June 2019.

He was consecrated as a bishop on 5 September 2019 at St. Mark's Cathedral in Ismailia. The principal consecrator was Patriarch Ibrahim Isaac Sidrak, assisted by Antonios Cardinal Naguib and several other bishops of the Coptic Catholic Church.

=== Eparchy of Asyut ===
Following the retirement of Bishop Kyrillos William, the Coptic Catholic Synod transferred Khella to the see of his home region on 23 September 2022. He was formally installed in Asyut on 13 October 2022.

Concurrently with his transfer, he was appointed Patriarchal Administrator of his former see in Ismaylia, a position he held until the installation of his successor, Pola Ayoub Matta Usama Shafik Akhnoukh, on 11 May 2023.
