= Monastery of the Martyrs =

Coptic Orthodox monastery in Upper Egypt

Monastery of the Martyrs or Monastery of Saint Ammonius
- Location within Egypt
- Interactive map of Monastery of the Martyrs or Monastery of Saint Ammonius

Monastery information
- Other names: Deir el-Shuhada or Deir el Manawus
- Established: unknown
- Dedication: Saint Ammonius & 3,600 Martyrs of Esna
- Diocese: Coptic Orthodox Church of Alexandria

People
- Founder: Saint Ammonius

Site
- Location: Esna, Luxor
- Country: Egypt
- Coordinates: 25.257222°N 32.546944°E
- Public access: Yes

The Monastery of Saint Ammonius, also known as the Monastery of the Martyrs, is a Coptic Orthodox monastery near Esna.

== See also ==
- Coptic monasticism
