= Youhannes Ezzat Zakaria Badir =

Coptic catholic bishop

- Eparch of Luxor
- Native name: يوحنس عزت زكريا بادر
- Church: Coptic Catholic Church
- Diocese: Eparchy of Luxor
- In office: 23 June 1994 – 27 December 2015
- Predecessor: Aghnatios Elias Yaacoub
- Successor: Emmanuel Bishay
- Previous post: Eparch of Ismaylia (1992-1994)

Orders
- Ordination: 5 August 1973
- Consecration: 29 January 1993 by Stéphanos II Ghattas

Personal details
- Born: 12 August 1949 Abu Qirqas, Kingdom of Egypt
- Died: 22 December 2015 (aged 66)

Youhannes Ezzat Zakaria Badir (12 August 1949 – 27 December 2015) was an Egyptian Coptic Catholic bishop.

Ordained a priest on 5 August 1973, Zakaria Badir was named bishop of Ismaylia, Egypt, on 23 November 1992 and was consecrated bishop on 29 January 1993. He was then named bishop of Luqsor on 23 June 1994.
