= Kyrillos Makarios =

Head of the Coptic Catholic Church from 1899 to 1908

- Patriarch of Alexandria
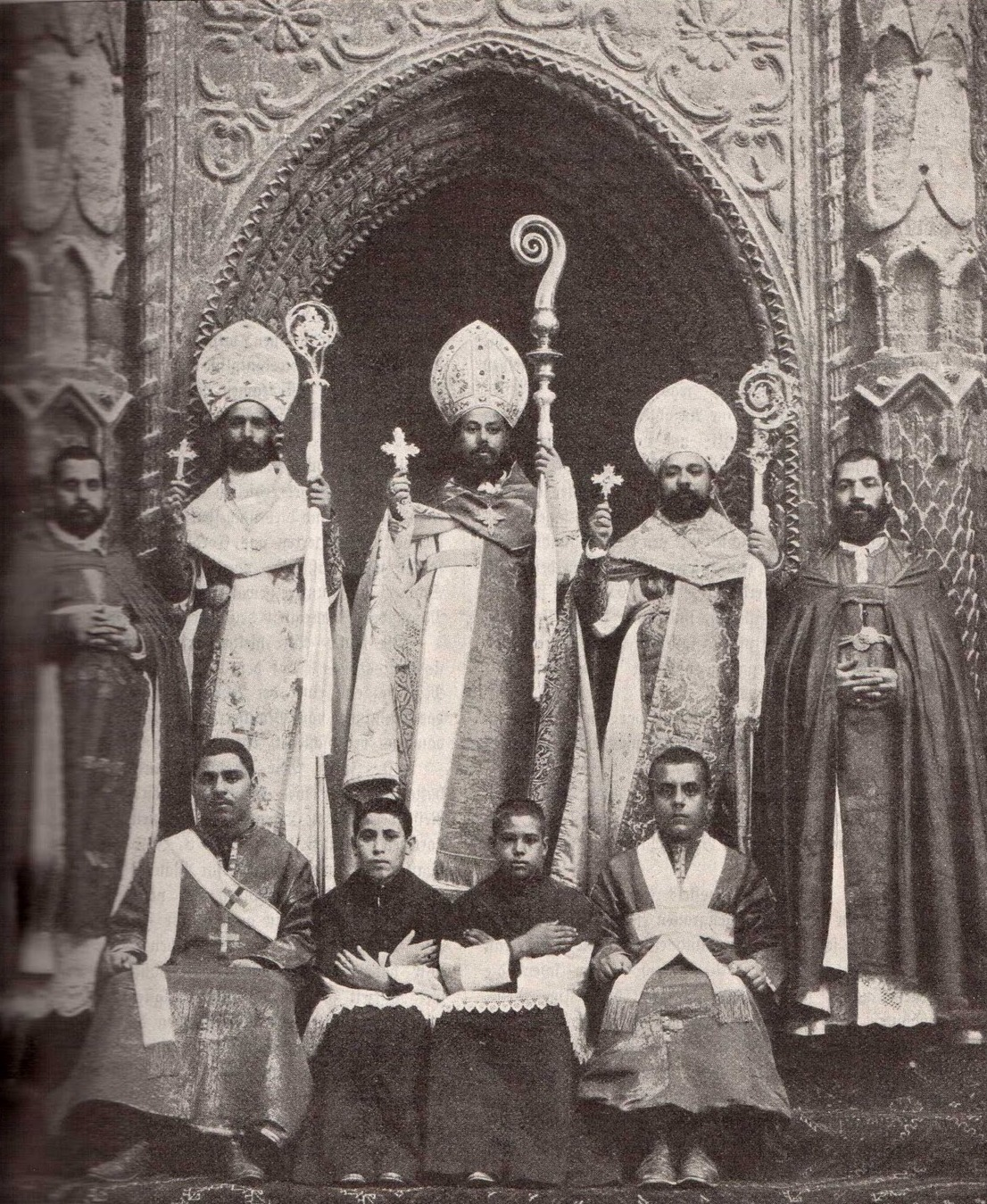
- Kyrillos Makarios (middle) in 1900
- Native name: كيرلس مقار
- Church: Coptic Catholic Church
- Installed: 19 June 1899
- Term ended: 30 May 1908
- Predecessor: Maximos Jouwed
- Successor: Markos II Khouzam
- Previous posts: Titular Archeparch of Caesarea Philippi (1895-1899); Vicar Apostolic of Alexandria (1895-1899)

Orders
- Ordination: 1891
- Consecration: 17 April 1895 by Guido Corbelli

Personal details
- Born: 9 February 1867 Scenaineh, Sidfa, Eyalet of Egypt, Ottoman Empire
- Died: 18 May 1921 (aged 54)

Kyrillos Makarios also written as Cyrillus Macaire (in Arabic كيرلس مقار ) (born 9 February 1867 - died 18 May 1921) was a leader of the Coptic Catholic Church, an Eastern Catholic sui juris particular church of the Catholic Church. He served as Patriarch of Alexandria from 1899 to 1908 when he resigned.

Kyrillos Makarios was born in a village called Scenaineh, in Sidfa, which is in Asyut governorate in 1867 and was ordained a priest in 1891. He was appointed as Apostolic Vicar of the Coptic Catholic Church on 15 March 1895 and was appointed as Titular Archbishop of Caesarea Philippi and ordained on the position on 17 April 1895. He headed a Coptic Catholic delegation in September 1895 to the Vatican to meet with Pope Leo XIII after the latter's encyclical dated 11 June 1895 to the Egyptian Catholic Church followers. The delegation requested the reinstatement of the seat of the Coptic Catholic Patriarchate. The papal decision followed quickly on 26 November 1895 reestablishing the patriarchal seat, assigning two eparchies, namely The Eparchy of Hermopolis (El Minia) to be headed by Bishop Maximus Sedfawi and Eparchy of Taybeh (Luxor) to be headed by Bishop Ignatius Barazi, and confirmed Kyrillos Makarios as Apostolic Vicar.

In 1898, he held the First Alexandria Council for the Catholic Copts heading as vicar. He served as Vicar until 19 June 1899 when he was appointed as Patriarch of Alexandria as the first patriarch of the reinstated Coptic Catholic Patriarchate and was officially ordained as Patriarch in July 1899. He was instrumental in organizing the dioceses and the churches. His successes however prompted much opposition, upon which he tended his resignation from the seat and retreated to Beirut, Lebanon.

After his resignation, the Patriarchal seat remained vacant from 1908 until 1947. During this period, Maximos Sedfaoui served as locum tenens of the Coptic Catholic Church (1908–1925) with Kyrillos Makarios remaining as Patriarch Emeritus (a titular position) until his death on 18 May 1921.

After the death of Sedfaoui, Markos Khouzam became locum tenens of the Coptic Catholic Church (1927–1947) until his ordination as Patriarch of Alexandria Markos II Khouzam in 1947.

== See also ==
- List of Coptic Catholic Patriarchs of Alexandria

Catholic Church titles
Preceded by Seat reinstated by Pope Leo XIII	Coptic Patriarch of Alexandria; 1899–1908 (resigned)	Succeeded by Vacant (1908-1947); Markos II Khouzam (1947-1958)
