= Markos II Khouzam =

Head of the Coptic Catholic Church from 1947 to 1958

- Patriarch of Alexandria
- Native name: مرقس الثاني خزام
- Church: Coptic Catholic Church
- Installed: 10 August 1947
- Term ended: 2 February 1958
- Predecessor: Kyrillos Makarios
- Successor: Stéphanos I Sidarouss
- Previous post: Eparch of Luxor (1926-1947)

Orders
- Ordination: 30 April 1911
- Consecration: 30 November 1926 by Andrea Cassulo

Personal details
- Born: 16 March 1888 Akhmim, Occupied Khedivate of Egypt, Ottoman Empire
- Died: 2 February 1958 (aged 69)

Markos II Khouzam in Arabic مرقس الثاني خزام (born 16 March 1888 - died 2 February 1958) was a leader of the Coptic Catholic Church, an Eastern Catholic sui juris particular church of the Catholic Church. He served as Patriarch of Alexandria from 1947 to 1958.

Markos Khouzam was born in Akhmim, Sohag Governorate, Egypt and studied in Cairo in 1898. He was sent on a religious mission to Beirut, Lebanon in 1905 and became a priest on 30 April 1911 and was appointed in August 1926 as a pastor for Abou Korkas, and ordained as bishop on 30 November 1926 and archbishop of Tayibe, Dakahlia Governorate in Egypt.

He was assigned as locum tenens for the Coptic Catholic Patriarchate in 1927 in succession to another locum tenens Maximos Sedfaoui, who had served before him from 1908 to 1927 in the period when the Patriarchal seat remained vacant (1908-1947) after the resignation of the Coptic Catholic Patriarch Kyrillos Makarios.

Khouzam was enthroned on the Patriarchal seat on 10 August 1947 and served as Patriarch for a decade until his death on 2 February 1958. He was followed by Patriarch Stéphanos I Sidarouss. He met with Pope Pius XII.

== See also ==
- List of Coptic Catholic Patriarchs of Alexandria

Catholic Church titles
Preceded by Kyrillos Makarios (1899-1908); Vacant (1908-1947)	Coptic Patriarch of Alexandria; 1947–1958	Succeeded by Stéphanos I Sidarouss
