= Essenes =

Jewish sect during the Second Temple period

Essenes, Essenians אִסִּיִים
- Historical leader: Teacher of Righteousness
- Founded: 2nd century BCE
- Dissolved: 1st century CE
- Headquarters: Qumran (proposed)
- Ideology: Asceticism; Communality; Daily Ritual Baptism; Mysticism; Predestination
- Religion: Judaism

The Essenes (/ˈɛsiːnz, ɛˈsiːnz/; Hebrew: אִסִּיִים, Īssīyīm; Greek: Ἐσσηνοί, Ἐσσαῖοι, or Ὀσσαῖοι, Essenoi, Essaioi, Ossaioi) or Essenians were a mystic Jewish community during the Second Temple period that flourished from the 2nd century BCE to the 1st century CE.

The Essene movement likely originated as a distinct group among Jews during Jonathan Apphus's time, driven by disputes over Jewish law and the belief that Jonathan's high priesthood was illegitimate. Most scholars think the Essenes seceded from the Zadokite priests. They attributed their interpretation of the Torah to their early leader, the Teacher of Righteousness, possibly a legitimate high priest. Embracing a conservative approach to Jewish law, they observed a strict hierarchy favoring priests (the Sons of Zadok) over laypeople, emphasized ritual purity, and held a dualistic worldview.

According to Jewish writers Josephus and Philo, the Essenes numbered around four thousand, and resided in various settlements throughout Judaea. Conversely, Roman writer Pliny the Elder positioned them somewhere above Ein Gedi, on the west side of the Dead Sea. Pliny relates in a few lines that the Essenes possess no money, had existed for thousands of generations, and that their priestly class ("contemplatives") did not marry. Josephus gave a detailed account of the Essenes in The Jewish War (c. 75 CE), with a shorter description in Antiquities of the Jews (c. 94 CE) and The Life of Flavius Josephus (c. 97 CE). Claiming firsthand knowledge, he lists the Essenoi as one of the three sects of Jewish philosophy alongside the Pharisees and Sadducees. He relates the same information concerning piety, celibacy; the absence of personal property and of money; the belief in communality; and commitment to a strict observance of Sabbath. He further adds that the Essenes ritually immersed in water every morning (a practice similar to the use of the mikveh for daily immersion found among some contemporary Hasidim), ate together after prayer, devoted themselves to charity and benevolence, forbade the expression of anger, studied the books of the elders, preserved secrets, and were very mindful of the names of the angels kept in their sacred writings.

The Essenes have gained fame in modern times as a result of the discovery of an extensive group of religious documents known as the Dead Sea Scrolls, which are commonly believed to be the Essenes' library. The scrolls were found at Qumran, an archaeological site situated along the northwestern shore of the Dead Sea, believed to have been the dwelling place of an Essene community. These documents preserve multiple copies of parts of the Hebrew Bible along with deuterocanonical and sectarian manuscripts, including writings such as the Community Rule, the Damascus Document, and the War Scroll.

According to the conventional view, the Essenes disappeared after the First Jewish–Roman War, which also witnessed the destruction of the settlement at Qumran. Scholars have noted the absence of direct sources supporting this claim, raising the possibility of their endurance or the survival of related groups in the following centuries. Some researchers suggest that Essene teachings could have influenced other religious traditions, such as Mandaeism and Christianity.

== Etymology ==
Josephus uses the name Essenes in his two main accounts, The Jewish War 2.119, 158, 160 and Antiquities of the Jews, 13.171–2, but some manuscripts read here Essaion ("holding the Essenes in honour"; "a certain Essene named Manaemus"; "to hold all Essenes in honor"; "the Essenes").

In several places, however, Josephus has Essaios, which is usually assumed to mean Essene ("Judas of the Essaios race"; "Simon of the Essaios race"; "John the Essaios"; "those who are called by us Essaioi"; "Simon a man of the Essaios race"). Josephus identified the Essenes as one of the three major Jewish sects of that period.

Philo's usage is Essaioi, although he admits this Greek form of the original name, that according to his etymology signifies "holiness", to be inexact. Pliny's Latin text has Esseni.

Gabriele Boccaccini implies that a convincing etymology for the name Essene has not been found, but that the term applies to a larger group within Judea that also included the Qumran community.

It was proposed before the Dead Sea Scrolls were discovered that the name came into several Greek spellings from a Hebrew self-designation later found in some Dead Sea Scrolls, ʻosey haTorah, "'doers' or 'makers' of Torah". Although dozens of etymology suggestions have been published, this is the only etymology published before 1947 that was confirmed by Qumran text self-designation references, and it is gaining acceptance among scholars. It is recognized as the etymology of the form Ossaioi (and note that Philo also offered an O spelling) and Essaioi and Esseni spelling variations have been discussed by VanderKam, Goranson, and others. In medieval Hebrew (e.g., Sefer Yosippon) Hassidim "the Pious" replaces "Essenes". While this Hebrew name is not the etymology of Essaioi/Esseni, the Aramaic equivalent Hesi'im known from Eastern Aramaic texts has been suggested. Others suggest that Essene is a transliteration of the Hebrew word ḥiṣonim (ḥiṣon "outside"), which the Mishnah (e.g., Megillah 4:8) uses to describe various sectarian groups. Another theory is that the name was borrowed from a cult of devotees to Artemis in Anatolia, whose demeanor and dress somewhat resembled those of the group in Judea.

Flavius Josephus in Chapter 8 of "The Jewish War" states:

2.(119)For there are three philosophical sects among the Jews. The followers of the first of which are the Pharisees; of the second, the Sadducees; and the third sect, which pretends to a severer discipline, are called Essenes. These last are Jews by birth, and seem to have a greater affection for each other than other sects have.

== Location ==
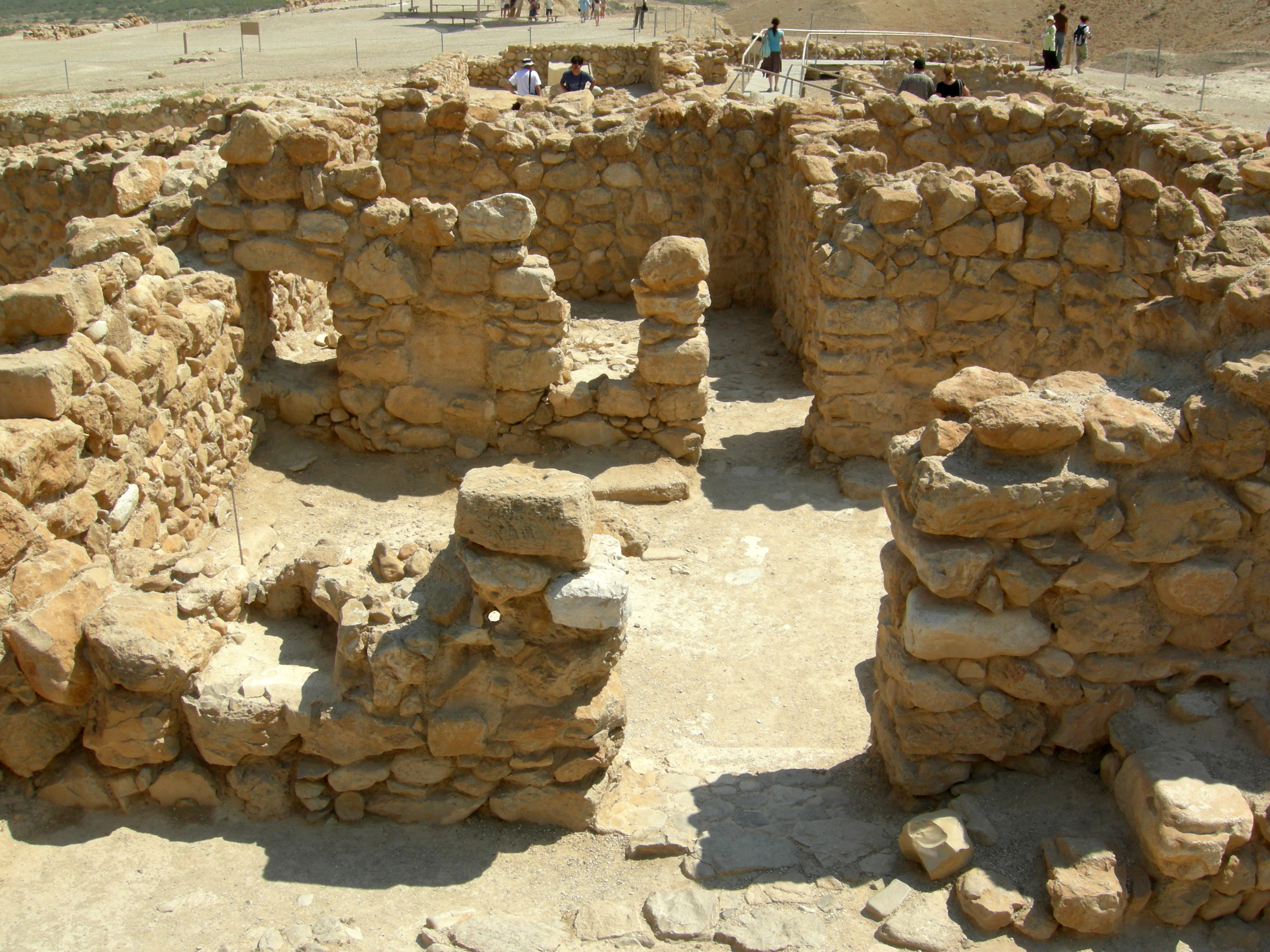
Remains of part of the main building at Qumran

According to Josephus, the Essenes had settled "not in one city" but "in large numbers in every town". Philo speaks of "more than four thousand" Essaioi living in "Palestine and Syria", more precisely, "in many cities of Judaea and in many villages and grouped in great societies of many members".

Pliny locates them "on the west side of the Dead Sea, away from the coast ... [above] the town of Engeda".

Some modern scholars and archeologists have argued that Essenes inhabited the settlement at Qumran, a plateau in the Judean Desert along the Dead Sea, citing Pliny the Elder in support and giving credence that the Dead Sea Scrolls are the product of the Essenes. This theory, though not yet conclusively proven, has come to dominate the scholarly discussion and public perception of the Essenes.

According to archeologist Rachel Hachlili, the individual, isolated burials found at the Qumran cemeteries differ from typical Jewish burial customs: "The old Jewish tradition of burying the dead with their ancestors was not followed by the Qumran community, where individual burial was stressed." This seems to indicate "that the residents of Qumran were not families and that it was a community cemetery."

In the same area along the Dead Sea shore there are also the sites of Ein Feshkha and Ain el-Ghuweir, which have been linked with the Qumran settlement.

== Rules, customs, theology, and beliefs ==
The accounts by Josephus and Philo show that the Essenes led a strictly communal life—often compared to later Christian monasticism. Many of the Essene groups appear to have been celibate, but Josephus speaks also of another "order of Essenes" that observed the practice of being engaged for three years and then becoming married. According to Josephus, they had customs and observances such as collective ownership, electing a leader to attend to the interests of the group, and obedience to the orders from their leader. Also, they were forbidden from swearing oaths and from sacrificing animals. They controlled their tempers and served as channels of peace, carrying weapons only for protection against robbers. The Essenes chose not to possess slaves but served each other and, as a result of communal ownership, did not engage in trading. Josephus and Philo provide lengthy accounts of their communal meetings, meals, and religious celebrations. This communal living has led some scholars to view the Essenes as a group practicing social and material egalitarianism.

Despite their prohibition on swearing oaths, after a three-year probationary period, new members would take an oath that included a commitment to practice piety to God and righteousness toward humanity; maintain a pure lifestyle; abstain from criminal and immoral activities; transmit their rules uncorrupted; and preserve the books of the Essenes and the names of the angels. Their theology included belief in the immortality of the soul and that they would receive their souls back after death. Part of their activities included purification by water rituals which was supported by rainwater catchment and storage. According to the Community Rule, repentance was a prerequisite to water purification.

Ritual purification was a common practice among the peoples of Judea during this period and was thus not specific to the Essenes. A ritual bath or mikveh was found near many synagogues of the period continuing into modern times. Purity and cleanliness was considered so important to the Essenes that they would refrain from defecation on the Sabbath.

According to Joseph Lightfoot, the Church Father Epiphanius (writing in the 4th century CE) seems to make a distinction between two main groups within the Essenes: "Of those that came before his [Elxai, an Ossaean prophet] time and during it, the Ossaeans and the Nasaraeans." Part 18 Epiphanius describes each group as following:

The Nasaraean—they were Jews by nationality—originally from Gileaditis, Bashanitis and the Transjordan ... They acknowledged Moses and believed that he had received laws—not this law, however, but some other. And so, they were Jews who kept all the Jewish observances, but they would not offer sacrifice or eat meat. They considered it unlawful to eat meat or make sacrifices with it. They claim that these Books are fictions, and that none of these customs were instituted by the fathers. This was the difference between the Nasaraean and the others ...

After this Nasaraean sect in turn comes another closely connected with them, called the Ossaeans. These are Jews like the former ... originally came from Nabataea, Ituraea, Moabitis, and Arielis, the lands beyond the basin of what sacred scripture called the Salt Sea ... Though it is different from the other six of these seven sects, it causes schism only by forbidding the books of Moses like the Nasaraean.

We do not know much about the canon of the Essenes, and what their attitude was towards the apocryphal writings. However, the Essenes perhaps did not esteem the book of Esther highly as manuscripts of Esther are completely absent in Qumran, likely because of their opposition to mixed marriages and the use of different calendars.

The Essenes were unique for their time for being against the practice of slave-ownership, which they regarded as unjust and ungodly, believing that all men are born equal.

== Involvement in the First Jewish–Roman War ==
At the outset of the First Jewish–Roman War in 66 CE, as Roman advances were anticipated, command over parts of western Judea was assigned to John the Essene (or Essaean), who was placed in charge of the toparchy of Thamna. This region encompassed Lydda, Joppa, and Emmaus.

== Scholarly discussion ==
Josephus and Philo discuss the Essenes in detail. Most scholars believe that the community at Qumran that most likely produced the Dead Sea Scrolls was an offshoot of the Essenes. However, this theory has been disputed by some; for example, Norman Golb argues that the primary research on the Qumran documents and ruins (by Father Roland de Vaux, from the École Biblique et Archéologique de Jérusalem) lacked scientific method, and drew wrong conclusions that comfortably entered the academic canon. For Golb, the number of documents is too extensive and includes many different writing styles and calligraphies; the ruins seem to have been a fortress, used as a military base for a very long period of time—including the 1st century—so they therefore could not have been inhabited by the Essenes; and the large graveyard excavated in 1870, just 50 metres (160 ft) east of the Qumran ruins, was made of over 1200 tombs that included many women and children; Pliny clearly wrote that the Essenes who lived near the Dead Sea "had not one woman, had renounced all pleasure... and no one was born in their race". Golb's book presents observations about de Vaux's premature conclusions and their uncontroverted acceptance by the general academic community. He states that the documents probably stemmed from various libraries in Jerusalem, kept safe in the desert from the Roman invasions. Other scholars refute these arguments—particularly since Josephus describes some Essenes as allowing marriage.

Another issue is the relationship between the Essaioi and Philo's Therapeutae and Therapeutrides. He regarded the Therapeutae as a contemplative branch of the Essaioi who, he said, pursued an active life.

One theory on the formation of the Essenes suggests that the movement was founded by a Jewish high priest, dubbed by the Essenes the Teacher of Righteousness, whose office had been usurped by Jonathan (of priestly but not of Zadokite lineage), labeled the "man of lies" or "false priest". Others follow this line and a few argue that the Teacher of Righteousness was not only the leader of the Essenes at Qumran, but was also identical to the original Messianic figure about 150 years before the time of the Gospels. Fred Gladstone Bratton notes that

The Teacher of Righteousness of the Scrolls would seem to be a prototype of Jesus, for both spoke of the New Covenant; they preached a similar gospel; each was regarded as a Savior or Redeemer; and each was condemned and put to death by reactionary factions... We do not know whether Jesus was an Essene, but some scholars feel that he was at least influenced by them.

Lawrence Schiffman has argued that the Qumran community may be called Sadducean, and not Essene, since their legal positions retain a link with Sadducean tradition.

== Connection to other religious traditions ==
=== Mandaeism ===
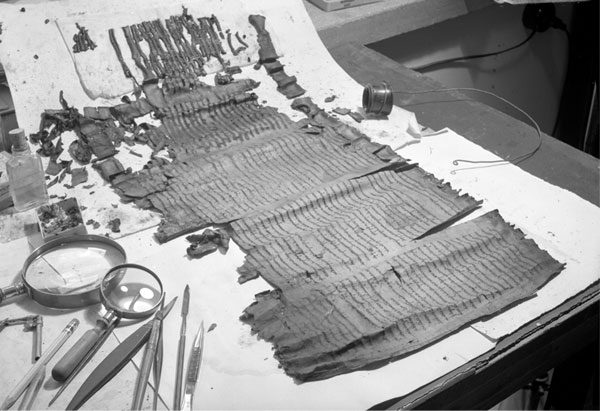
The Genesis Apocryphon, part of the Dead Sea Scrolls

The Haran Gawaita uses the name Nasoraeans for the Mandaeans who fled from Jerusalem, meaning guardians or possessors of secret rites and knowledge. Scholars such as Kurt Rudolph, Rudolf Macúch, Mark Lidzbarski and Ethel S. Drower connect the Mandaeans with the Nasaraeans described by Epiphanius, a group within the Essenes according to Joseph Lightfoot. Epiphanius (29:6) says that they existed before Jesus. That is questioned by some, but others accept the pre-Christian origin of the Nasaraeans.

Early religious concepts and terminologies recur in the Dead Sea Scrolls, and Yardena (Jordan) has been the name of every baptismal water in Mandaeism. Mara ḏ-Rabuta (Mandaic for 'Lord of Greatness', which is One of the names for the Mandaean God Hayyi Rabbi) is found in the Genesis Apocryphon II, 4. Another early self-appellation is bhiria zidqa, meaning 'elect of righteousness' or 'the chosen righteous', a term found in the Book of Enoch and Genesis Apocryphon II, 4. As Nasoraeans, Mandaeans believe that they constitute the true congregation of bnia nhura, meaning 'Sons of Light', a term used by the Essenes. Mandaean scripture affirms that the Mandaeans descend directly from John the Baptist's original Nasoraean Mandaean disciples in Jerusalem. Similar to the Essenes, it is forbidden for a Mandaean to reveal the names of the angels to a gentile. Essene graves are oriented north–south and a Mandaean's grave must also be in the north–south direction so that if the dead Mandaean were stood upright, they would face north. Mandaeans have an oral tradition that some were originally vegetarian and also similar to the Essenes, they are pacifists.

The bit manda (beth manda) is described as biniana rba ḏ-šrara ("the Great building of Truth") and bit tušlima ("house of Perfection") in Mandaean texts such as the Qulasta, Ginza Rabba, and the Mandaean Book of John. The only known literary parallels are in Essene texts from Qumran such as the Community Rule, which has similar phrases such as the "house of Perfection and Truth in Israel" (Community Rule 1QS VIII 9) and "house of Truth in Israel."

=== Christianity ===
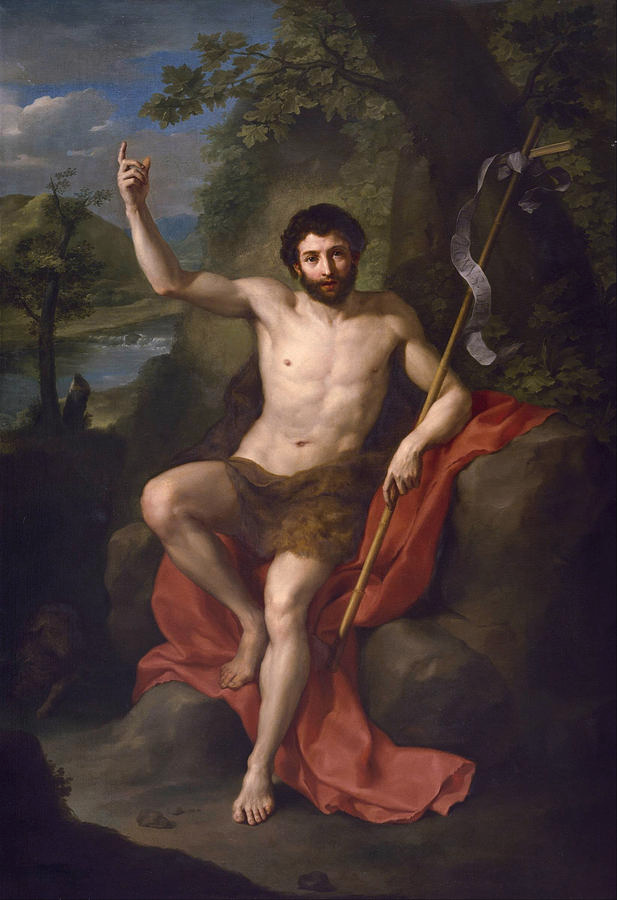
John the Baptist was possibly an Essene.

Rituals of the Essenes and Christianity have much in common; the Dead Sea Scrolls describe a meal of bread and wine that will be instituted by the messiah, both the Essenes and Christians were eschatological communities, where judgement on the world would come at any time. The New Testament also possibly quotes writings used by the Qumran community. Luke 1:31-35 states " And now you will conceive in your womb and bear a son and you will name him Jesus. He will be great and will be called the son of the Most High ... the son of God" which seems to echo 4Q246, stating: "He will be called great and he will be called Son of God, and they will call him Son of the Most High ... He will judge the earth in righteousness ... and every nation will bow down to him".

Other similarities include high devotion to the faith even to the point of martyrdom, communal prayer, self denial and a belief in a captivity in a sinful world.

John the Baptist has also been argued to have been an Essene, as there are numerous parallels between John's mission and the Essenes, which suggests he perhaps was trained by the Essene community. Historian Daniel R. Schwartz identified a number of features that John shared with the Qumran community: both were active in the Judaean Desert; both emphasized an ascetic lifestyle. John taught his followers to renounce or share possessions; he too descended from a priestly family and was convinced that judgment was imminent. His linkage of repentance with ritual immersion, his stringency regarding prohibited sexual unions, and his insistence that Jewish ancestry conferred no automatic standing before God are all views that can be found among the people of Qumran. Schwartz writes that, even if it cannot be established that John himself belonged to the sect, the community reflected in the scrolls provides the historical setting against which his activity becomes intelligible. He suggests that John may at minimum have been shaped by people connected to the group. On this reconstruction, the Qumran milieu reached early Christianity indirectly through John and his connection with Jesus.

In the early Christian church a book called the Odes of Solomon was written. The writer was very likely a convert from the Essene community into Christianity. The book reflects a mixture of mystical ideas of the Essene community with Christian concepts.

Both the Essenes and Christians practiced voluntary celibacy and prohibited divorce. Both also used concepts of "light" and "darkness" for good and evil.

A few have claimed that the Essenes had an idea of a pierced Messiah based on 4Q285; however, the interpretation of the text is ambiguous. Some scholars interpreted it as the Messiah being killed himself, while modern scholars mostly interpret it as the Messiah executing the enemies of Israel in an eschatological war.

Both the Essenes and Christians practiced a ritual of immersion by water. The Essenes, however, had it as a regular practice instead of a one-time event.

Devotional writers associated with the Carmelites, such as Daniel de la Vierge-Marie, made the claim in the 17th century that the Essenes had been proto-Christian and that they were synonymous with the Carmelites since the times of the Prophet Elias. This was a hotly disputed issue about the antiquity of the Carmelites with their rivals the Bollandists.

=== Magarites ===
The Magharians or Magarites (Arabic: Al-Maghariyyah, 'people of the caves') were, according to Jacob Qirqisani, a Jewish sect founded in the 1st century BCE. Abraham Harkavy and others identify the Magharians with the Essenes, and their author referred to as the "Alexandrinian" with Philo (whose affinity for the Essenes is well-known), based on the following evidence:

- The sect's name, which, in his view, does not refer to its books but to its followers who lived in caves or desert areas—an established Essene lifestyle;
- The sect's founding date coinciding with that of the Essenes;
- The theory that God interacts with humans through an angel aligning with Essene beliefs, as well as Philo's concept of the Logos;
- Qirqisani's omission of the Essenes from his list of Jewish sects, which can be explained if he considered the Magharians to be synonymous with the Essenes.

== See also ==
- Bana'im
- Hellenistic Judaism
- Hemerobaptists
- Hypsistarians
- Jewish vegetarianism
- Sacred mysteries
- Sons of Zadok
- Sufism
