= The Baptism of Hibil Ziwa =

Mandaean text

Diwan Maṣbuta ḏ-Hibil Ziwa
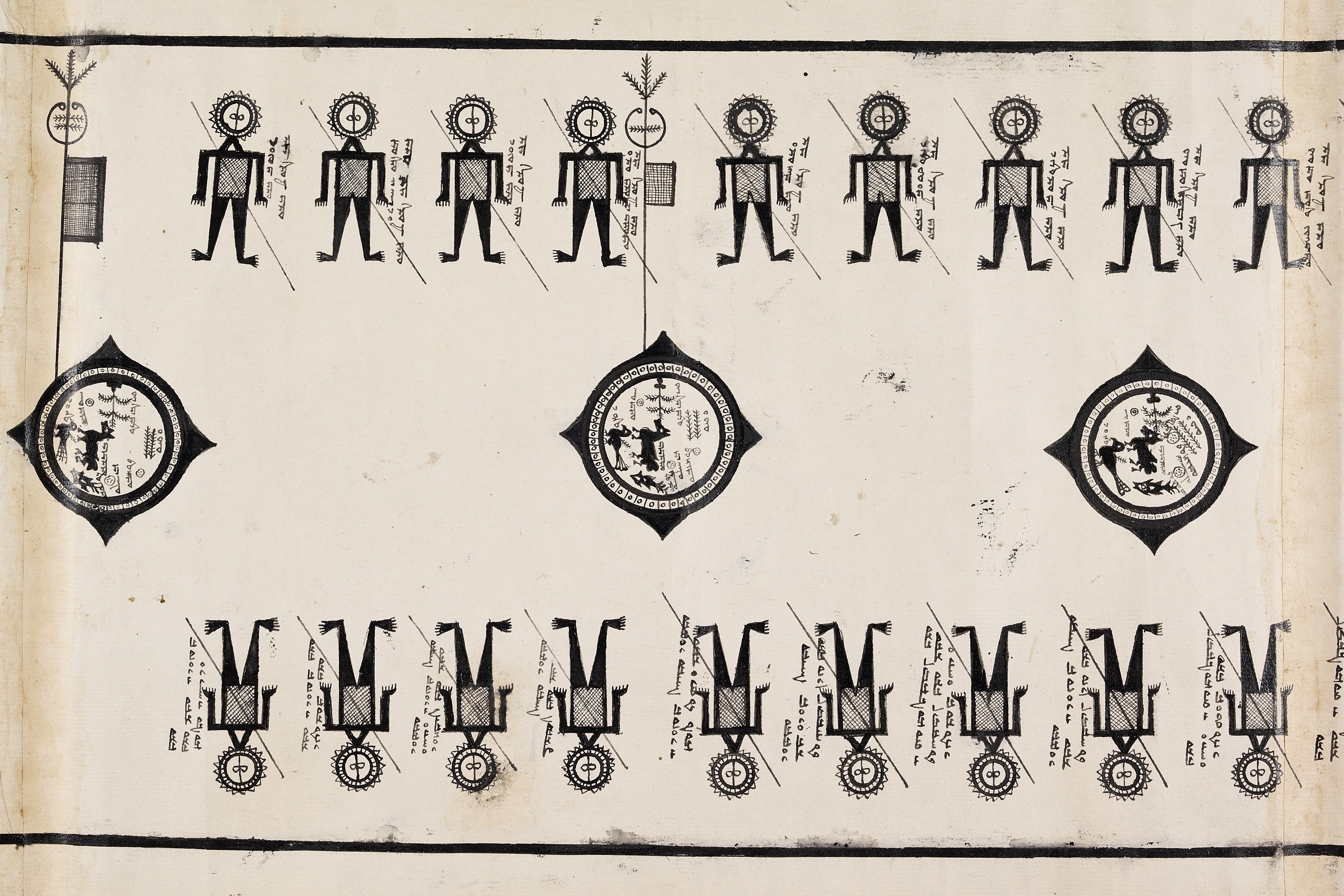
- Rows of uthras in Diwan Maṣbuta ḏ-Hibil Ziwa (DC 35)

Information
- Religion: Mandaeism
- Language: Mandaic language

The Baptism of Hibil Ziwa or Diwan Maṣbuta ḏ-Hibil Ziwa (Classical Mandaic: ࡃࡉࡅࡀࡍ ࡌࡀࡑࡁࡅࡕࡀ ࡖࡄࡉࡁࡉࡋ ࡆࡉࡅࡀ, "Scroll of the Baptism of Hibil Ziwa") is a Mandaean illustrated scroll. It describes the soteriological descent of Hibil Ziwa to the World of Darkness, and his baptisms before and after. The scroll is essentially also a commentary on the maṣbuta, or Mandaean ritual baptism.

The scroll is lavishly illustrated, showing figures of dozens of uthras and mythological creatures and realms.

== Synopsis of narrative ==
The beginning of the text is missing, and the text as it exists opens with Yawar Hibil approaching the King of Light, who baptises him in 360 yardeni, clothes him in 360 robes of light, and bestows him with the Great Mystery, seven staves, and other attributes. Hibil is dispatched to the World of Darkness, descends to confront and seal Krun, and ascends to the world of Qin, where he secretly takes the mysteries of the jewel, mirror and bitter herb from Qin when she reveals them, and captures Ruha, who is pregnant with Ur, also taking Ptahil.

He ascends further to the world of Gaf and offers prayers to the King of Light, who sends for Manda d-Hayyi to send a Letter of Kushta and phial of oil to Hibil, which are received, but Hibil and his companions remain detained by the powers of darkness, until a masiqta is performed, following which they ascend to the middle world, alarming the guards, in response to which the Great Mana dispatches Yushamin, who interrogates Hibil's identity and permits him re-entry to the World of Light. The remainder of the text is a detailed ritual commentary and instruction on the 360-fold baptism performed on Hibil after returning, which is a form of baptism traditionally used to restore ritual purity to a priest.

== Manuscripts and translations ==
The Diwan Maṣbuta d-Hibil Ziwa and the Haran Gawaita were published, with English translation, by E. S. Drower in 1953. Drower's translation was primarily based on manuscript 35 of the Drower Collection (abbreviated DC 35), and includes an autobiographical appendix by Yahya Bihram following the final colophon. Portions of the text, including hymns, were also present in, and cross-referenced with, a related text in manuscript 50 (DC 50, Šarḥ ḏ-Maṣbuta Rabia). A typesetted Mandaic version of DC 35 was published by Majid Fandi Al-Mubaraki in 2002.

BL Add. 23,602B, titled Kholasta sive liturgica Sabiorum Libri Joannis Fragmenta Mendaice, is a book of fragments that was probably obtained by Colonel John George Taylor. It contains fragments of Maṣbuta ḏ-Hibil Ziua and Alma Rišaia Rba.

MS RRC 2U, another manuscript version of Maṣbuta ḏ-Hibil Ziwa, was copied in 1168 A.H. (1754–5 A.D.). DC 35 (from 1247 A.H. (1831–2 A.D.)) was copied from RRC 2U.

== Parallels ==
The narrative portion of the text parallels book 5 of the Right Ginza, while book 4 includes a considerably shorter account of a baptism of Hibil, Sheetil and Anush.

It has also been compared to the Hymn of the Pearl from the apocryphal Acts of Thomas.
