= Therapeutae =

Religious sect

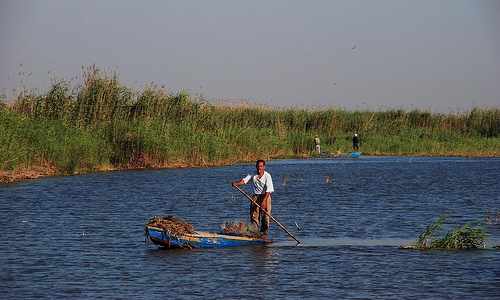
Lake Mariout today

The Therapeutae were a philosophico-religious sect which existed in Alexandria and other parts of the ancient Greek world. The primary source concerning the Therapeutae is the De vita contemplativa ("The Contemplative Life"), traditionally ascribed to the Jewish philosopher Philo of Alexandria (c. 20 BCE – 50 CE).

The author of De vita appears to have been personally acquainted with them. The author describes the Therapeutae as "philosophers" (cf. I.2) and mentions a group that lived on a low hill by Lake Mariout close to Alexandria in circumstances resembling lavrite life (cf. III.22). They were "the best" of a kind given to "perfect goodness" that "exists in many places in the inhabited world" (cf. III.21). The author was unsure of the origin of the name and derives the name Therapeutae/Therapeutides from Greek θεραπεύω in the sense of "cure" or "worship" (cf. I.2).

== Name ==
The term Therapeutae (plural) is Latin, from Philo's Greek plural Therapeutai (Θεραπευταί). The term therapeutes means one who is attendant to the gods although the term, and the related adjective therapeutikos carry in later texts the meaning of attending to heal, or treating in a spiritual or medical sense. The Greek feminine plural Therapeutrides (Θεραπευτρίδες) is sometimes encountered for their female members. The term therapeutae may occur in relation to followers of Asclepius at Pergamon, and therapeutai may also occur in relation to worshippers of Sarapis in inscriptions, such as on Delos.

== De vita contemplativa account ==
Philo described the Therapeutae in De vita contemplativa ("On the contemplative life"), written in the first century CE. The origins of the Therapeutae were unclear, and Philo was even unsure about the etymology of their name, which he explained as meaning either physicians of souls or servants of God. The opening phrases of his essay establish that it followed one that has been lost, on the active life. Philo was employing the familiar polarity in Hellenic philosophy between the active and the contemplative life, exemplifying the active life by the Essenes, another severely ascetic sect, and the contemplative life by the desert-dwelling Therapeutae.

According to De Vita Contemplativa, the Therapeutae were widely distributed in the Ancient world, among the Greeks and beyond in the non-Greek world of the "barbarians", with one of their major gathering points being in Alexandria, in the area of the Lake Mareotis:

Now this class of persons may be met with in many places, for it was fitting that both Greece and the country of the barbarians should partake of whatever is perfectly good; and there is the greatest number of such men in Egypt, in every one of the districts, or nomes, as they are called, and especially around Alexandria; and from all quarters those who are the best of these therapeutae proceed on their pilgrimage to some most suitable place as if it were their country, which is beyond the Maereotic lake.

— De Vita Contemplativa

=== Teachings and lifestyle ===
==== Temperance and simplicity ====
They lived chastely with utter simplicity; they "first of all laid down temperance as a sort of foundation for the soul to rest upon, proceed to build up other virtues on this foundation" (Philo). They renounced property and followed severe discipline:

These men abandon their property without being influenced by any predominant attraction, and flee without even turning their heads back again.

— De Vita Contemplativa para. 18

==== Six days per week of solitude, meeting on seventh day, with teaching and hymns ====
They were dedicated to the contemplative life, and their activities for six days of the week consisted of ascetic practices, fasting, solitary prayers and the study of the scriptures in their isolated cells, each with its separate holy sanctuary, and enclosed courtyard:

the entire interval from dawn to evening is given up by them to spiritual exercises. For they read the holy scriptures and draw out in thought and allegory their ancestral philosophy, since they regard the literal meanings as symbols of an inner and hidden nature revealing itself in covert ideas.

— De Vita Contemplativa, para. 28

On the seventh day the Therapeutae met in a meeting house, the men on one side of an open partition, and the women on the other, to hear discourses. Once in seven weeks they meet for a night-long vigil after a banquet where they served one another, for "they are not waited on by slaves, because they deem any possession of servants whatever to be contrary to nature. For she has begotten all men alike free" (De Vita Contemplativa, para.70) and sing antiphonal hymns until dawn.

== Testament of Job ==
The pseudepigraphic Testament of Job is seen as possibly a Therapeutae text.

== Early Christian interpretations ==
The 3rd-century Christian writer Eusebius of Caesarea (c. 263–339), in his Ecclesiastical History, identified Philo's Therapeutae as the first Christian monks, identifying their renunciation of property, chastity, fasting, and solitary lives with the cenobitic ideal of the Christian monks.

The 4th-century Christian heresiologist Epiphanius of Salamis (c. 315–403), bishop of Salamis in Cyprus, author of the Panarion, or Medicine Chest against Heresies, misidentified Philo's Therapeuate as "Jessaens" and considered them a Christian group.

The 5th-century Christian writer Pseudo-Dionysius, following Philo, interprets that "Some people gave to the ascetics the name 'Therapeutae' or servants while some others gave them the name monks". Pseudo-Dionysius interprets Philo's group as a highly organized Christian ascetic order, and the meaning of the name "Therapeutae" as "servants".

== Theory of Buddhist influence ==
Some authors have pointed out similarities between the Therapeutae and early Buddhist monasticism, a tradition that is several centuries older. As described in the 1st century CE text Periplus of the Erythraean Sea, Egypt had intense trade and cultural contacts with India during the period which, combined with evidence in the Indian Edicts of Ashoka of Buddhist missionary activity to the Mediterranean around 250 BCE, has led to the hypothesis that Therapeutae might have been a Buddhist sect composed of descendants of Ashoka's emissaries.

Ullrich Kleinhempel sees many similarities with Philo's account and Buddhist monastic life including abstaining from alcohol, all night vigils, and the inclusion of women in the monastic order, though he argues they were likely "a syncretistic group":

A certain degree of syncretism may be assumed in this movement due to the distance from the core lands of Buddhism, as observable elsewhere in history of religions, with a lower degree of doctrinal control. The preserved Buddhist meditation practice and monastic structure of the movement practice possibly went along with a variety of Platonic, Jewish, Stoic and other convictions among the multi-ethnic adherents of these groups. Their socio-cultural make-up may not be very far off from that of eclectic spiritual practitioners of modern cosmopolitan areas, as the syncretistic documents preserved from this age suggest.

Linguist Zacharias P. Thundy suggests that the word "Therapeutae" may represent a Hellenistic corruption of "Theravada", the school of Buddhism based on the Pali Canon.

== See also ==
- Desert Fathers
- Essenes
- Hellenistic Judaism
- Hemerobaptists
- Jewish Christianity
- Synagogal Judaism
- Magarites
- Monasticism
