= Hypsistarians =

Ancient Mediterranean religious sect

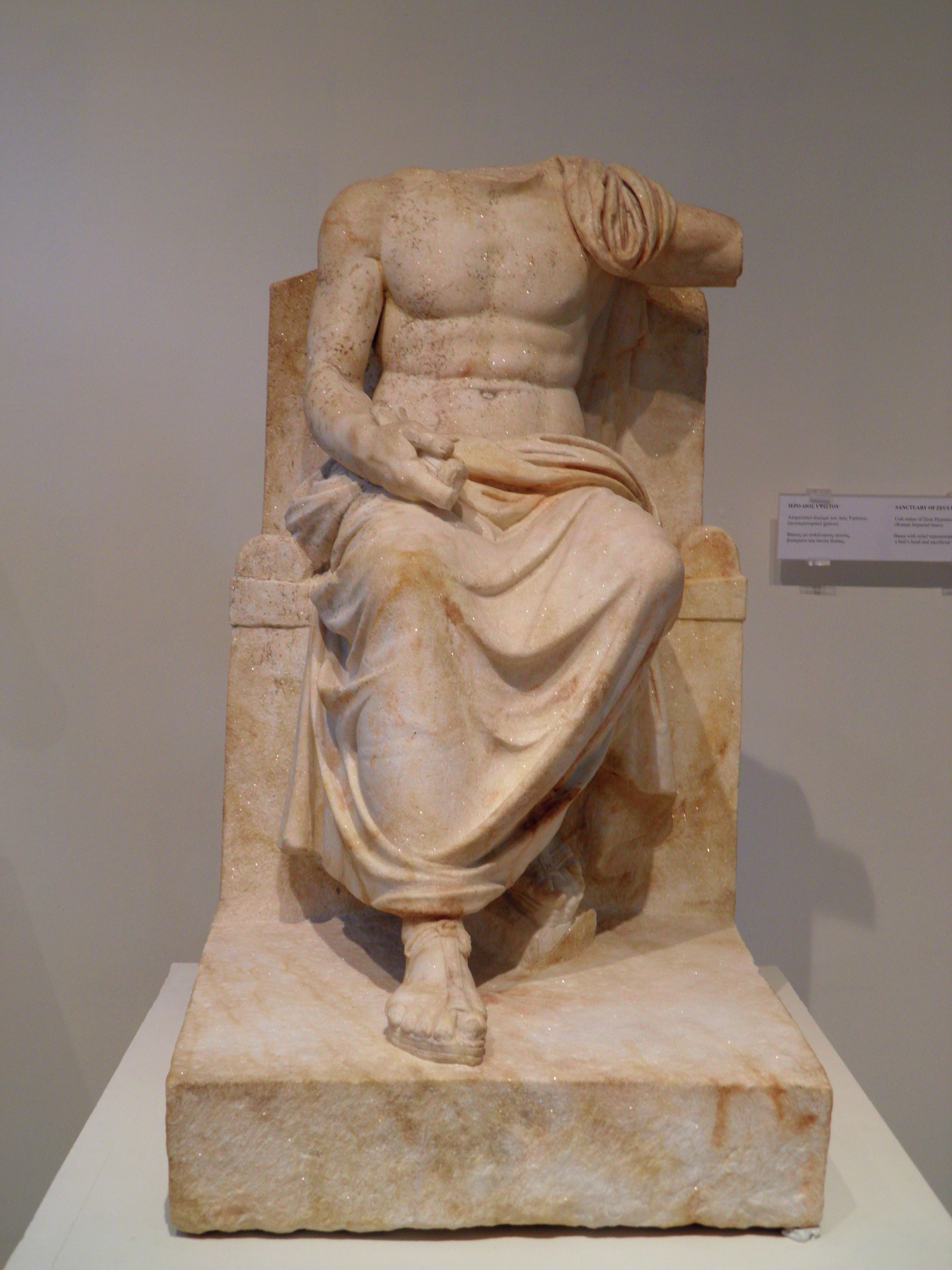
Cult statue of Zeus Hypsistos, from the sanctuary of Zeus Hypsistos, Imperial Roman times, Archaeological Museum, Dion.

Hypsistarians, i.e. worshippers of the Hypsistos (Greek: Ὕψιστος, the "Most High" God), and similar variations of the term first appear in the writings of Gregory of Nazianzus (Orat. xviii, 5) and Gregory of Nyssa (Refutation of Eunomius' Confession 38), about AD 374. The term has been linked to a body of inscriptions that date from around 100 AD to around 400 AD, mostly small votive offerings, but also including altars and stelae, dedicated to Theos Hypsistos, or sometimes simply Hypsistos, mainly found in Asia Minor (Cappadocia, Bithynia and Pontus) and the Black Sea coasts that are today part of Russia.

Some modern scholars identify the group, or groups, with God-fearers mentioned in the Acts of the Apostles, non-Jewish (gentile) sympathizers with Second Temple Judaism.

== Evidence ==
=== Inscriptions and archeology ===
A late 3rd century CE shrine in a wall of the ancient city of Oenoanda provides the strongest archaeological evidence for this cult. It is adorned with an inscription adapting a declaration of the Apollonian oracle in Didyma, describing the god as, "Self-begotten, un-taught, un-mothered, undisturbed, not permitting a name, many-named, dwelling in fire." Another inscription below the first dedicates a lantern to the Most High God. Another proof for the existence of the Hypsistarians is also found in the city of Oenoanda in the form of another epigraph close to the location of the shrine: the epigraph, dedicated by Chromatis, involves a vow to the Most High God and illustrates a practice of prayer at dawn, which aligns with the oracle's description and possibly suggests a form of henotheistic worship practice.

More archaeological finds may be related to the presence of Hypsistarians. In what is now North Macedonia, the evidence for the presence of Hypsistarians includes three inscriptions from the Valley of the River Vardar, dated to the 2nd century AD. Here there are two altars with reliefs of eagles and a statuette of an eagle, which have not been previously connected to the cult but are considered indicative. Out of twenty-five inscriptions in the region, nineteen are devoted to Zeus Hypsistos (another name for the Hypsistarian God) and six to Theos Hypsistos, showing the local significance and development of the cult. In Phrygia, numerous small rural altars decorated with agricultural motifs, such as ears of wheat and grapes, indicate local worship practices. In the Bosporan Kingdom, several inscriptions and enrollment lists from Tanais and manumission inscriptions in Gorgippia and Panticapaeum demonstrate the existence of Jewish and syncretic pagan cults. In Athens, around 20 votive plaques and altars dedicated to Zeus Hypsistos found on the Pnyx hill highlight a healing cult associated with Hypsistos, with most dedications made by women. Throughout Anatolia, a great number of votive tablets and other inscriptions are evidence that referring to one or more gods as Most High (Hypsistos, often as Theos Hypsistos 'god most high', or as Zeus or Attis, but frequently unnamed) was widespread.

However, it is not certain that all of these inscriptions are actually related to the Hypsistarians. Indeed, calling a divinity "the highest" may just have been a form of emphasising how unique that divinity is, without excluding the possibility that other divinities are unique in their way, too.

=== Ancient authors ===
The name Hypsistarioi first occurs in Gregory of Nazianzus (Orat., xviii, 5) and the name Hypsistianoi in Gregory of Nyssa (Contra Eunom., II), about 374 CE.

Gregory of Nazianzus describes a syncretic Jewish-pagan group that does not worship idols, reveres lamps and fire, and worships the Almighty (Pantokrator). They keep Sabbath and adhere to dietary restrictions, but they do not circumcise. Gregory of Nazianzus' description of this cult occurs in his eulogy for his father, who was a Hypsistarian before his conversion to Christianity:

Τῆς μὲν γὰρ τὰ εἴδωλα καὶ τὰς θυσίας ἀποπεμπόμενοι, τιμῶσι τὸ πῦρ καὶ τὰ λύχνα· τῆς δὲ τὸ Σάββατον αἰδούμενοι, καὶ τὴν περὶ τὰ βρώματα ἔστιν ἂ μικρολογίαν, τὴν περιτομὴν ἀτιμάζουσιν. Ὑψιστάριοι τοῖς ταπεινοῖς ὄνομα, καὶ ὁ Παντοκράτωρ δὴ μόνος αὐτοῖς σεβάσμιος.

For, on the one side, they reject idols and sacrifices, but reverence fire and lights; on the other, they observe the Sabbath and petty regulations as to certain meats, but despise circumcision. These lowly men call themselves Hypsistarii, and the Almighty is, so they say, the only object of their worship.

— Gregory of Nazianzus, Orat., xviii, 5

Gregory of Nyssa gives the following information:

But if he is inventing some other God besides the Father, let him dispute with the Jews or with those who are called Hypsistiani, between whom and the Christians there is this difference, that they acknowledge that there is a God Whom they term the Highest or Almighty, but do not admit that he is Father[.]

— Gregory of Nyssa, Contra Eunom., II

Persius (34-62) may have had Hypsistarians in view when he ridiculed such hybrid religionists in Satire v, 179–84:

[...] at cum
Herodis venere dies unctaque fenestra
dispositae pinguem nebulam vomuere lucernae
portantes violas rubrumque amplexa catinum
cauda natat thynni, tumet alba fidelia vino,
labra moves tacitus recutitaque sabbata palles.

But when Herod's birthday comes round, when the lamps wreathed with violets and ranged round the greasy window-sills have spat forth their thick clouds of smoke, when the floppy tunnies' tails are curled round the dishes of red ware, and the white jars are swollen out with wine, you silently twitch your lips, turning pale at the sabbath of the circumcised.

— Persius, Satire v, 179–84

Tertullian (c. 160 – c. 225 AD) seems to refer to them in Ad nationes, I, xiii:

Alii plane humanius solem Christianum deum aestimant, quod innotuerit ad orientis partem facere nos precationem, uel die solis laetitiam curare. Quid uos minus facitis? Non plerique affectatione adorandi aliquando etiam caelestia ad solis initium labra uibratis? Vos certe estis, qui etiam in laterculum septem dierum solem recepistis, et ex diebus ipsorum praelegistis, quo die lauacrum subtrahatis aut in uesperam differatis, aut otium et prandium curetis. Quod quidem facitis exorbitantes et ipsi a uestris ad alienas religiones : Iudaei enim festi sabbata et cena pura et Iudaici ritus lucernarum et ieiunia cum azymis et orationes litorales, quae utique aliena sunt a diis uestris. Quare, ut ab excessu reuertar, qui solem et diem eius nobis exprobratis, agnoscite uicinitatem : non longe a Saturno et sabbatis uestris sumus!

Others, with greater regard to good manners, it must be confessed, suppose that the sun is the god of the Christians, because it is a well-known fact that we pray towards the east, or because we make Sunday a day of festivity. What then? Do you do less than this? Do not many among you, with an affectation of sometimes worshipping the heavenly bodies likewise, move your lips in the direction of the sunrise? It is you, at all events, who have even admitted the sun into the calendar of the week; and you have selected its day, in preference to the preceding day as the most suitable in the week for either an entire abstinence from the bath, or for its postponement until the evening, or for taking rest and for banqueting. By resorting to these customs, you deliberately deviate from your own religious rites to those of strangers. For the Jewish feasts on the Sabbath and "the Purification," and Jewish also are the ceremonies of the lamps, and the fasts of unleavened bread, and the "littoral prayers," all which institutions and practices are of course foreign from your gods. Wherefore, that I may return from this digression, you who reproach us with the sun and Sunday should consider your proximity to us. We are not far off from your Saturn and your days of rest.

— Tertullian, Ad nationes, I, xiii

== Interpreting the evidence ==
=== Interpretations out of a pagan context ===
Not all of the above-described evidence may actually relate to the cult of Theos Hypsistos as practiced by the Hypsistarians.

The oracle text at Oenoanda is plausibly related to the Theos Hypsistos cult, but the concepts in it are also familiar from Orphism.

=== Connections to Judaism ===
Some modern scholars identify the group, or groups, with God-fearers mentioned in the Acts of the Apostles, non-Jewish (gentile) sympathizers with Second Temple Judaism.

The main argument in favour of this hypothesis is that the evidence yields very similar descriptions for these two groups, both in terms of space and time, and in terms of their beliefs and practices (worship of a "most high" god without images, rituals with fire and lamplight, observation of some Jewish laws such as the Sabbath or dietary regulations). Critics have argued that the similarities are too unspecific, or that either the Hypsistos worshippers or the God-fearers were not a coherent group.

Contemporary Hellenistic use of hypsistos as a religious term appears to be derived from and compatible with the term as appears in the Septuagint, from a much earlier date. (Greek ὕψιστος (hypsistos) translates Hebrew עליון (elyon), meaning "highest". This term occurs more than fifty times as a substitution for the Tetragrammaton (the name of God) or in direct relation to God (most often in the Psalms, Daniel, and Sirach).

== History ==
=== Hypotheses on origins ===
This cult may have formed as the native Cappadocian cult of Zeus Sabazios integrated with the cult of Jahve Sabaoth practiced by the numerous Jewish colonies.

=== Later history ===
The existence of Hypsistarians may have contributed to the astounding swiftness of the spread of Christianity in Asia Minor; yet not all of them accepted the new faith, and small communities of monotheists, neither Christians nor Jews, continued to exist, especially in Cappadocia.

The claim that Hypsistarians continued to exist until the ninth century relies on a mistaken interpretation of Nicephorus Const., "Antirhet. adv. Const. Copr.", I, in Migne, PG, col. 209.

== Mention by Goethe ==
After describing his difficulties with mainstream religion, Goethe laments that

...I have found no confession of faith to which I could ally myself without reservation. Now in my old age, however, I have learned of a sect, the Hypsistarians, who, hemmed in between heathens, Jews and Christians, declared that they would treasure, admire, and honour the best, the most perfect that might come to their knowledge, and inasmuch as it must have a close connection to the Godhead, pay it reverence. A joyous light thus beamed at me suddenly out of a dark age, for I had the feeling that all my life I had been aspiring to qualify as a Hypsistarian. That, however, is no small task, for how does one, in the limitations of one's individuality, come to know what is most excellent?

== See also ==
- Bana'im
- Bogomilism
- Euchites
- Hemerobaptists
- Magarites
- Maghāriya
- Sabazios

== Sources ==
- Herbermann, Charles, ed. (1913). "Hypsistarians". Catholic Encyclopedia. New York: Robert Appleton Company. Cites:
  - Lévi, Israel (1898-01-01). "Bibliographie - Notes et extraits divers - La propagande juive aux environs de l'ère chrétienne et le culte du Dieu suprême". Revue des Études Juives (in French). 36 (36–71): 115–143. Cites:
    - Schürer, Emil (1897). "Die Juden im bosporanischen Reiche und die Genossenschaften der sebomenoi ton theon ebendaselbst". Sitzungsberichte der königlich preussischen Akademie der Wissenschaften zu Berlin. XIII: 200–225.
    - Cumont, Franz (1897), Hypsistos (in French), Brussels. Supplement to the journal Revue de l'instruction publique en Belgique.
  - Buresh, Klaros (Leipzig, 1889).
  - Drexler (1890). "Hypsistos". In Roscher, Wilhelm Heinrich (ed.). Ausführliches Lexikon der griechischen und römischen Mythologie (in German). Leipzig.
  - Stokes (1877–1887). "Hypsistarii". In Wace, Henry; Smith, William (eds.). Dictionary of Christian Biography, Literature, Sects and Doctrines. London: John Murray.
- Athanassiadi, Polymnia; Frede, Michael (1999), Pagan Monotheism in Late Antiquity.
- Boerner, Peter, ed. (1981), Johann Wolfgang von Goethe 1832/1982: A Biographical Essay, Bonn: Inter Nationes.
- Mitchell, Steven; Van Nuffelen, Peter (2010), One God: Pagan Monotheism in the Roman Empire, Cambridge University Press, ISBN 978-0-521-19416-7.
