= Bana'im =

Jewish minor sect during the Second Temple period

Bana'im were a minor Jewish sect and an offshoot of the Essenes during the second century in Palestine. Other minor sects of Judaism include Hypsistarians, Hemerobaptists and the Maghāriya. The name Bana'im occurs only in Mikva'ot 9:6. The Bana'im put heavy emphasis on the cleanliness of clothing, they believed that garments cannot even have a small mudstain before dipping in purifying water. There exists considerable debate around their activities and the meaning of the name, some believe that they would put heavy emphasis on the study of the creation of the world, while some believe that the Bana'im were an Essene order employed with the ax and shovel. Other scholars instead have suggested that the name of the Bana'im is derived from the Greek word for "bath". In this case the sect would be similar to the Hemerobaptists or Tovelei Shaḥarit.
