= Magarites =

Former Jewish sect

The Magharians (Arabic: Al-Maghariyyah, 'people of the caves') or Maghāriya were a pre-Christian and proto-Gnostic Jewish sect founded in the 1st century BCE. The primary source for the existence of this group is references in the 10th century from Jacob Qirqisani.

The group apparently earned its name because it stored its books in caves, including the writings of an individual known as "the Alexandrinian" and a later work called Sefer Yadu'a. It possessed peculiar commentaries on the Bible and, in contrast to the Sadducees, rejected all anthropomorphic representations of God. The Magharians believed that God, being too sublime to interact with matter directly, created the world through an intermediary power—an angel who acted as God's representative (see demiurge and Ptahil). The sect attributed all anthropomorphic expressions about God found in the Bible to this angel, including communications to prophets.

Abraham Harkavy and others identify the Magharians with the Essenes, and the author referred to as the "Alexandrinian" with Philo (whose affinity for the Essenes is well-known), based on the following evidence:

1. The sect's name, which, in his view, does not refer to its books but to its followers who lived in caves or desert areas—an established Essene lifestyle;
2. The sect's founding date coinciding with that of the Essenes;
3. The angelic theory aligning with Essene beliefs, as well as Philo's concept of the Logos;
4. Qirqisani's omission of the Essenes from his list of Jewish sects, which can be explained if he considered the Magharians to be synonymous with the Essenes.

Harkavy and others sometimes identify them with the Therapeutae.

== See also ==
- Bana'im, another minor Jewish sect
- Hypsistarians
- Hemerobaptists, another minor Jewish sect
