= Hemerobaptists =

Ancient Jewish sect

Hemerobaptists (Greek: 'day bathers') were a Jewish sect mentioned by some early Christian writers. They were known for their daily ritual baptisms for purification, distinct from mainstream Jewish practices of ritual immersion. They are considered one of several minor Jewish sects, including the Bana'im and the Maghāriya.

== Historical references ==
Hegesippus mentions seven sects of the Jews, one of them was the Hemerobaptists. The sect was also mentioned by Justin Martyr referring to them as "baptizers".

In his work "Panarion" (also known as "Against Heresies"), 4th century heresiologist Epiphanius of Salamis described the Hemerobaptists as Jews in every sense, but unlike other sects, they believed that eternal life could only be attained if a person was baptized every day. In the Clementine Homilies (ii. 23), John the Baptist and his disciples are mentioned as Hemerobaptists.

== Scholarly analysis ==
Scholars have suggested a potential identification of the Hemerobaptists with the Tovelei Shaharit (Hebrew: טובלי שחרית, lit. 'morning bathers') mentioned in the Tosefta, though this connection is unclear, and the latter group might have been an extreme faction within the Pharisaic tradition.

Multiple scholars highlight the similarity between the Hemerobaptists and the Essenes, a Jewish sect that flourished during the late Second Temple period. Josephus wrote that the Essenes insisted on daily immersion for purification, likely just before noon (Antiquities 2.129), and the concepts of purity and sanctity of water are also mentioned in the "Community Rule" (1QS) iii.4-9, iv.21, v.13-14 and other texts, while another similarity arises from the description in the "Apostolic Constitutions": the communal meal of the Qumran community is referred to as "Taharah" in the Dead Sea Scrolls.

Although the association of the Hemerobaptists with John the Baptist is not widely accepted, the Hemerobaptists have been linked to the Mandaeans due to their shared practice of frequent baptism, and Mandaeans believing they are disciples of John the Baptist. John's followers may later have been absorbed into the early Christian church, although according to one theory, some may have gone to the Mandaeans in Lower Mesopotamia.

== See also ==
- Magarites
- Hypsistarians
