= Catholic Church in Egypt =

The Catholic Church in Egypt is considerably small as compared to the rest of the Christian population in Egypt, which is a significant minority among (mainly Sunni) Muslims. The Catholic population in Egypt is said to have begun during the British control of Egypt. However, many emigrated after the 1952 Revolution in Egypt, which also caused the overthrow and exile of King Farouk of Egypt. Catholics in Egypt belong to seven distinct ritual Particular Churches sui iuris, the largest being the Coptic Catholic Church, led by its Patriarch of Alexandria.

The majority of the Christians in Egypt are members of the Coptic Orthodox Church of Alexandria. The number of Catholics (less than 200,000) in Egypt makes up much less than 1% of the total Egyptian population, which is roughly 100 million people. Many of Egypt's Latin Catholics are of Italian or Maltese descent, while Egypt's Melkite Greek Catholics and Maronite Catholics are predominantly of Syro-Lebanese descent.

== Dioceses ==
Alexandrian Rite

- Coptic Catholic Patriarchate of Alexandria
- Coptic Catholic Eparchy of Alexandria
- Eparchy of Abu Qurqas
- Eparchy of Al Qusia
- Eparchy of Asyut
- Eparchy of Giza
- Eparchy of Ismaylia
- Eparchy of Luxor
- Eparchy of Minya
- Eparchy of Sohag

Roman Rite

- Latin Catholic Apostolic Vicariate of Alexandria of Egypt

Antiochian Rite

- Maronite Catholic Eparchy of Cairo
- Syrian Catholic Eparchy of Cairo

Armenian Rite

- Armenian Catholic Eparchy of Iskanderiya (Alexandria)

Byzantine Rite

- Melkite Patriarchal Dependent Territory of Egypt, Sudan, and South Sudan

Chaldean Rite

- Chaldean Catholic Eparchy of Cairo

== Cathedrals and Basilicas ==
- (Conventual) Basilica of St. Therese of the Child Jesus in Cairo, Egypt (Roman Catholic Apostolic Vicariate of Alexandria of Egypt)
- Cathedral Basilica of Our Lady of Fatima in Cairo, Egypt (Chaldean Catholic Eparchy of Cairo)
- Cathedral of Christ the King in Minya, Egypt (Coptic Catholic Eparchy of Minya)
- Cathedral of Christ the King in Sohag, Egypt (Coptic Catholic Eparchy of Sohag)
- Cathedral of Our Lady of Egypt in Cairo, Egypt (Coptic Catholic Patriarchate of Alexandria)
- Cathedral of St. Catherine in Alexandria, Egypt (Latin Catholic Apostolic Vicariate of Alexandria of Egypt)
- Cathedral of St. Mark in Ismaïlia, Egypt (Coptic Catholic Eparchy of Ismayliah)
- Cathedral of the Annunciation in Cairo, Egypt (Armenian Catholic Eparchy of Iskanderiya)
- Cathedral of the Dormition in Alexandria, Egypt (Greek-Melkite Catholic Territory Dependent on the Patriarch of Egypt and Sudan)
- Cathedral of the Mother of Divine Love in Assiut, Egypt (Coptic Catholic Eparchy of Assiut)
- Cathedral of the Resurrection in Cairo, Egypt (Greek-Melkite Catholic Territory Dependent on the Patriarch of Egypt and Sudan)
- Co-Cathedral of Our Lady of Helipolis in Cairo, Egypt (Latin Catholic Apostolic Vicariate of Alexandria of Egypt)
- Coptic Cathedral in Giza, Egypt (Coptic Catholic Eparchy of Guizeh)
- Coptic Cathedral in Luxor, Egypt (Coptic Catholic Eparchy of Luqsor)
- Maronite Cathedral of St. Joseph in Cairo, Egypt (Maronite Catholic Eparchy of Cairo)
- Syrian Cathedral of the Holy Rosary in Cairo, Egypt (Syrian Catholic Eparchy of Cairo)

== See also ==
- List of Catholic dioceses in Egypt (current, titular and former)
- List of saints from Africa
- Religion in Egypt
- Christianity in Egypt
- Coptic Orthodox Church
- Protestantism in Egypt
- List of cathedrals in Egypt
