= Sarraf =

Sarraf or al-Sarraf (Arabic: الصرّاف; Persian: صرّاف) is an Arabic and Persian surname. It translates to money changer. It is considered an occupational surname. Notable people with the surname include:

- Ardavan Sarraf, American musician and singer-songwriter, co-founder of Emmy award winning Beatles tribute The Fab Four
- Hossein Simaee Sarraf (born 1968), Iranian academic, lawyer, and politician
- Pawan Sarraf (born 2000), Nepalese cricketer
- Yacoub Sarraf (born 1961), Lebanese politician
- Youssef Ibrahim Sarraf (1940–2006), Egyptian Chaldean bishop
- Zaki al-Sarraf (1932–1996), Iraqi poet and writer

== See also ==
- Sarafian
