= Apostolic visitor =

Papal representative for a short investigation

In the Catholic Church, an apostolic visitor (or Apostolic Visitator; Italian: Visitatore apostolico) is a papal representative with a transient mission to perform a canonical visitation of relatively short duration. The visitor is deputed to investigate a special circumstance in a diocese or country, and to submit a report to the Holy See at the conclusion of the investigation.

== History ==
Apostolic visitors are church officials whom canonists commonly class with papal legates. Visitors differ from other Apostolic delegates, principally in this, that their mission is only transient and of comparatively short duration.

In ancient times, the popes generally exercised their right of inspecting the dioceses of various countries through their nuncios or delegates (c. 1, Extravag. Comm. de Consuet. I, 1; c. 17, X, de Cens. III, 39), though they occasionally, even in the primitive ages, sent special visitors.

In the modern time, the mission of papal nuncios is rather of a diplomatic than of a visitatorial character. Visitors are, however, deputed by the pope for special emergencies and not at stated intervals. Their duty is to inspect the state of the Church in the country confided to them and then to draw up a report to the Holy See. At times, this visitation is made with the same attention to details as is an episcopal visitation.

== Regular clergy ==
Visitors Apostolic are also appointed to visit the various provinces of a religious order, whenever, in the judgment of the pope, this becomes useful or necessary. In all cases of Apostolic visitation, the pope, through delegates, is putting into effect the supreme and immediate jurisdiction which is his for any and every part of the Church. The exact powers of a visitor can be known only from his brief of delegation. His office ceases as soon as he has submitted his report to the Holy See through the Consistorial Congregation.

== The Commission of the Apostolic Visitation ==
For the city of Rome itself there is a permanent Commission of the Apostolic Visitation. Established by Urban VIII as one of the Roman congregations under the presidency of the cardinal vicar, it was changed into a commission by Pope Pius X through the Constitution "Sapienti Consilio" (29 June 1908). These Apostolic visitors annually inspect the parishes and institutions of Rome and report on their spiritual and financial condition. They pay special attention to the fulfilment of the obligations springing from pious foundations and legacies for Masses and chaplaincies.

== Eastern Catholic Apostolic Visitors ==
In Eastern Catholic (non-Latin) churches, the office of apostolic visitor can be indefinite and the closest thing to an ordinary for communities in regions which have not (yet) been organized into any ordinary jurisdiction. Although there is a history of apostolic visitors in the Belarusian Greek Catholic Church, Eastern Catholic apostolic visitors are generally found in the major Eastern Catholic churches.

=== Armenian Catholic Church ===
Since 1986, the Armenian Catholic eparchs of Paris (whose eparchy covers all of France) have served as Apostolic Visitor in Western Europe of the Armenians:

=== Apostolic Visitors in the Belarusian Greek Catholic Church ===
Because the Belarusian Greek Catholic Church (Byzantine Rite) remains unorganized in terms of structural polity, with no proper jurisdictions of its own erected, since 1960 the Pope has entrusted the pastoral care of Belarusian Greek Catholics to a series of Apostolic Visitors. These apostolic visitors have thus served as the only hierarchs of the Belarusian Greek Catholic Church during this time period.

=== Chaldean Catholic Church ===
The Chaldean Catholic Church has had an Apostolic Visitor in Europe of the Chaldeans since 2005.

=== Melkite Greek Catholic Church ===
The Melkite Greek Catholic Church currently has one apostolic visitor.

=== Romanian Greek Catholic Church ===
The Romanian Greek Catholic Church currently has one apostolic visitor, Cristian Dumitru Crișan.

=== Slovak Greek Catholic Church ===
As of November 2024, Slovak Greek Catholic Church has had one apostolic visitor.

=== Syriac Catholic Church ===
The Syriac Catholic Church currently has two Apostolic Visitors, Archbishop Basile Georges Casmoussa (Apostolic Visitor in Western Europe, 13 January 2014 – 21 June 2017; Apostolic Visitor in Australia, 21 June 2017 – present) and Flaviano Al-Kabalan (Apostolic Visitor in Western Europe, 21 June 2017 – present)

=== Syriac Maronite Church ===
The Syriac Maronite Church currently has five apostolic visitors:

- Bishop Georges Chihane (Eparch of Cairo, 2012–present), Apostolic Visitor in Northern Africa, 13 January 2014 – present
- Bishop Francois Eid (Procurator at Rome, 2012–2019), Apostolic Visitor in Bulgaria and Romania and Apostolic Visitor in Greece, 13 April 2015 – 11 October 2018
- Archbishop Joseph Soueif (Archbishop of Cyprus, 2008–present), Apostolic Visitor in Greece, 11 October 2018 – present
- Bishop Michel Aoun (Eparch of Byblos, 2012–present), Apostolic Visitor in Bulgaria and Romania, 11 October 2018 – present
- Bishop Nasser Gemayel (Eparch of Paris, 2012–present), Apostolic Visitor in Western and Northern Europe, 21 July 2012 – present
- Bishop Simon Faddoul (Apostolic Exarch of Western and Central Africa, 2014–2018; Eparch of the Annunciation, 2018–present), Apostolic Visitor in Southern Africa, 13 January 2014 – present

=== Syro-Malabar Catholic Church ===
The Syro-Malabar Catholic Church has had a number of apostolic visitors over the last several decades, including two at present:

- Bishop Stephen Chirappanath (Procurator at Rome, 2012–present), Apostolic Visitor for the Syro-Malabar Faithful in Europe, 28 July 2016 – present (Note: Chirappanath has been Procurator at Rome since 2012, but was not appointed a bishop until his appointment as Apostolic Visitor in Europe in 2016.)
- Father Jolly Vadakken, Apostolic Visitor for the Syro-Malabar Faithful in the Arabian Peninsula
- Former Visitations
  - Archbishop Antony Padiyara (Metropolitan Archbishop of Changanaserry, 1970–1985), Apostolic Visitor in India outside the proper territory, 8 September 1978 – 23 April 1985 (Note: Padiyara was elected Metropolitan of Ernakulam on April 23, 1985, and later became the first Major Archbishop of Ernakulam-Angamaly and a Cardinal.)
  - Bishop Gratian Mundadan (Eparch of Bijnor, 1977–2009), Apostolic Visitor in India outside the proper territory, 15 July 2006 – 11 January 2014
  - Bishop Raphael Thattil (Auxiliary Bishop of Thrissur, 2010–2017), Apostolic Visitor in India outside the proper territory, 11 January 2014 – 10 October 2017 (Note: The Syro-Malabar Catholic Eparchy of Shamshabad was established on October 10, 2017, with Bishop Thattil as its first apostolic exarch. The establishment of this eparchy, along with that of Hosur on the same day, marked the conclusion of the Syro-Malabar apostolic visitation in India, with the entire territory of India finally covered by Syro-Malabar ordinaries.)
  - Bishop Jacob Angadiath (Eparch of Chicago, 2001–2022), Apostolic Visitor in Canada, 16 February 2001 – 6 August 2015 (Note: The Syro-Malabar Apostolic Exarchate of Canada was established on August 6, 2015, with Bishop Jose Kalluvelil as its first apostolic exarch.)
  - Bishop Bosco Puthur (Eparch of Melbourne, 2013–2023), Apostolic Visitor in New Zealand, 23 December 2013 – 29 March 2021 (Note: The Eparchy of Melbourne terittory was extended to include New Zealand and Oceania on March 29, 2021.)

=== Syro-Malankara Catholic Church ===
The Syro-Malankara Catholic Church has had a number of apostolic visitors over the last few decades, three of whom served as apostolic visitors for two different regions simultaneously. Partly due to the canonical erection of several new eparchies and apostolic exarchates. There is currently two Apostolic Visitors with Episcopal dignity.

- Bishop Kuriakose Mar Osthatheos Apostolic Visitor Europe, 6 December 2025 - present, Based in Coventry, England
- Bishop Antony Mar Silvanos (Bishop of the Curia, 2022-present), Apostolic Visitor to Oceania 15 July 2023 - present
- Former Visitations
  - Bishop Jacob Mar Barnabas, Apostolic Visitor in India outside the proper territory, 7 February 2007 – 26 March 2015 (Note: On March 26, 2015, all of the territory previously under the care of Jacob Mar Barnabas as Apostolic Visitor in India outside the proper territory was organized into the Eparchy of Gurgaon and the Apostolic Exarchate of Khadki. Jacob Mar Barnabas was appointed the first Bishop of Gurgaon, and Thomas Mar Anthonios the first Apostolic Exarch of Khadki.)
  - Bishop Isaac Mar Cleemis (Auxiliary Bishop of Trivandrum, 2001–2003), Apostolic Visitor in North America and Apostolic Visitor in Europe, 18 June 2001 – 11 September 2003. (Note: Isaac Mar Cleemis was appointed Bishop of Tiruvalla on September 11, 2003, and later became the first Metropolitan Archbishop of Tiruvalla before being elected Major Archbishop of Trivandrum in 2007, at which point he took the name Baselios Cleemis.)
  - Bishop Joseph Mar Thomas (Auxiliary Bishop of Trivandrum, 2005–2010), Apostolic Visitor in North America and Apostolic Visitor in Europe, 5 January 2005 – 25 January 2010.
  - Bishop Thomas Mar Eusebius (Apostolic Exarch of the United States, 2010–2016; Eparch of the United States and Canada, 2016–2017), Apostolic Visitor in Canada, 14 July 2010 – 4 January 2016; (Note: The Syro-Malankara Catholic Apostolic Exarchate of the United States was established on July 14, 2010, the same day that Thomas Mar Eusebius was appointed to be its first bishop. He was also simultaneously appointed Apostolic Visitor in Canada. On January 4, 2016, the apostolic exarchate was promoted as the Syro-Malankara Catholic Eparchy of the United States and Canada, with its jurisdiction now extended to also include Canada.) Apostolic Visitor in Europe, 14 July 2010 – 5 August 2017.
  - Bishop Yoohanon Mar Theodosius (Bishop of the Curia, 2017–2022; Eparch of Muvattupuzha, 2022 - present), Apostolic Visitor in Europe, 5 August 2017 – 22 November 2025; Apostolic Visitator in Oceania, 5 August 2017 - 15 July 2023.

=== Ukrainian Greek Catholic Church ===
The Ukrainian Greek Catholic Church had several apostolic visitors in Western Europe after the end of World War II and currently has three apostolic visitors:

- Archbishop Ivan Buchko, Apostolic Visitor in Western Europe, 28 July 1945 – 29 September 1971
- Bishop Myroslav Marusyn, Apostolic Visitor in Western Europe, 27 June 1974 – 14 September 1982
- Bishop Hlib Lonchyna (Procurator at Rome, 2003–2006; Eparch of London, 2009–2019), (Note: Lonchyna was originally appointed Apostolic Administrator of the Ukrainian Apostolic Exarchate of Great Britain on June 2, 2009, and was subsequently named Apostolic Exarch on June 14, 2011. He later became the first bishop of the Eparchy of the Holy Family of London when the Apostolic Exarchate was promoted on January 18, 2013.) Apostolic Visitor in Italy, 14 January 2003 – 7 January 2009; Apostolic Visitor in Spain, 4 March 2004 – 7 January 2009; Apostolic Visitor in Ireland, 4 March 2004 – 4 July 2022
- Bishop Kenneth Nowakowski (Eparchy of London, 2020 - present) Apostolic Visitor in Ireland 4 July 2022 - Present
- Bishop Dionisio Lachovicz, Apostolic Visitor in Italy and Spain, 19 January 2009 – present
- Bishop Daniel Kozelinski Netto (Eparch of Buenos Aires, 2011–present), (Note: Kozelinski Netto was originally appointed Apostolic Administrator of the Eparchy of Buenos Aires on June 22, 2011, and was subsequently named Eparch on October 8, 2016.) Apostolic Visitor in Uruguay, Paraguay, Chile, and Venezuela, 12 January 2013 – present

== See also ==
- Canonical visitation
- Provincial episcopal visitor
- Quinquennial Visit Ad Limina
