= Eparchy of Cairo =

Eparchy of Cairo may refer to:

- Maronite Catholic Eparchy of Cairo
- Chaldean Catholic Eparchy of Cairo
- Syriac Catholic Eparchy of Cairo
