= List of Catholic dioceses in Egypt =

The Catholic Church in Egypt is presently composed of an exempt Latin missionary jurisdiction and 14 Eastern Catholic (arch)eparchies (mainly the Coptic Catholic Patriarchate's province), but also yielded over 90 titular sees.

== Current dioceses ==
=== Latin ===
(Exempt, i.e. directly subject to the Holy See)

- Apostolic Vicariate of Alexandria of Egypt (Latin)

=== Eastern Catholic ===
Alexandrian Rite

- Coptic Catholic Patriarchate of Alexandria and its Egyptian suffragans :
  - Eparchy of Alexandria (Patriarch's proper eparchy)
  - Eparchy of Abu Qurqas
  - Eparchy of Al Qusia
  - Eparchy of Asyut
  - Eparchy of Giza
  - Eparchy of Ismaylia
  - Eparchy of Luxor
  - Eparchy of Minya
  - Eparchy of Sohag

Byzantine Rite

- Melkite Greek Catholic Territory Dependent on the Patriarch of Egypt, Sudan and South Sudan

Antiochian Rite

- Maronite Catholic Eparchy of Cairo
- Syriac Catholic Eparchy of Cairo (Syrian)

Armenian Rite

- Armenian Catholic Eparchy of Alexandria

Chaldean Rite

- Chaldean Catholic Eparchy of Cairo

== Former sees ==
=== Titular sees ===
- Metropolitan titular sees (one in each Late Roman province) : Antinoë (for Thebais Prima), Leontopolis in Augustamnica (for Augustamnica Secunda), Nubia *, Oxyrynchus (for Arcadia Aegypti), Pelusium (for Augustamnica Prima), Pelusium *, Ptolemais in Thebaide (for Thebais Secunda)
- Other Archiepiscopal titular sees : Damiata (Crusader see; geographically identical with Tamiathis, now Damietta)
- Episcopal titular sees : Agnus, Alphocranon, Andropolis, Antæopolis, Aphnæum, Aphroditopolis, Apollonopolis magna, Apollonopolis parva, Arabia, Arsinoë in Arcadia, Athribis, Babylon, Bubastis, Busiris, Butus, Cabasa, Casius, Cleopatris, Clysma, Coprithis, Coptus, Cusæ, Cynopolis in Ægypto, Cynopolis in Arcadia, Diocletianoplis in Thebaide, Diospolis inferior, Diospolis superior, Geras, Heliopolis in Augustamnica, Hephæstus, Heracleopolis magna, Hermonthis, Hermopolis parva, Hypselis, Iotapa in Palestina, Latopolis, Letopolis, Mareotes, Massimianopolis in Thebaide, Memphis, Menelaites, Metelis, Naucratis, Nicius, Nilopolis, Oasis magna, Ombi, Onuphis, Ostracine, Pachnemunis, Panephysis, Panopolis, Paralus, Petra in Ægypto, Phacusa, Pharan, Pharbæthus, Phatanus, Phelbes, Philæ, Phragonis, Pselchis, Rhinocorura, Sais, Sata, Schedia, Sebennytus, Sela, Sethroë, Syene, Tamiathis (now Damietta; geographically identical with Damiata), Tanasia, Tanis, Taua, Tentyris, Terenuthis, Thennesus, Theodosiopolis in Arcadia, Thinis, Thmuis, Thois, Xois, Zygris
- Titular Apostolic Vicariates (both Latin and merged as titles with co-cathedrals into the residential Latin Apostolic Vicariate of Alexandria) : Heliopolis of Egypt (a Cairo suburb) and Port-Said (Suez Canal port)

=== Other ===
(incomplete?)

- Latin Patriarchate of Alexandria (long titular before its suppression, originally a diocese)

== See also ==
- Catholic Church in Egypt

== Sources and external links ==
- GCatholic.org with see - and incumbent biography links.
- Catholic-Hierarchy entry.
