= St. Catherine's Cathedral =

St. Catherine's Cathedral may refer to:

- St. Catherine's Cathedral, Alexandria, Egypt
- St. Catherine's Cathedral, Utrecht, Netherlands
- St. Catherine's Cathedral, Kherson, Ukraine
