= Apostolic Vicariate of Port-Said =

Latin Catholic missionary in Egypt

The Apostolic Vicariate of Port-Said (originally of the Suez Canal) was a Latin Catholic missionary pre-diocesan jurisdiction in eastern Egypt.

It was exempt, i.e., directly dependent on the Holy See, and not part of any ecclesiastical province.

== History ==
Established on 12 July 1926 as Apostolic Vicariate of Suez Canal (Canal of Suez / Canale di Suez in Curiate Italiano), on territory split off from the Apostolic Vicariate of Egypt.

Renamed on 1951.01.27 as Apostolic Vicariate of Port-Said, after its see (Porto Said in Italian)

United on 1987.11.30 by merger (remaining as title of) back in its mother, the Apostolic Vicariate of Alexandria of Egypt). Its former cathedral see, Notre dame and St. Michael, remains a Co-cathedral.

== Episcopal ordinaries ==
(all Roman Rite)

Apostolic Vicar of Suez Canal

- Victor Colomban Dreyer, Capuchin Franciscans (O.F.M. Cap.) (1927.03.11 – 1928.11.24), Titular Bishop of Orthosia (1923.06.27 – 1928.11.26), previously Apostolic Vicar of Rabat (Morocco) (1923.06.27 – 1927.03.11); later Apostolic Delegate (papal diplomatic envoy) to Indochina (1928.11.24 – retired 1936.11.19), Titular Archbishop of Adulis (1928.11.26 – death 1944.05.07)

Apostolic Vicars of Port Said

- Ange-Marie-Paul Hiral, Friars Minor (O.F.M.) (1929.03.18 – death 1952.01.18), Titular Bishop of Sululos (1929.03.18 – 1952.01.18)
- René-Fernand-Bernardin Collin, O.F.M. (1952.01.18 – 1958.12.21), succeeding as former Coadjutor Apostolic Vicar of Port-Said (1949.05.26 – 1952.01.18) & Titular Bishop of Dura (1949.05.26 – 1958.12.21); later Bishop of Digne (France) (1958.12.21 – retired 1980)
- Egidio Sampieri, O.F.M. (1978.04.29 – 1987.11.30), also Titular Bishop of Ida in Mauretania (1978.04.29 – 2000.08.26), Apostolic Vicar of mother and successor jurisdiction Apostolic Vicariate of Alexandria of Egypt (Egypt) (1987.11.30 – death 2000.08.26), last Apostolic Vicar of Heliopolis of Egypt (Egypt) (1978.04.29 – suppression by merger 1987.11.30)

== See also ==
- Catholic Church in Egypt
