= Joseph Merhi =

Egyptian bishop (1912–2006)

Joseph Merhi CML
- Eparch of Cairo
- Native name: چوزيف مرعى
- Church: Maronite Church
- Diocese: Eparchy of Cairo
- In office: 24 August 1972 – 5 June 1989
- Predecessor: Pietro Dib
- Successor: Joseph Dergham

Orders
- Ordination: 13 July 1936
- Consecration: 26 August 1972 by Paul Peter Meouchi

Personal details
- Born: 18 January 1912 Mrayjat (west of Makseh), Damascus Sanjak, Vilayet of Syria, Ottoman Empire
- Died: 30 March 2006 (aged 94)

Joseph Merhi, CML (18 January 1912 in Mreijat – 30 March 2006) was an Egyptian Maronite Bishop of the Maronite Catholic Eparchy of Cairo in Egypt.

== Life ==
Joseph Merhi entered into the Congregation of Maronite Lebanese Missionaries and received his priestly ordination on 13 July 1936.

On 24 August 1972, Pope Paul VI appointed him bishop of the Eparchy of Cairo for the Maronites. His episcopal ordination was performed on 26 August 1972 by Maronite Patriarch of Antioch Paul Peter Meouchi; his co-consecrators were Nasrallah Boutros Sfeir, Titular bishop of Tarsus dei Maroniti and Archbishop Ignace Abdo Khalifé, Titutar Archbishop of Apamea in Syria dei Maroniti.

As usual in his church, he made his retirement for the completion of his 75th birthday on 5 June 1989.

On 30 March 2006, Emeritus Bishop Merhi died.
