= Apostolic Vicariate of Heliopolis of Egypt =

The Apostolic Vicariate of Heliopolis (of Egypt) (originally of the Nile Delta) was a Catholic missionary pre-diocesan jurisdiction of the Latin Church in northern Egypt.

It was exempt, i.e. directly subject to the Holy See, not part of any ecclesiastical province.

== History ==
Established on 25 January 1886 as Apostolic Prefecture of the Delta of the Nile (Curiate Italian Delta del Nilo), on territory split off from the northern part of the Apostolic Vicariate of Egypt. Augustin Duret was appointed Prefect Apostolic, and wrote an article about the Prefecture for the Catholic Encyclopedia.

Promoted on 17 September 1909 as Apostolic Vicariate of the Nile Delta; Duret was named titular bishop of Bubastis. Renamed on 27 January 1951 as Apostolic Vicariate of Heliopolis of Egypt after its see, Heliopolis, a suburb of Egyptian national capital Cairo.

On 30 November 1987, it was United with (i.e. merged in, yet remaining a title of) the Latin Apostolic Vicariate of Alexandria of Egypt. Its former cathedral episcopal see, Our Lady of Heliopolis in that suburb of the Egyptian national capital Cairo, remains a Co-cathedral of the vicariate.

== Ordinaries ==
(all Latin Church)

Apostolic Prefect of the Nile Delta

- Father Augustin Duret, Society of African Missions (S.M.A.) (1885.12.10 – 1909.09.17 see below)

Apostolic Vicars of the Nile Delta

- Augustin Duret, S.M.A. (see above 1909.09.17 - 1914.09), Titular Bishop of Bubastis (1909.09.17 – death 1920.08.29)
- Apostolic Administrator Father Jules Girard, S.M.A. (1916 – 1921.07.08 see below)
- Jules Girard, S.M.A. (see above 1921.07.08 – death 1950.03.23), Titular Bishop of Bulla regia (1921.07.08 – 1950.03.23)

Apostolic Vicars of Heliopolis (of Egypt)

- André van den Bronk, S.M.A. (1946.07.30 – 1952.05.15), Titular Bishop of Tentyris (1946.07.30 – 1952.05.15); later Bishop of Kumasi (Ghana) (1952.05.15 – 1962.02.13), Titular Bishop of Thubunæ in Numidia (1962.02.13 – 1964.02.10) & Apostolic Prefect of Parakou (Benin) (1962.02.13 – 1964.02.10), promoted first Bishop of Parakou (1964.02.10 – retired 1975.09.29)
- Noël Boucheix, S.M.A. (1953.03.11 – 1958.07.06), Titular Bishop of Bagai (1953.03.11 – 1958.07.06), later Bishop of Porto Novo (Benin) (1958.07.06 – 1969.01.01), Titular Bishop of Bahanna (1969.01.01 – retired 1976.08.06)
- Amand Hubert, S.M.A. (1959.04.07 – 1978.08), Titular Bishop of Sais (1959.04.07 – 1980.07.21)
- Egidio Sampieri, Friars Minor (O.F.M.) (1978.04.29 – 1987.11.30), Titular Bishop of Ida in Mauretania (1978.04.29 – 2000.08.26), also last Apostolic Vicar of Port-Said (Egypt) (1978.04.29 – 1987.11.30), Apostolic Vicar of successor jurisdiction Apostolic Vicariate of Alexandria of Egypt (Egypt) (1987.11.30 – 2000.08.26)

== See also ==
- Roman Catholicism in Egypt
