= François Eid =

Retired Maronite bishop (born 1943)

François Eid OMM
- Eparch of Cairo
- Native name: فرانسوا عيد
- Church: Maronite Church
- Diocese: Eparchy of Cairo
- In office: 28 December 2005 – 16 June 2012
- Predecessor: Joseph Dergham
- Successor: Georges Chihane
- Previous post: Superior General of the Mariamite Maronite Order (1999-2005)

Orders
- Ordination: 28 August 1971
- Consecration: 11 February 2006 by Nasrallah Boutros Sfeir

Personal details
- Born: 24 July 1943 (age 83) Mtolleh (northwest of Bsaba), mandatory Lebanese Republic, French Empire

François Eid, OMM (born on 24 July 1943 in Mtolleh, Lebanese Republic) is a retired Maronite Bishop of the Maronite Catholic Eparchy of Cairo and Procurator of the Maronite Patriarch at the Holy See.

== Life ==
François Eid joined the OMM of the Blessed Virgin Mary and received on 28 August 1971 his priestly ordination. In 1975 he emigrated to Montreal, Quebec, Canada. From 1999 to 2005 Eid was Superior general of his order.

Pope Benedict XVI appointed him bishop of the Eparchy of Cairo for the Maronites on 24 September 2005. His episcopal ordination was conducted by Maronite Patriarch of Antioch, Nasrallah Boutros Sfeir, on 11 February 2006; his co-consecrators were Roland Aboujaoudé, Auxiliary bishop of Antioch, and Tanios El Khoury, Eparch of Sidon.

On 16 June 2012, Eid was appointed Procurator of the Maronite Patriarch at the Holy See and resigned as Maronite Bishop of Cairo.

On 5 April 2014 Pope Francis appointed him a member of the Congregation for the Causes of Saints.

On 13 April 2015, Pope Francis appointed him Apostolic visitor for the Maronite faithful in Bulgaria, Greece and Romania.

He accepted his resignation from those posts on 11 October 2018.
