= Toma Adly Zaki =

Egyptian Coptic Catholic bishop (born 1966)

His Excellency, Most Reverend Toma Adly Zaki
- Bishop of Guizeh (Giza)
- Native name: توماس عدلي زكي
- Appointed: 25 March 2019
- Predecessor: Antonios Aziz Mina
- Previous posts: Titular Bishop of Cabasa (2018–2019); Apostolic Administrator of Guizeh (2018–2019)

Orders
- Ordination: 20 April 2001 by Antonios Naguib
- Consecration: 25 May 2018 by Ibrahim Isaac Sidrak

Personal details
- Born: Maher Adly Zaki; 5 November 1966 (age 59) Minya, Egypt
- Residence: Giza, Egypt
- Education: Pontifical Institute of Arab and Islamic Studies, Pontifical Urban University

Toma Adly Zaki (also known as Thomas Adly Zaki; born 5 November 1966) is an Egyptian Coptic Catholic hierarch who has served as the Bishop of the Eparchy of Giza since 2019. He previously served as the Titular Bishop of Cabasa and the Apostolic Administrator sede vacante of the same eparchy from 2018 to 2019.

== Early life and education ==
Maher Adly Zaki was born on 5 November 1966 in Minya, Egypt. He initially pursued secular education, graduating with a degree in civil engineering in 1988.

Feeling a religious calling, he made a theological training at the St. Leo the Great Major Coptic Catholic Seminary in Maadi and was ordained a priest for the Eparchy of Minya on 20 April 2001 by Bishop [[Antonios Naguib]]. Zaki continued his higher ecclesiastical studies in Rome, Italy, where he obtained a certificate in Islamology from the Pontifical Institute of Arab and Islamic Studies (PISAI) in 1999 and subsequently earned a licentiate in biblical theology from the Pontifical Urban University.

== Priesthood ==
Following his ordination, Zaki served from 2001 to 2003 as the deputy parish priest of the Cathedral of Minya. In 2008, he moved into academic and formative ministry, becoming a professor of Sacred Scripture and a formator at the St. Leo the Great Major Coptic Catholic Seminary in Maadi, Cairo.

He later become the rector of the seminary since 2015 until 2018. During this period, he also served as the Secretary General of the Assembly of the Catholic Hierarchy in Egypt and directed the "Saint Jerome" Centre for Bible Studies in Cairo. In addition to his native Arabic, he is fluent in Italian and English.

== Episcopal ministry ==
On 10 April 2018, Pope Francis appointed him as the Titular Bishop of Cabasa and Apostolic Administrator sede vacante of the Eparchy of Guizeh, following the resignation of Bishop Antonios Aziz Mina. Upon his appointment, he assumed the episcopal name Thomas. He received his episcopal consecration on 25 May 2018 from Coptic Catholic Patriarch Ibrahim Isaac Sidrak, with several bishops of the Coptic Catholic Synod serving as co-consecrators.

Less than a year later, on 25 March 2019, the Synod of Bishops of the Patriarchal Coptic Catholic Church officially elected Zaki as the canonical eparchial Bishop of Giza, an election assented to by Pope Francis.
