= Joseph Dergham =

- Eparch of Cairo
- Native name: چوزيف درجام
- Church: Maronite Church
- Diocese: Eparchy of Cairo
- In office: 5 June 1989 – 18 September 2005
- Predecessor: Joseph Merhi
- Successor: François Eid

Orders
- Ordination: 12 April 1959
- Consecration: 16 September 1989 by Nasrallah Boutros Sfeir

Personal details
- Born: 23 April 1930 Ebrine, mandatory, Lebanese Republic, French Empire
- Died: 28 October 2015 (aged 85)

Joseph Dergham (23 April 1930 in Ebrine, Lebanon – 28 October 2015) was a Lebanese Maronite Bishop of the Maronite Catholic Eparchy of Cairo.

== Life ==
Joseph Dergham was born in Ebrine, Lebanon. He received his priestly ordination on 12 April 1959.

On 5 April 1989 Pope John Paul II appointed him bishop of the Eparchy of Cairo of the Maronites. His episcopal ordination was on 16 September 1989, and the main consecrator was the Maronite Patriarch of Antioch, Nasrallah Boutros Sfeir; his co-consecrators were Joseph Merhi, Eparch of Cairo and Georges Abi-Saber, Titular bishop of Aradus. Dergham resigned on 18 September 2005 by limite of age and his renounce was accepted by Pope Benedict XVI.

Dergham died on 28 October 2015.
