= Boumedfaâ =

Coordinates: 36°22′13″N 2°28′35″E

Boumedfaa بومدفع ⴱⵓⵎⴻⴷⴼⴰⵄ
- Nickname: بومدفع
- Interactive map of Boumedfaa
- Country: Algeria
- Province: Aïn Defla

Population (2008)
  - Total: 28,500
- Time zone: UTC+1 (West Africa Time)

Boumedfaa (بومدفع ) a town in northern Algeria.

It is located at 36°22′13″n, 2° 28′ 35″e, 100 km west of Algiers and 60 km north-east of Aïn Defla and 37 km north-west of Médéa and 40 km west of Blida.

In 2021 the population of the district was 28 500. The population density is 860 per km^{2}.

== History ==
During the Roman Empire a town of the Roman province of Mauretania Caesariensis called Flumenzer, was located at Boumedfaâ.

During the rule of the Vandals in late antiquity, the town's Christian bishop, Paolo, was sent into exile in 484AD, by the king Huneric.

January 1, 1855, Bou Medfa merged with the township of Aïn Benian (Aïn Defla) 1869 saw the Opening of the Bou Medfa-Affreville section of the Algiers to Oran railway and branch lines

An earthquake in 1959 with magnitude 5.3 earthquake struck this area of Algeria on November 7 at a depth of 15.0 km. Some damage was caused.

=== Christian Bishopric ===
An ancient Christian bishopric was established in the town during the Roman Empire. Although the bishopric ceased to effectively function with the Muslim conquest of the Maghreb the diocese of Flumenzer survives as a titular bishop. The last bishop was Adel Zaky, apostolic vicar of Alexandria, Egypt (2009–2019).

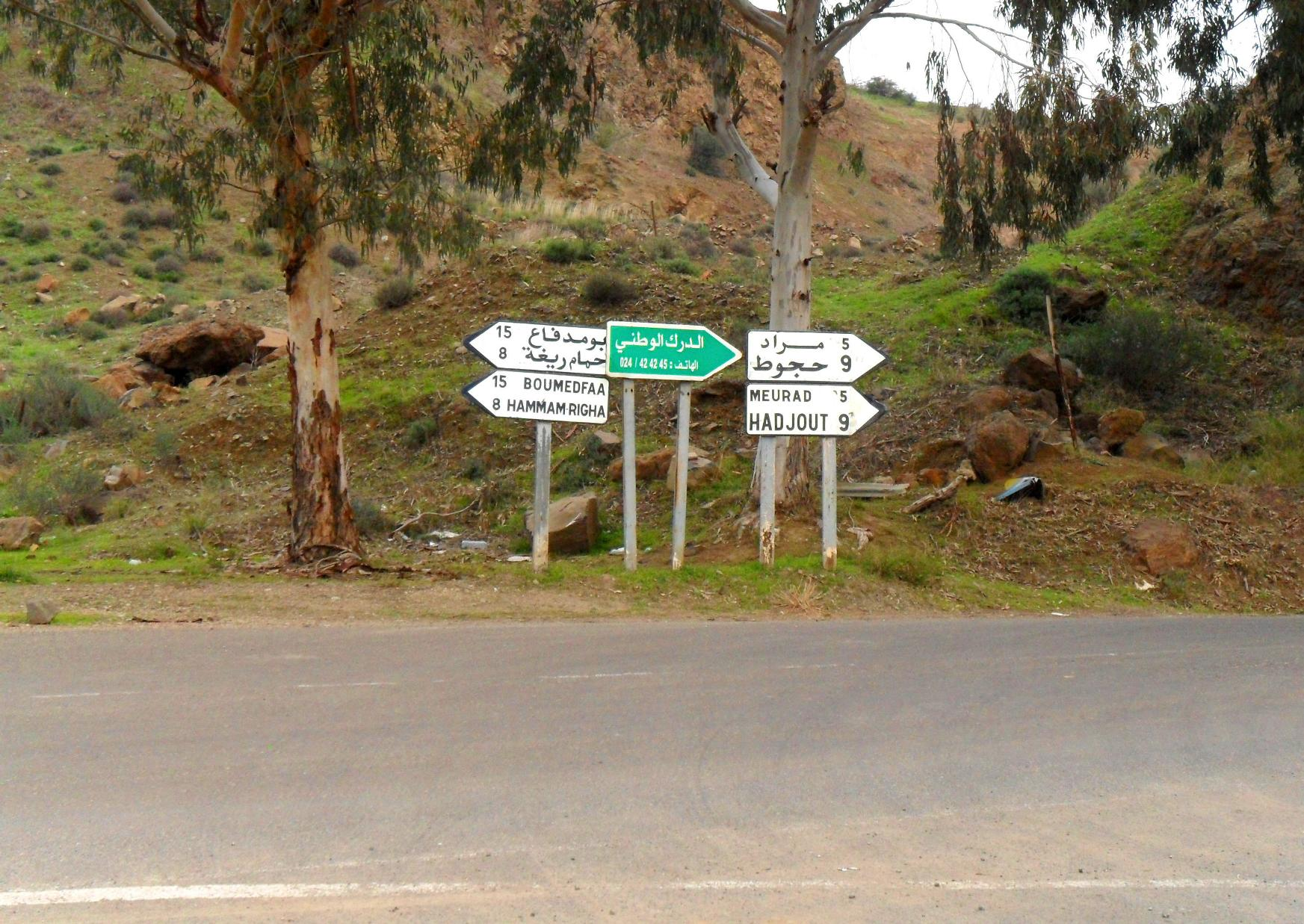
area around Meurad - Bourkika - Boumedfaa

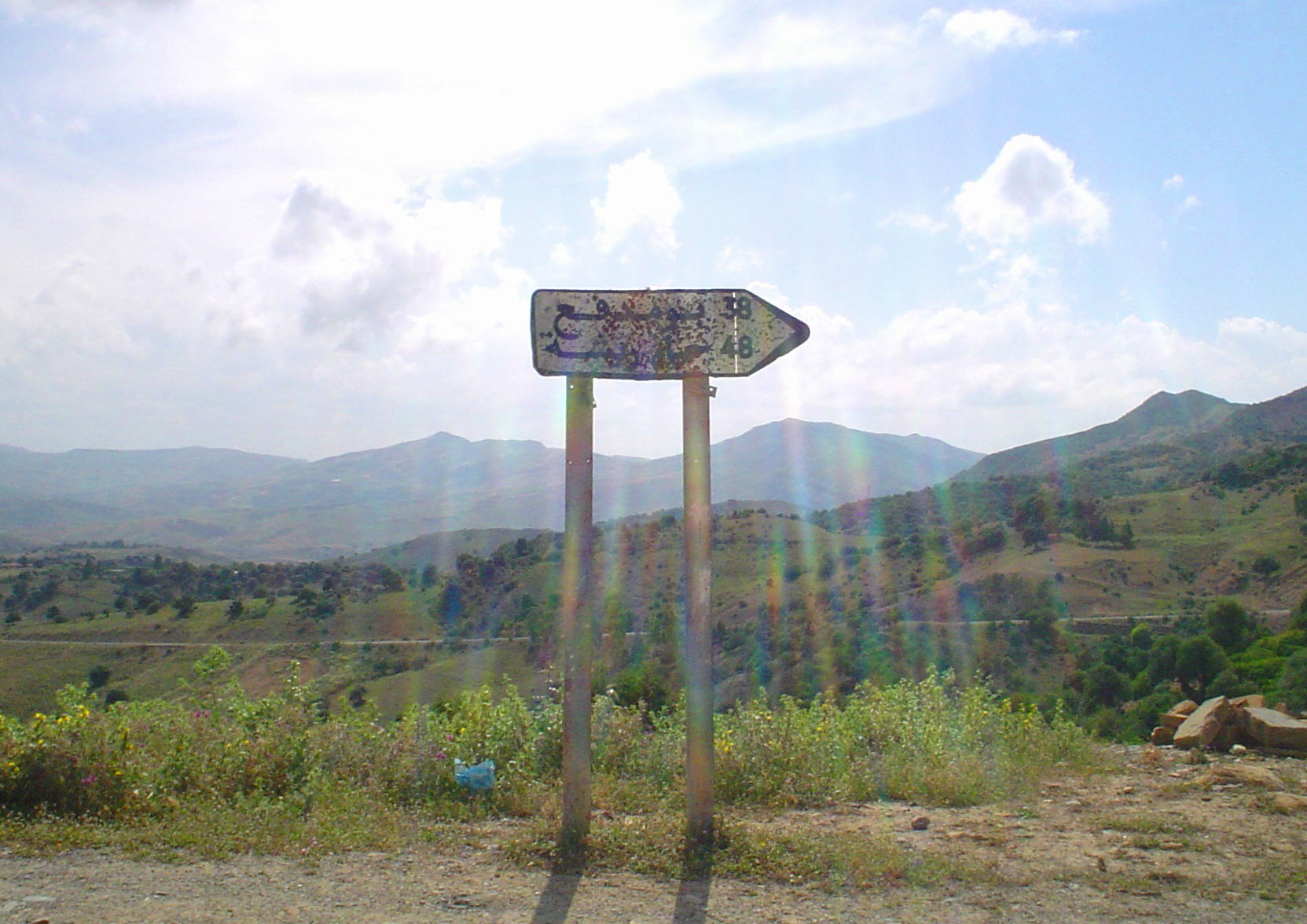
Vers Boumedfaa panorama

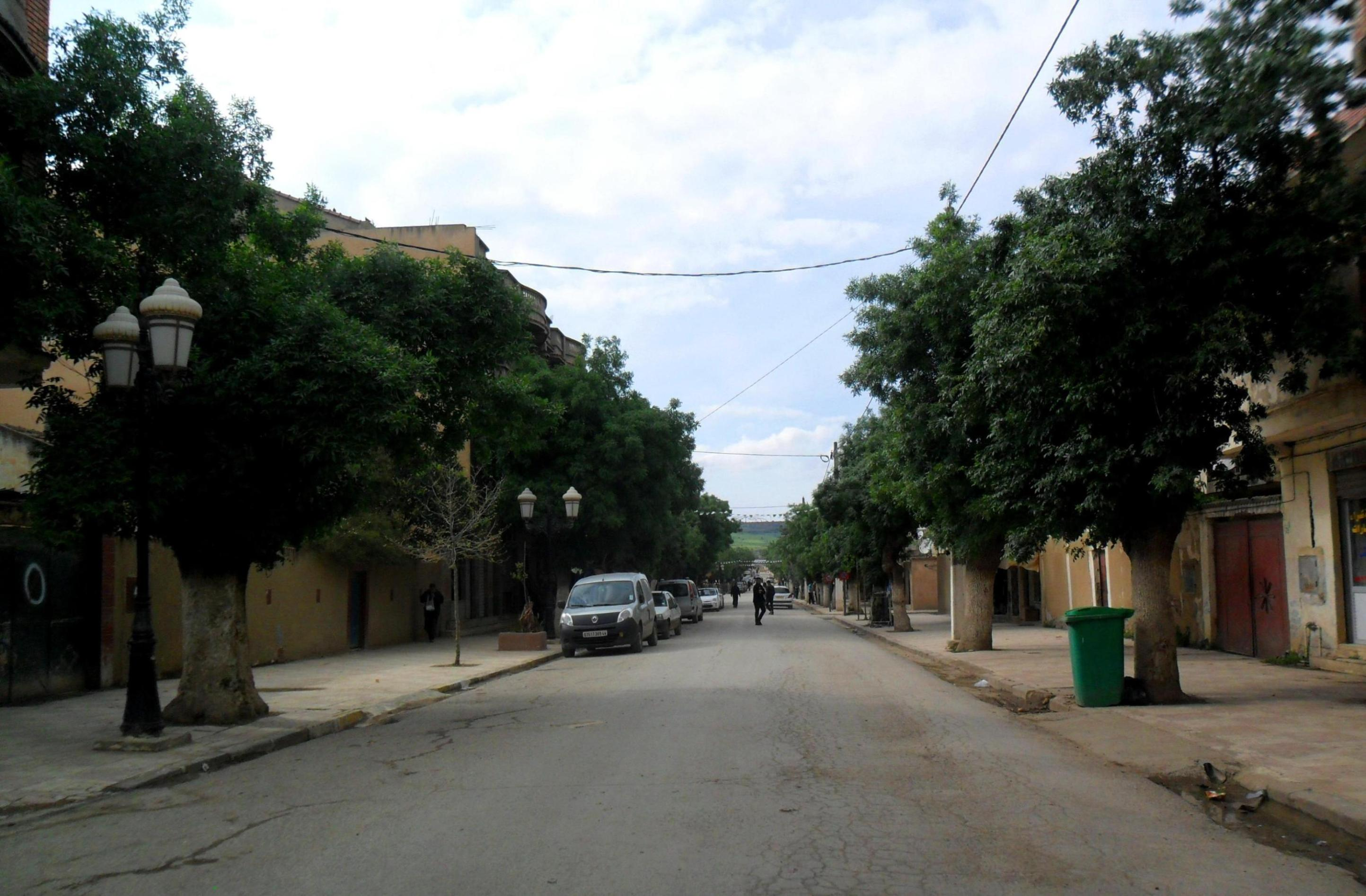
Boumedfaa Street scene

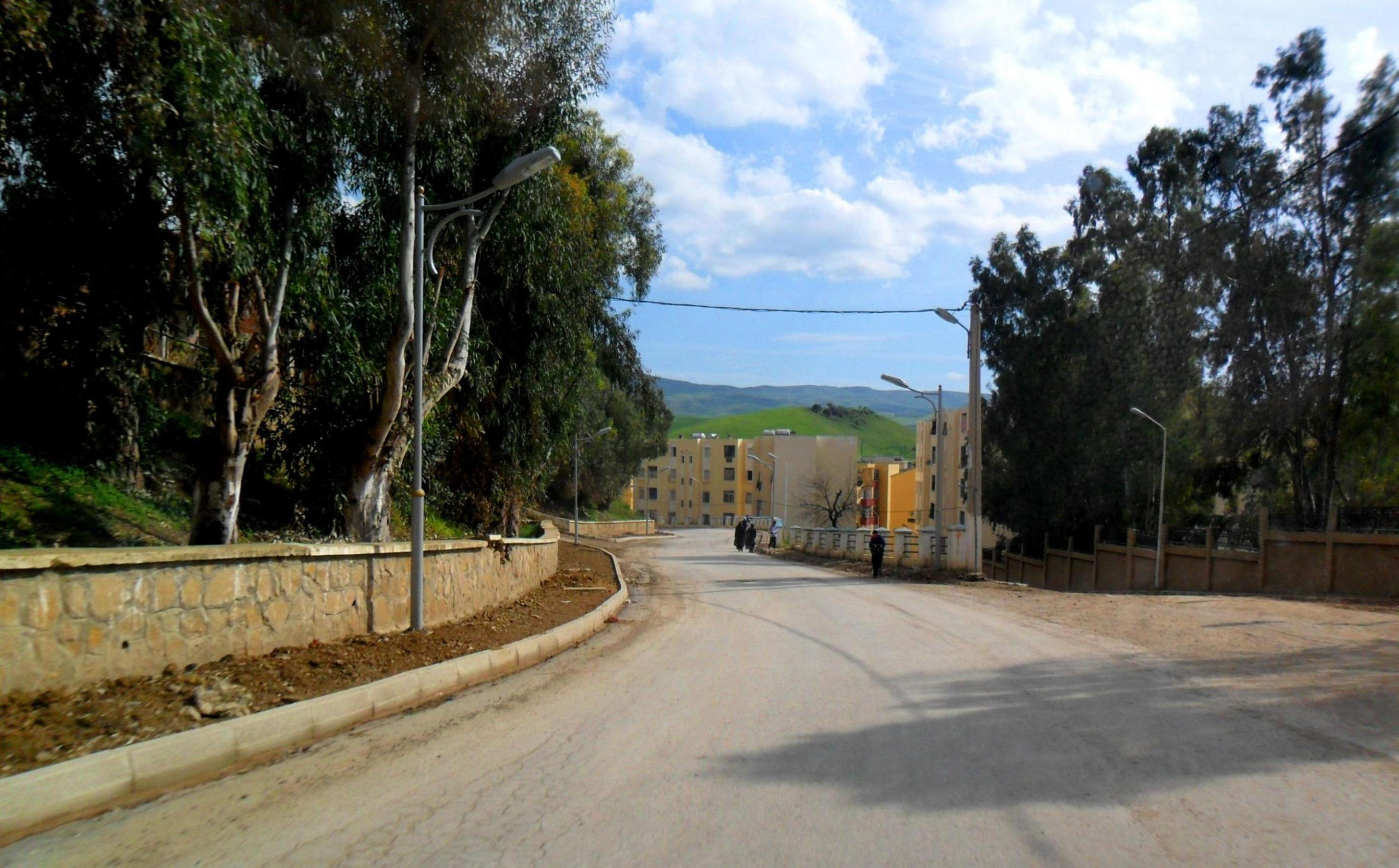
Boumedfaa street scene

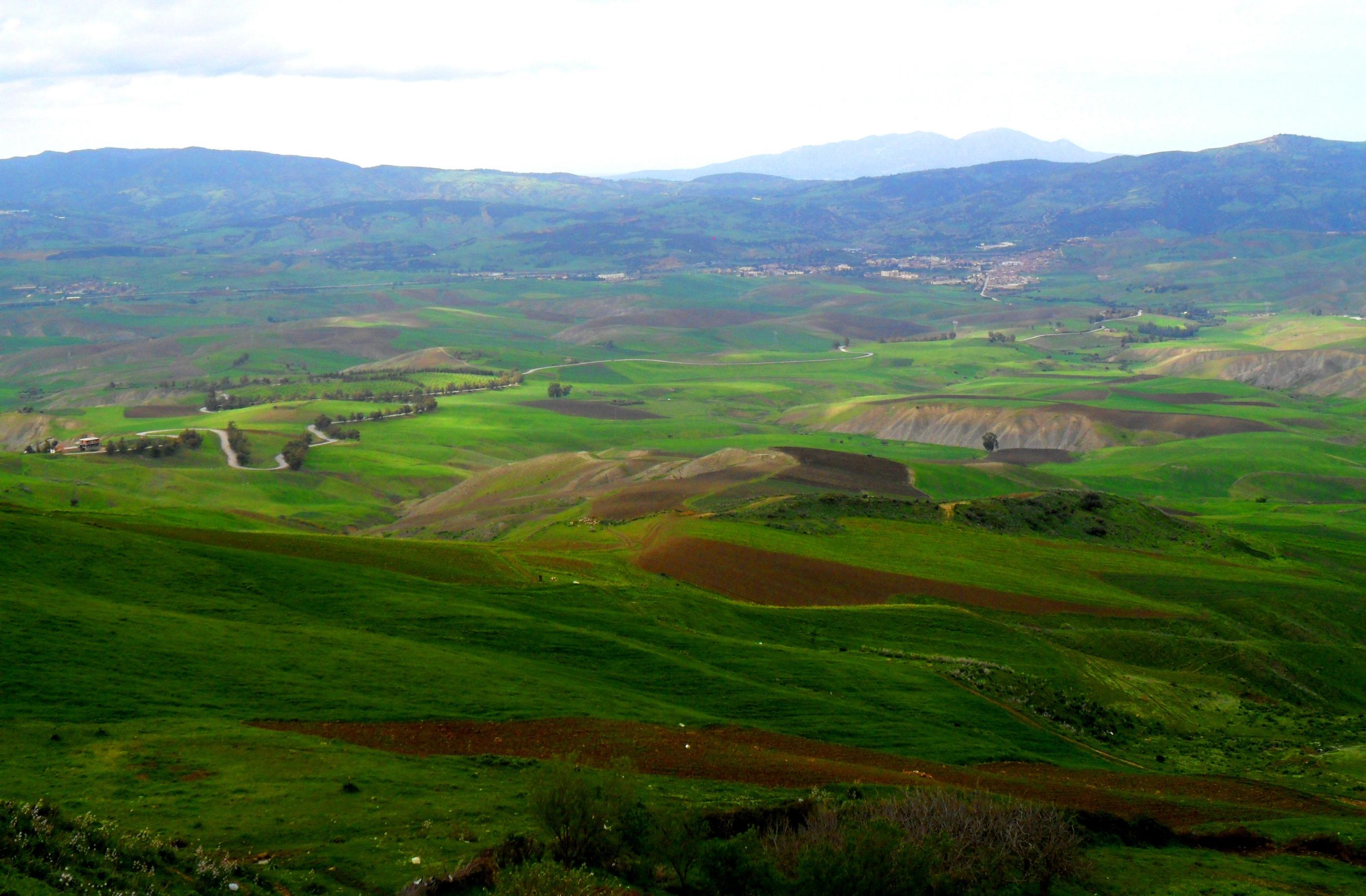
Boumedfaa panoramio
