= Adel Zaky =

Egyptian Roman Catholic prelate (1947–2019)

The Most Reverend Adel Zaky O.F.M.
- Apostolic Vicar of Alexandria
- Church: Roman Catholic Church
- See: Alexandria
- Appointed: 1 September 2009
- Quashed: 21 July 2019
- Predecessor: Giuseppe Bausardo
- Other post: Titular Bishop of Flumenzer (2009-2019)

Orders
- Ordination: 24 September 1972 by Jean de Capistran Aimé Cayer
- Consecration: 31 October 2009 by Michael Louis Fitzgerald

Personal details
- Born: Adel Zaky; 1 December 1947 Luxor, Egypt
- Died: 21 July 2019 (aged 71) Egypt
- Education: Assiut University; Saint Joseph University

Adel Zaky, O.F.M. (1 December 1947 – 21 July 2019) was an Egyptian Roman Catholic prelate who served as the Apostolic Vicar of Alexandria since 2009 until 2019. Prior to his episcopal appointment, he served in various parishes across cities such as Cairo and was also the order's national provincial superior for a time before returning to parish work.

== Life ==
Bishop Adel Zaky was born on 1 December 1947 in Luxor. Brother of Edward, Tharwat, Atef and Magdy Zaky. From 1959 until 1963 he attended the Assiut University where he obtained his bachelor's degree in theological studies.

He entered the Order of Friars Minor in the 1960s in Guizeh and began his novitiate on 30 September 1968 before making his simple profession on 1 October 1969. Zaky made his solemn religious profession on 10 September 1972. On 24 September 1972 he received his ordination to the priesthood from the Bishop Jean de Capistran Aimé Cayer. Following his ordination he continued with additional studies from 1973 to 1975 at the Jesuit-run Saint Joseph University in Beirut in Lebanon where he obtained a licentiate in dogmatic theology in 1975. From 1975 until 1989 he served in the parishes of Assiut, El-Tawirat and then in Nag-Hammadi while from 1989 to 1998 served as the order's national provincial superior residing in Daher in Cairo. From 1998 until 2009 he served as a pastor in Boulacco in Cairo.

Pope Benedict XVI appointed Zaky on 1 September 2009 as the Apostolic Vicar of Alexandria and also made him the Titular Bishop of Flumenzer; he received his episcopal consecration on 31 October 2009 from Archbishop Michael Louis Fitzgerald, with Archbishop Marco Dino Brogi and Bishop Giovanni Innocenzo Martinelli serving as the principal co-consecrators. He attended his first "ad limina" visit to Pope Francis on 8 March 2018.

The bishop spoke Arabic but was also fluent in Italian and also knew Latin, English, and French.

On 10 February 2014 the bishop met with representatives of various Christian communities in Our Lady of Heliopolis in Cairo to pray for peace and national stability. Attendees included the Coptic Patriarch Ibrahim Isaac Sidrak as well as representatives from Christian communities such as the Melkites and Lutherans. Zaky said: "at the moment the common prayer of Egyptian Christians takes on a particular character: we are going through a time where severe episodes of violence continues in the country, but also one can see signs of hope on the horizon".

In March 2015 the Franciscan-managed Coptic Church of Kafr el-Dawar was attacked prompting Bishop Zaky to refer to the episode as a link to a series of attacks against infrastructure leading him to believe the objective of attackers was to make the country insecure and also to destabilize it.
