= Jolly Vadakken =

Indian-born bishop-elect in the Catholic Church (1961)

Father Jolly Vadakken
- Apostolic Visitor for the Syro-Malabar faithful in the Arabian Peninsula
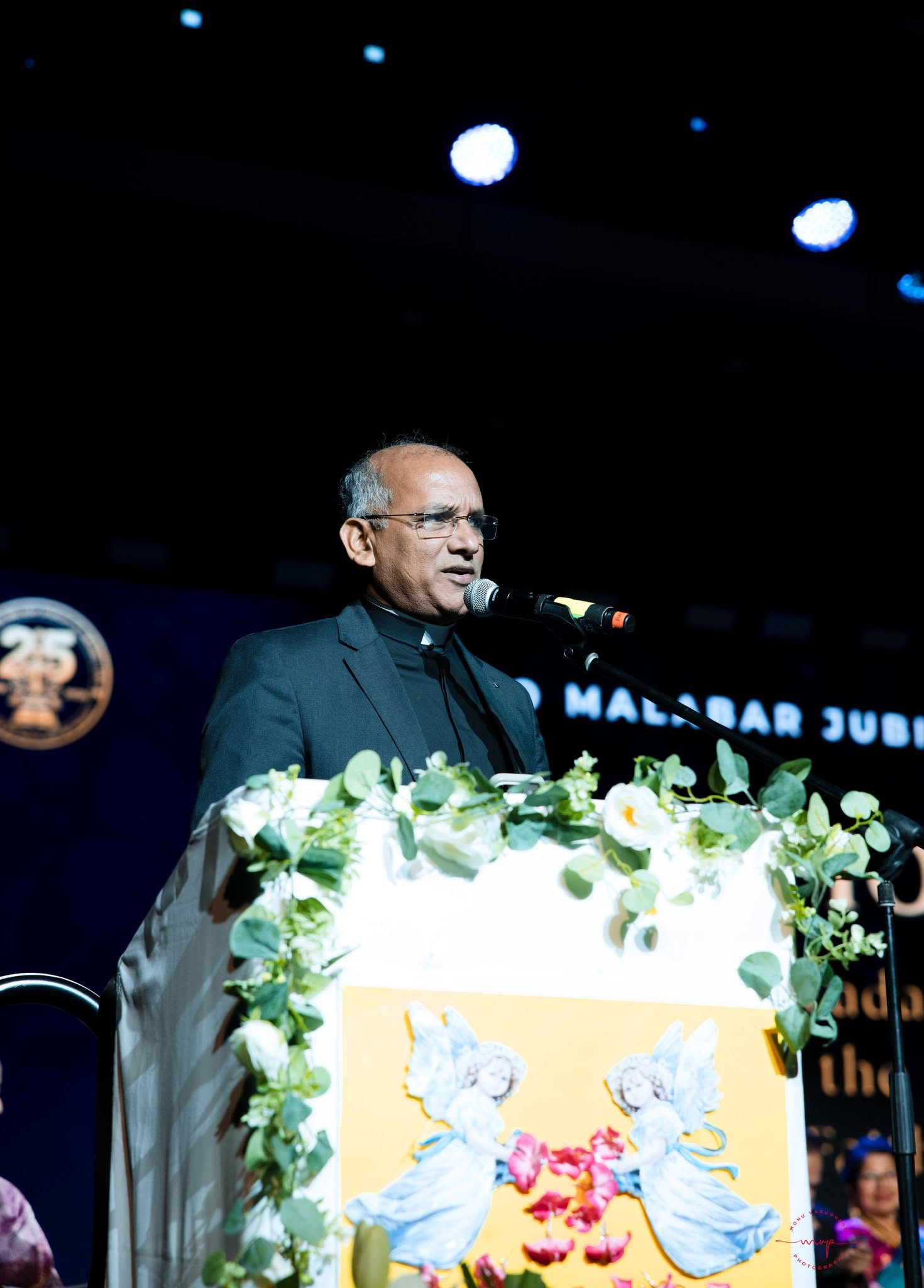
- Vadakken at the Chicago Jubilee in 2026
- Church: Syro-Malabar Catholic Church
- Appointed: 18 November 2025

Orders
- Ordination: 26 December 1989 by Mar James Pazhayattil

Personal details
- Born: Jolly Vadakken; 20 April 1965 (age 61) Mala, Kerala
- Denomination: Catholic

Fr. Jolly Vadakken (born 20 April 1961) serves as the Apostolic visitor for the Syro Malabar Church for the faithful in the Arabian Gulf.

== Biography ==
=== Early life and priesthood ===
Jolly Vadakken was born on 20 April 1961 in the village of Mala, Kerala located in the Thrissur district. He conducted his early education at Soccorso Convent L.P School and St. Antony's High School in Mala. He started his priestly formation at St. Mary's Minor Seminary in Thope and then completed his philosophical and theological studies at the St. Joseph's Pontifical Seminary in Alwaye, where he graduated in 1989.

He was ordained by James Pazhayattil on 26 December 1989, to the Syro-Malabar Catholic Eparchy of Irinjalakuda. After his ordination, he served as an assistant priest before becoming a priest in Kuzhur and Parakkadav. In 1995, Mar Pazhayattil sent Fr. Vadakken to the Salesian Pontifical University, where he received his licentiate in Media and Catechesis.

After his return to India, he continued his ministry as a parish priest before serving as the Director of the Diocesian Catechetical Department, Media Apostolate, Pastoral Center, Bible Apostolate and Justice Forum. After his stint in those roles, he served as the dean of studies at the Pastoral Orientation Centre in Palarivattom. In 2013, he was named as the Secretary for the Media Commission of the Kerala Catholic Bishop's Council until becoming the Vicar General for the Eparchy of Irinjalakuda in 2024.

=== Apostolic Visitor ===
On 18 November 2025, Pope Leo XIV appointed him as the Apostolic visitor for the Syro Malabar Church for the faithful in the Arabian Gulf.
