= Apostolic Vicariate of Alexandria of Egypt =

Roman Catholic missionary jurisdiction in Egypt

Apostolic Vicariate of Alexandria of Egypt Vicariatus Apostolicus Alexandrinus Aegypti النيابة الرسولية للإسكندرية بمصر
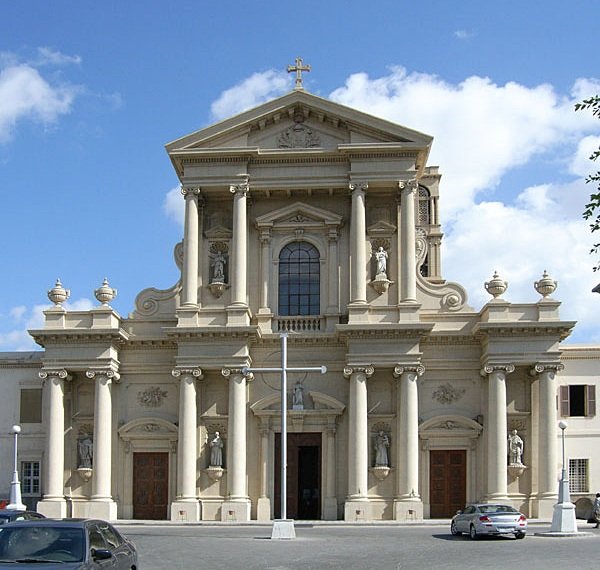
- Saint Catherine's Cathedral, Alexandria

Location
- Country: Egypt
- Metropolitan: Immediately subject to the Holy See
- Population: (as of 2024); 67,000

Information
- Sui iuris church: Latin Church
- Rite: Roman Rite
- Established: 18 May 1839; 187 years ago
- Cathedral: Saint Catherine's
- Co-cathedral: Our Lady of Heliopolis; Our Lady and Saint Michael's

Current leadership
- Pope: Leo XIV
- Apostolic Vicar: Claudio Lurati

The Apostolic Vicariate of Alexandria of Egypt, or in full - Alexandria of Egypt-Heliopolis-Port Said (Latin: Vicariatus Apostolicus Alexandrinus) is a Roman Catholic Apostolic vicariate (missionary ordinariate) in Egypt, named after its cathedral see in Alexandria, a port city and former Catholic patriarchate, which serves the Latin Catholics in Egypt.

It is exempt, i.e. directly subject to the Holy See, not part of any ecclesiastical province.

The Apostolic Vicariate of Alexandria is home to a number of religious orders and congregations, which has always been one of the essential features of the Latin catholic Church in Egypt. Today, there are 33 female institutes and 14 male ones. It oversees a network of churches, schools, hospitals, and other institutions that serves the Latin Catholics, but also people from other confessions, including Muslims.

Nowadays, the Latin Catholic Church includes a number of Egyptian nationals and a lot of people from different countries of all the continents. At least half of the community is made up of refugees and asylum seekers.

== History ==
The Catholic Church has a long history in Egypt, dating back to the early days of Christianity. In the first centuries of the Church, Alexandria was a center of theological study and home to many notable Church fathers, such as St Athanasius and St Cyril of Alexandria.

The Latin Church first establish a presence in Egypt in the 13th century, when St. Francis visited the Sultan Al-Malik Al-Kamil during the Siege of Damietta and obtained the permission to establish the first communities. Baptism, marriage and death registers in the archives of the Parish of Moski date back to 1632.

The Apostolic Vicariate of Alexandria was established on 18 May 1839 by Pope Gregory XVI, then known as the Apostolic Vicariate of Egypt and Arabia, after an announcement published in 1837. Territory was separated off from the Apostolic Vicariate of Aleppo in Syria, then covering vast territory in Africa and Arabia. Gregory warned the incoming Apostolic Vicar, Joseph Angelo di Fazio, of his concern for "abuses" in the Upper Egypt mission which Fazio was instructed to address.

Some territories were separated to establish the Apostolic Prefecture of Jedda in 1840 and again on 3 April 1846 to establish the Apostolic Vicariate of Central Africa.

Over the centuries, other Roman Catholic orders, such as Lazarists (1844), Brothers of La Salle (1847) and the Comboni Missionaries (1867), also established missions in Egypt, building churches, schools, and other institutions to serve the local community needs.

The vicariate was renamed as Apostolic Vicariate of Egypt in 1851.

The Apostolic Prefecture of the Nile Delta was created on 25 January 1886 to serve the communities in the Delta.

The Apostolic Vicariate of Canal of Suez on 12 July 1926.

On 27 January 1951 the Vicariate was renamed Apostolic Vicariate of Alexandria of Egypt.

In 1987, the three vicariates in Egypt were reunited to form the current Vicariate of Alexandria. Today the Vicariate serves the entirety of Egypt and remains committed to promoting Catholic faith, education and charitable works.

Pope John Paul II visited in February 2000, Pope Francis in April 2017.

=== United titles ===
Its full title reflects the (re)absorption of two former Latin Church missionary circonscriptions in Egypt :

- the northern Apostolic Vicariate of Heliopolis in Egypt (Eliopoli di Egitto) (since November 30, 1987), which had a see in the Cairo suburb it is named after
- the southern Apostolic Vicariate of Port-Said (since November 30, 1987), which had a see in the port city on the Suez Canal

== Missions of the Vicariate ==
In addition to its traditional religious missions, the Vicariate is responsible for the following:

=== Relief ===
The Vicariate is committed to support the most vulnerable members of its society. Its relief projects provide essential aid and support to those in need, especially refugees and migrants.

The Vicariate, through its parishes and other organizations, provides the following assistance to refugees:

==== Food ====
it is the first need to be met. Many families find themselves without a subsistence income without work and having left everything behind. Meeting their food needs becomes a daily challenge.

==== Accommodation ====
The refugees’ families are large, often 8, 9 or 10 people. Apartments are always too small but essentially crucial for families. Due to inflation and the war, rents have risen in recent months, making the situation even more complicated for new arrivals.

==== Transportation ====
The refugees families often live in remote outlying areas, far from administrative infrastructures and potential workplaces. They, therefore, need financial support to enable them to be more mobile, available and integrated into Egyptian society.

==== Healthcare ====
Many of the displaced are sick or elderly. They need appropriate care and medicines, often impossible for lack of money. The churches have agreements with certain hospitals and pay – in exchange for bills – for certain consultations and medicines.

==== Schooling ====
The churches have 3 community schools: 2 Sudanese and 1 Eritrean. These schools provide learning and discovery for children of all faiths. They enable them to follow a quality program throughout the year and to sit exams recognised by the Egyptian government.

==== Pastoral Activities ====
The churches are meeting places and places of joy. Catechism classes are held throughout the year. Outdoor activities, to the zoo or the pyramids, are also organised for children and young people. The churches offer various activities: pastoral and church-related activities, women's groups, entertainment programs for the children, workshops and open days.

The Vicariate works with local organizations and community to identify and address long-term development needs and work to empower communities to become self-sufficient and build a better future for themselves and their families.

=== Education ===
Education is an essential part of the mission of the Vicariate, which considers that every child has the right to quality education, regardless of background.

The Vicariate itself is responsible for 4 schools :

- St Joseph – Zagazig,
- Franciscan school of Mansura,
- St Augustin – Mahalla al Kobra,
- St Joseph – Port Fouad.

The Vicariate aim to provide quality education to those who may not have access to it otherwise, whether to financial, social or other reasons and to provide opportunities for children to learn, grow and thrive. The Vicariate also networks with the Catholic School Secretariat, local schools and other educational institutions to provide support programs to children and young people in need. In Egypt there are over 150 schools run by the Catholic Church.

== Significant churches ==
- the cathedral episcopal see in Alexandria, Saint Catherine.
- the co-cathedral and former cathedral Notre-Dame of Heliopolis, in Egypt's metropolitan national capital Cairo's suburb Heliopolis, formerly seat of a separate apostolic vicariate Heliopolis in northern Egypt
- the co-cathedral and former cathedral Our Lady, in Port Said, formerly seat of a separate apostolic vicariate in southern Egypt
- Basilica of St Therese of the Child Jesus, Cairo, a minor basilica,
- St. Joseph – Downtown: centre of cultural activities, and one of the largest churches,
- St. Mark – Shobra: which was until 1913 the see and cathedral of the Vicariate of Helipolis.

== Current bishop : Mgr Claudio Lurati ==
Bishop Claudio Lurati is the current bishop of the Apostolic Vicariate of Alexandria. He was born in Como, Italy, in 1962. After completing his seminary studies, he was ordained as a priest in 1989 and joined the Comboni Missionaries (MCCJ).

He served in various pastoral and administrative roles in Italy and Africa before being appointed by Pope Francis in 2020 as the Bishop of the Apostolic Vicariate of Alexandria, succeeding Bishop Adel Zaky.

Since becoming bishop, Mgr Lurati has focused on continuing the mission of the Vicariate to serve the Latin Catholic community in Egypt. He has emphasized the importance of interfaith dialogue and has worked to build strong relationships with leaders of other religious communities in the country. He has also strongly encouraged pastoral care, working closely with priests and other leaders to provide spiritual guidance and support to the faithful.

Bishop Lurati is also deeply committed to helping migrants in Egypt, recognizing their challenges in adapting to a new country and culture. He has implemented various initiatives to provide them with practical support. He also promotes the integration of migrants into the local community, encouraging parishes to welcome and embrace them.

Through his leadership, Bishop Lurati has helped to build a solid and vibrant Latin Catholic community in Egypt. He continues to work to promote the mission of the Vicariate and to support the spiritual and material needs of the community.

== Episcopal incumbents ==
All vicars were Latin Church titular bishops and members of religious orders

Apostolic Vicars of Egypt

Until 1921, the Apostolic Vicar was also the Holy See's Apostolic Delegate to Egypt and Arabia.

- Bishop Perpetuo Guasco da Solero, O.F.M. Obs. (1839.06.07 – 1859.08.02)
- Bishop Paškal Vuičić, O.F.M. Obs. (1860.09.28 – 1866.08.06)
- Archbishop Ljudevit Ćurčija, (O.F.M.) (1866.07.27 – 1881.05.01)
- Archbishop Anacleto Chicaro, O.F.M. (1881.05.12 – 1888.10.05)
- Archbishop Aurelio Briante, O.F.M. (1904.07.23 – 1921.02)
- Bishop Félix Couturier, O.P. (1919.07.03 – 1921.06.28), who became Bishop of Alexandria in Ontario (Canada) (1921.06.28 – 1941.07.27)
- Bishop Igino Nuti, O.F.M. (1921.12.20 – 1945, followed by a four-year vacancy)

Apostolic Vicars of Alexandria of Egypt

- Jean de Capistran Aimé Cayer, O.F.M. (26 May 1949 – 13 April 1978)
- Egidio Sampieri, O.F.M. (29 April 1978 – 26 August 2000)
- Giuseppe Bausardo, S.D.B. (24 February 2001 – 29 October 2008)
- Apostolic Administrator Gennaro De Martino (29 October 2008 – 1 September 2009)
- Adel Zaky, O.F.M. (1 September 2009 – 21 July 2019)
- Apostolic Administrator Elia Eskandr Abd Elmalak, O.F.M. (29 September 2019 - 6 August 2020)
- Bishop Claudio Lurati, M.C.C.J. (6 August 2020 -)

== See also ==
- List of Catholic dioceses in Egypt
- Catholic Church in Egypt
