= List of cathedrals in Egypt =

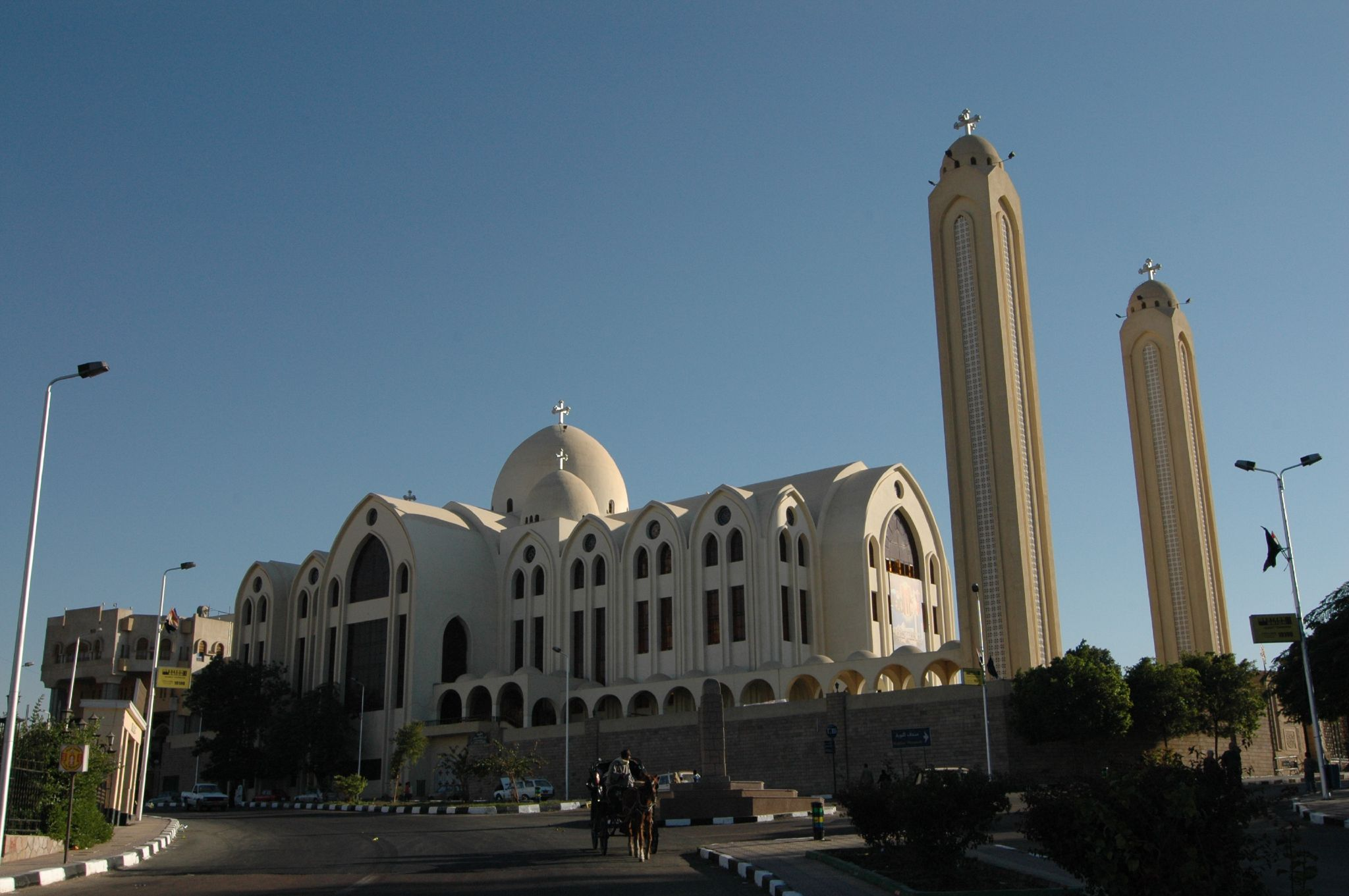
Saint Michael's Coptic Orthodox Cathedral in Aswan.

This is the list of cathedrals in Egypt sorted by denomination.

== Coptic Orthodox ==
- Saint Mark's Coptic Orthodox Cathedral in Alexandria
- Saint Mark's Coptic Orthodox Cathedral in Cairo
- Saint Mark's Coptic Orthodox Cathedral in Azbakeya
- Saint Michael's Coptic Orthodox Cathedral in Aswan
- Cathedral of the Nativity in Cairo
- Holy Family Cathedral in Shubra El-Kheima
- Cathedral of the Holy Archangel Michael, Mohandessin
- Cathedral of St. Paul, Tanta
- St. George Cathedral and the Holy Martyrs of Tanta
- Cathedral of the Virgin Mary and Archangel Michael, Mansoura
- Cathedral of the Virgin Mary and St. mina, Sinbilawein
- Cathedral of the Virgin Mary in El-Mahalla El-Kubra

== Eastern Orthodox ==
- Cathedral of Annunciation in Alexandria (Orthodox Church of Alexandria)
- Saint Catherine's Monastery on Mount Sinai (Orthodox Church of Mount Sinai)

== Catholic ==
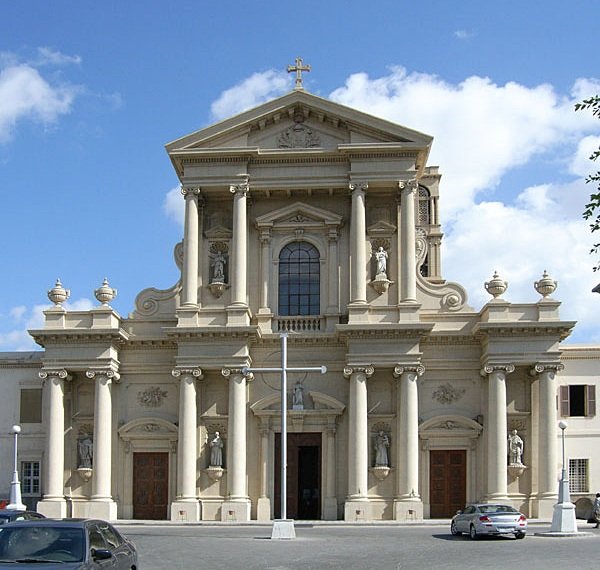
Saint Catherine's Latin Catholic Cathedral in Alexandria.

- Coptic Catholic:
  - Cathedral of the Resurrection in Alexandria
  - Saint George Cathedral in Giza
  - St. Mark's Cathedral in Ismailia
  - St. George Cathedral in Luxor
  - Cathedral of Christ the King in Minya
  - Cathedral of Our Lady of Egypt in Cairo
  - Mother of the Divine Love Cathedral in Asyut
- Latin Catholic:
  - Cathedral of Saint Catherine in Alexandria
  - Our Lady of Heliopolis Co-Cathedral in Cairo
  - Co-Cathedral of Our Lady of St. Michael in Port Said
- Melkite Greek Catholic:
  - Cathedral of the Dormition in Alexandria
  - Cathedral of the Resurrection in Cairo
- Chaldean Catholic:
  - Our Lady of Fatima Cathedral in Cairo
- Armenian Catholic:
  - Cathedral of the Annunciation in Cairo
- Syriac Catholic:
  - Cathedral of Our Lady of the Rosary in Cairo
- Maronite Catholic:
  - Saint Joseph Cathedral in Cairo

== Anglican/Episcopal ==
- All Saints' Cathedral in Cairo

== See also ==
- List of cathedrals
- Christianity in Egypt
