= Sarafian =

Sarafian or Sarafyan (Armenian: Սարաֆեան) is an Armenian surname. It is patronymic from Arabic saraf, ‘money changer’, ‘banker’. Notable people with the surname include:

- Ara Sarafian, British historian
- Asatour Sarafian, known as Oscar H. Banker (1895–1979), Ottoman Empire-born Armenian-American inventor
- Barbara Sarafian (born 1968), Belgian actress
- Bruce Sarafian (born 1966), American juggler
- Daniel Sarafian (born 1982), Brazilian-Armenian martial artist
- Deran Sarafian (born 1961), American actor, film and television director
- Katherine Sarafian (born 1970), American film producer at Pixar Animation Studios
- Nigoghos Sarafian (1905–1973), Armenian writer
- Richard C. Sarafian (1930–2013), American actor, film and television director
- Sue Sarafian Jehl (1917–1997), American military personnel, one of the three personal secretaries to General Dwight Eisenhower during World War II
- Tedi Sarafian, American screenwriter
- Angela Sarafyan, Armenian-American actress
