= Pietro Dib =

Maronite Catholic bishop (1881–1965)

- Eparch of Cairo
- Native name: بيترو ديب
- Church: Maronite Church
- Diocese: Eparchy of Cairo
- In office: 30 July 1946 – 4 November 1965
- Predecessor: Eparchy erected
- Successor: Joseph Merhi
- Previous post: Titular Eparch of Tarsus (1946)

Orders
- Ordination: 16 March 1907
- Consecration: 5 July 1946 by Achille Liénart

Personal details
- Born: 13 June 1881 Dlebta, Mount Lebanon Mutasarrifate, Ottoman Empire
- Died: 4 November 1965 (aged 84)

Pietro Dib (13 June 1881 in Dlebta – 4 November 1965) was a Maronite bishop of the Maronite Catholic Eparchy of Cairo.

== Life ==
Pietro Dib received his ordination to the priesthood on 16 March 1907.

In 1946 he was appointed by Pope Pius XII as Titular Bishop of Tarsus of Maronites and Bishop of the Eparchy of Cairo for the Maronites. His episcopal ordination was on 5 July 1946 and Dib was ordained bishop by Roman Catholic Archbishop of Lille, France, Achille Liénart; his co-consecrators were Jean-Julien Weber, Society of Saint-Sulpice, Bishop of Strasbourg, and Auguste Joseph Gaudel, Bishop of Fréjus. On 30 July of the same year Dib was appointed bishop to the Maronite Catholic Eparchy of Cairo.

Bishop Dib died on 4 November 1965.
