= Chaldean Catholic Eparchy of Cairo =

Eastern Catholic eparchy in Egypt

Eparchy of Cairo Eparchia Cahirensis Chaldaeorum
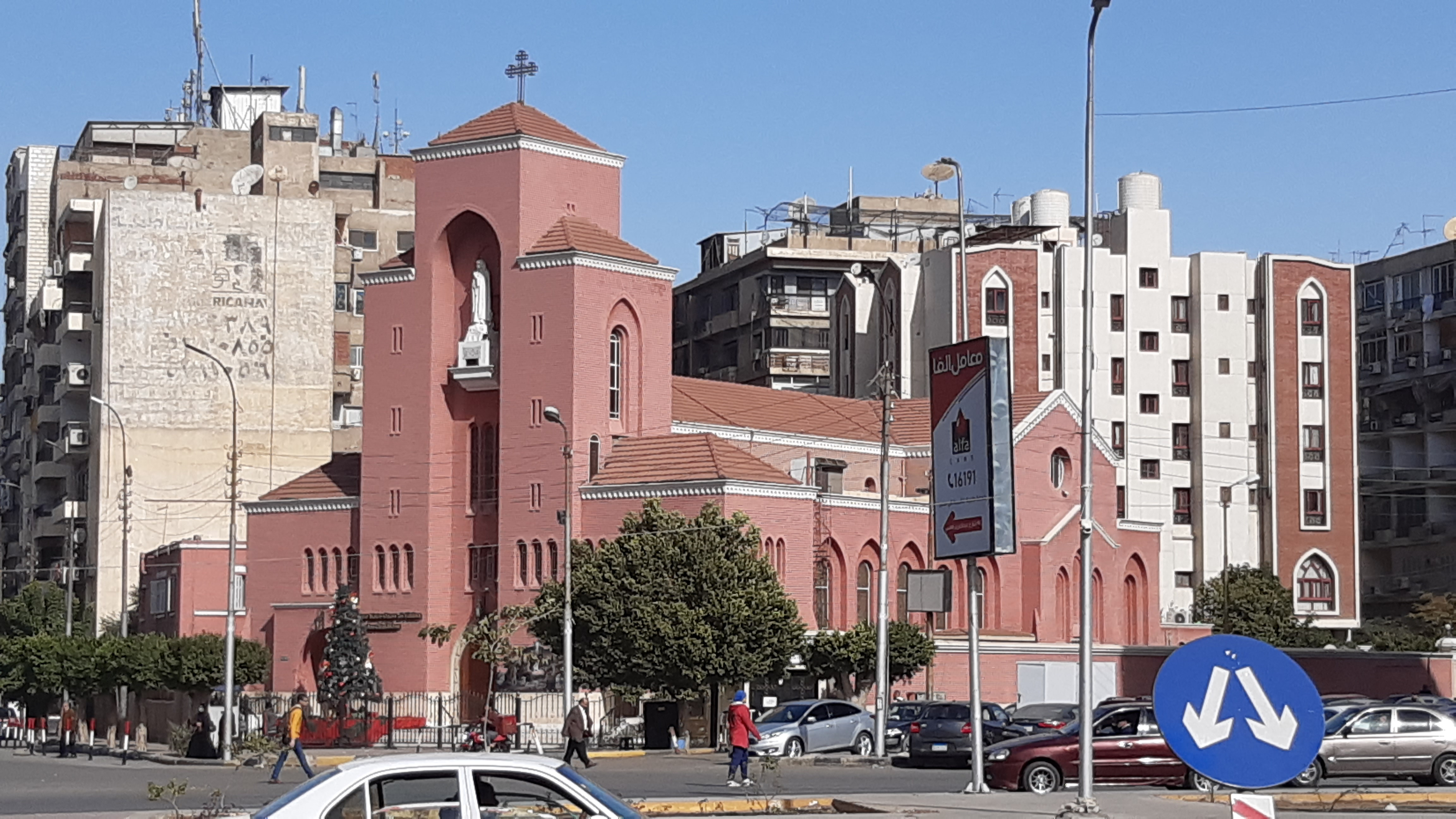

Location
- Country: Egypt
- Metropolitan: Immediately Subject to the Patriarch
- Population: (as of 2013); 3000

Information
- Rite: Chaldean Rite
- Cathedral: Cathedral of Our Lady of Fatima, Cairo

Current leadership
- Bishop: vacant see

The Chaldean Catholic Eparchy of Cairo (French: Le Caire, Latin: Eparchia Cahirensis Chaldaeorum) is an eparchy of the Chaldean Catholic Church located in Cairo in Egypt.

== History ==
- April 23, 1980: Established as Diocese of Cairo

== Special churches ==
- Minor Basilicas:
  - Cathedral of Our Lady of Fatima, Cairo

== Leadership ==
- Bishops of Cairo (Chaldean rite)
  - Bishop Ephrem Bédé, April 23, 1980 - January 18, 1984
  - Bishop Youssef Ibrahim Sarraf, February 6, 1984 - December 31, 2009
  - Patriarchal Administrator of Cairo, Fr. Paulus Sati, August,29, 2018 - present

== See also ==
- List of Roman Catholic dioceses in Egypt
- List of cathedrals in Egypt
