= Eparchy of Giza =

Coptic Catholic eparchy in Egypt

Eparchy of Giza Eparchia Gizensis

Location
- Metropolitan: Patriarchate of Alexandria

Statistics
- Population: 6,295 (2023)
- Parishes: 12 (2023)

Information
- Sui iuris church: Coptic Catholic Church
- Rite: Alexandrian Rite
- Established: 21 March 2003
- Cathedral: Cathedral of Saint George, Giza

Current leadership
- Eparch: Toma Adly Zaki
- Bishops emeritus: Antonios Aziz Mina

Map
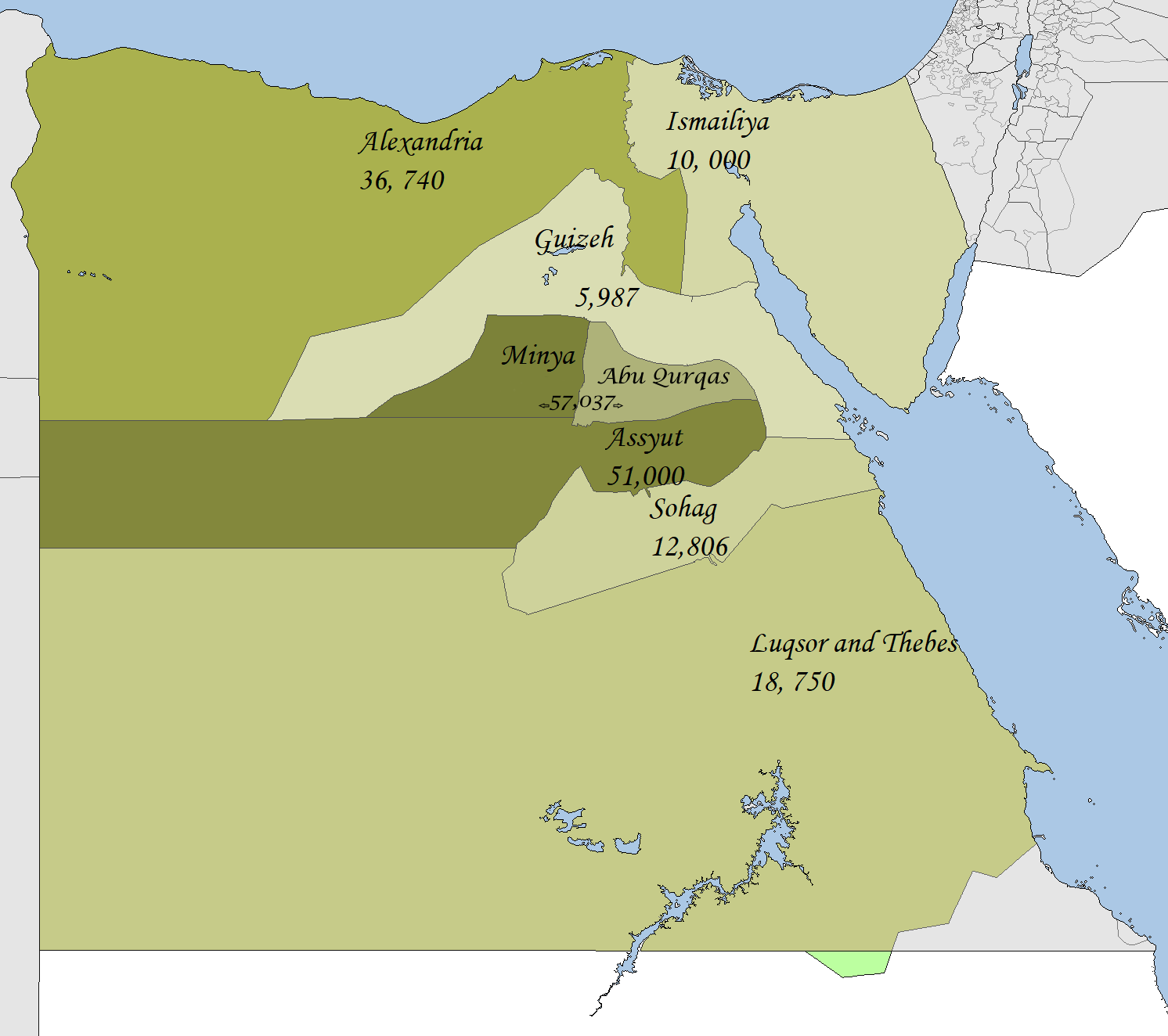

The Coptic Catholic Eparchy of Giza or Guizeh is an Eastern Catholic diocese in Giza. It is one of the suffragan sees comprising the sole ecclesiastical province (covering all Egypt) of the Coptic Catholic Patriarch of Alexandria, the head of the Coptic Catholic Church, a Particular church sui iuris (Alexandrian Rite).

Its episcopal see is Saint George cathedral in Giza, which is part of the national capital Cairo's metropolitan area.

== Statistics ==
As per 2014, it pastorally served 5,940 Coptic Catholics in 9 parishes with 13 priests (12 diocesan, 1 religious), 70 lay religious (22 brothers, 48 sisters) and 4 seminarians.

== History ==
Established on 21 March 2003 as Eparchy (Eastern Catholic Diocese) of Giza(–Fayoum–Beni Souef) / Gizen(sis) (Latin adjective), on territory split off from the Coptic Catholic Patriarchate of Alexandria's proper diocese, as its suffragan.

== Episcopal ordinaries ==
(all Coptic Alexandrian Rite)

Suffragan Eparchs (Bishops) of Giza (Guizeh)

- Andraos Salama (21 March 2003 – 6 December 2005)
- Antonios Aziz Mina (3 January 2006 – 23 January 2017)
  - Ibrahim Isaac Sidrak (23 January 2017 – 10 April 2018), Apostolic Administrator
  - Toma Adly Zaki (10 April 2018 – 25 March 2019), Apostolic Administrator
- Toma Adly Zaki (since 25 March 2019)

== See also ==
- List of Catholic dioceses in Egypt

== Sources and external links ==
- GCatholic Giza eparchy - data for all sections
