= Georges Chihane =

Bishop of the Maronite Catholic Eparchy of Cairo

- Eparch of Cairo
- Native name: جورج شيحان
- Church: Maronite Church
- Diocese: Eparchy of Cairo
- Installed: 16 June 2012
- Predecessor: François Eid

Orders
- Ordination: 12 August 1979
- Consecration: 28 July 2012 by Bechara Boutros al-Rahi

Personal details
- Born: 31 May 1953 (age 73) Haret Sakher (northeast of Sahel Alma), Mount Lebanon Governorate, Lebanon

Georges Chihane (born 31 May 1953 in Haret Sakhr, Lebanon) is the current bishop of the Maronite Catholic Eparchy of Cairo.

== Life ==
Georges Chihane studied at the Holy Spirit University of Kaslik and received on 12 August 1979 his priestly ordination.

Pope Benedict XVI confirmed his appointment as Bishop of Cairo on 16 June 2012. Maronite Patriarch of Antioch, Bechara Boutros al-Rahi, OMM, donated to him on 28 July of the same year the episcopal ordination; his co-consecrators were Samir Mazloum, retired Curia Bishop in Antioch, Guy-Paul Noujaim, emeritus Curia Bishop in Joubbé, Sarba and Jounieh, Paul Youssef Matar, Archbishop of Beirut, Francis Némé Baïssari, Emeritus Auxiliary Bishop in Joubbé, Sarba and Jounieh, Paul Nabil El-Sayah, Curial Bishop of Antioch, Joseph Mohsen Béchara, Archbishop Emeritus of Antelias, Simon Atallah, OAM, Bishop of Baalbek-Deir El-Ahmar, François Eid, OMM, Procurator of the Maronite Patriarch at the Holy See, Edgard Madi, Bishop of Nossa Senhora do Líbano em São Paulo, and Michel Aoun, Bishop of Byblos.

On 13 January 2014 Chihane was appointed by Pope Francis Apostolic Visitor for the Maronite faithful in the countries of North Africa outside his jurisdiction area.

== Sources ==
- Appointment as apostolic visitor in Holy See Press Office, Daily Bulletin, January 13, 2013
