= Bsaba =

- Location within Lebanon
- Coordinates: 33°36′18″N 35°33′14″E
- Country: Lebanon
- Governorate: Mount Lebanon
- Time zone: +2
  - Summer (DST): +3

Bsaba (pronounced: BSE-ba; Levantine Arabic: بسابا (قضاء بعبدا), romanized: Bsēbā), also written as Bessaba, Bisaba, Bisābā, Bseba El Chouf, is a village in Chouf District, Lebanon. Bsaba is a member of Federation of South Iqlim El Kharroub Municipalities.

== History ==
In 1838, Eli Smith noted it as Bsaba, as a village located in "Aklim el Kharnub, North of et-Tuffah, next the coast".

== Bibliography ==
- Robinson, E.; Smith, E. (1841). Biblical Researches in Palestine, Mount Sinai and Arabia Petraea: A Journal of Travels in the year 1838. Vol. 3. Boston: Crocker & Brewster.
