= Makseh =

Makseh مكسة
- Village
- Location in Lebanon
- Coordinates: 33°48′30″N 35°50′00″E
- Country: Lebanon
- Governorate: Beqaa Governorate
- District: Zahlé
- Elevation: 3,080 ft (940 m)
- Time zone: UTC+2 (EET)
  - Summer (DST): +3

Makseh (Arabic: مكسة), is a village located in the Zahlé District of the Beqaa Governorate in Lebanon.

== History ==
In 1838, Eli Smith noted Mekseh's population being Sunni Muslim and Maronite.

== Bibliography ==
- Robinson, E.; Smith, E. (1841). Biblical Researches in Palestine, Mount Sinai and Arabia Petraea: A Journal of Travels in the year 1838. Vol. 3. Boston: Crocker & Brewster.
