= Annunciation Cathedral, Cairo =

Coordinates: 30.04683°N 31.2395°E

Annunciation Cathedral
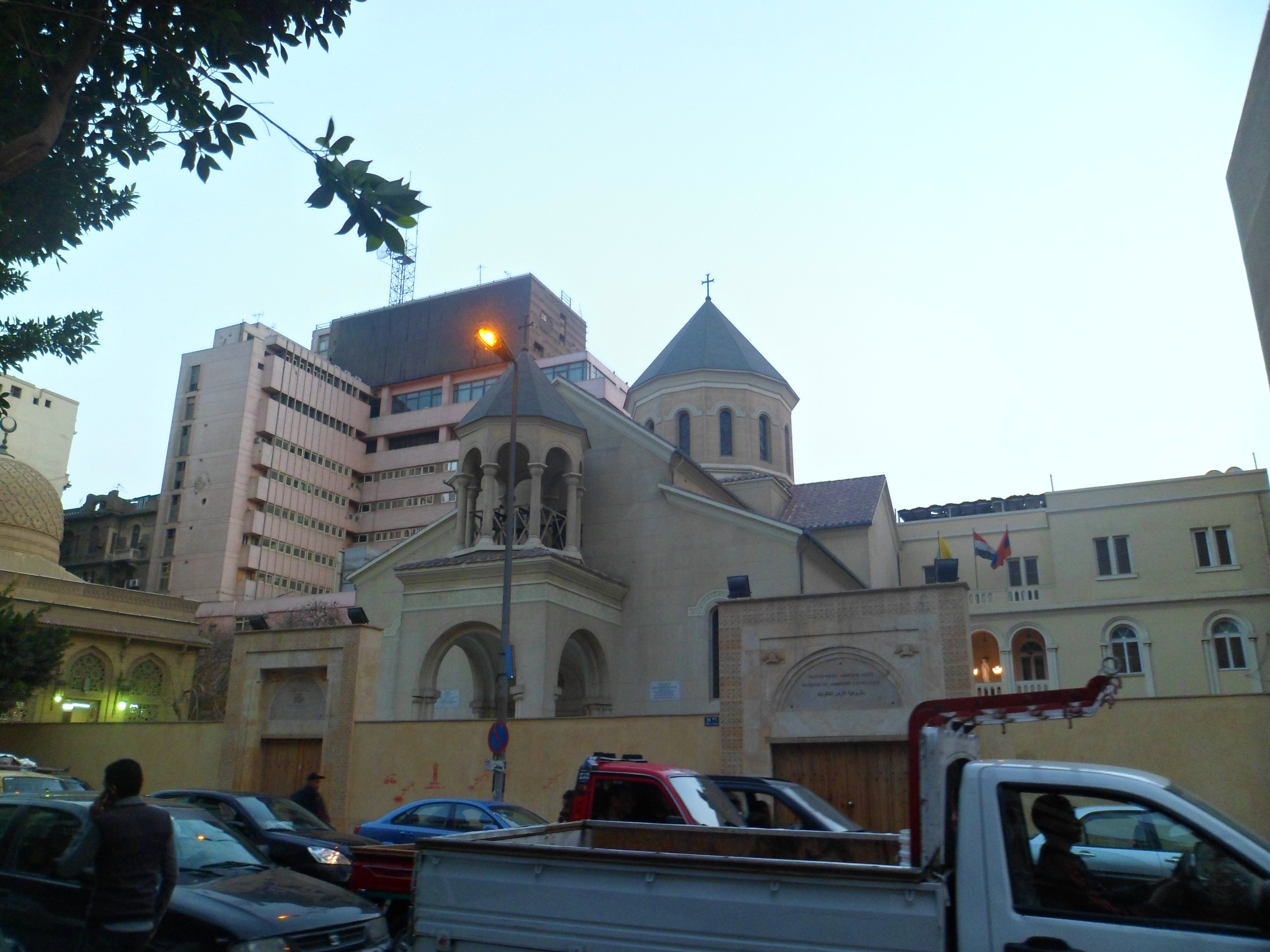
- Annunciation Cathedral
- Location: Cairo
- Country: Egypt
- Denomination: Catholic
- Tradition: Armenian Rite
- Churchmanship: Armenian Catholic Church

The Annunciation Cathedral (also called the Armenian Catholic Cathedral of Cairo) is a religious building affiliated with the Catholic Church that follows the Armenian Rite and is located on Mohamed Sabri Abu Alm Street, Abdine in Cairo, Egypt.

The temple opened in 1926 serves as the headquarters of the Armenian Diocese of Iskanderiya also known as the Armenian Catholic Eparchy of Alexandria (Eparchia Alexandrina Armenorum) which was created in 1885 by Pope Leo XIII to meet the religious needs of the region's Catholic Armenians.

The cathedral is under the pastoral responsibility of Bishop Kricor-Okosdinos Coussa.

== See also ==
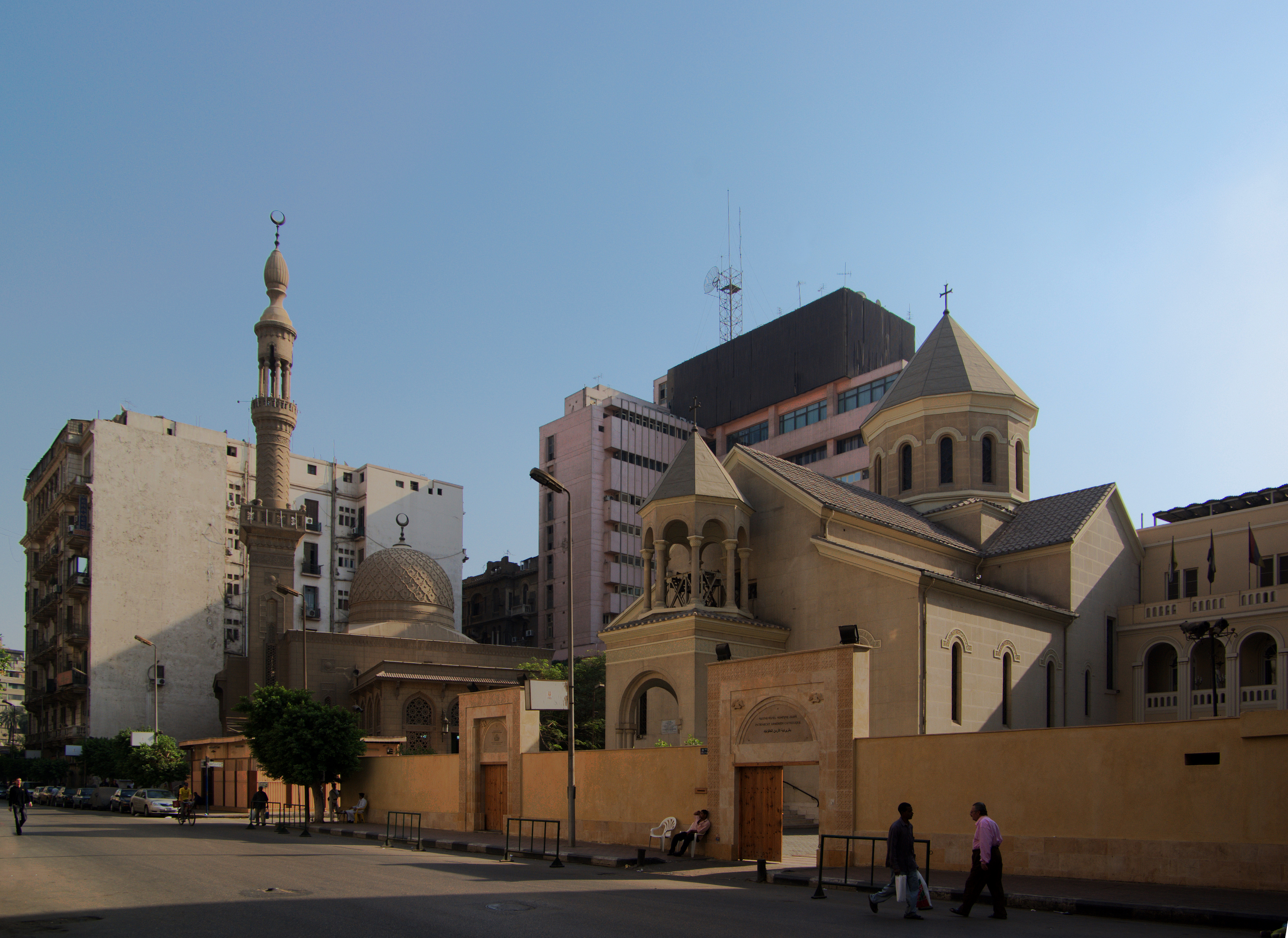
Another view

- Roman Catholicism in Egypt
