= Bruce Sarafian =

American juggler and unicyclist

Bruce Sarafian (born August 17, 1966) is an American juggler and unicyclist from Florida. He performs in venues such as theme parks, festivals, fairs and also for corporate clients. He began juggling at the age of 10. In 2007 he started and now operates a custom used classic jeep dealership in Central Florida, which has become one of the nation's largest, called EZJeeps.com In 2018 his jeep dealership was renamed EZCustom4x4.com

== Skills ==
Sarafian was the first juggler to flash 11 balls, as listed in The Guinness Book of Records 1993, and the first to flash 12 balls.

He has received the following juggling awards:

- Numbers Competition Winner (Individual Balls, Individual Ball Showering) at the International Jugglers' Association (IJA) Summer Festival in 1994.
- Numbers Competition Winner (Individual Balls, Individual Ball Shower, and Team Ball Passing) at the IJA Summer Festival in 1995.
- Numbers Competition Winner (Solo Balls, Duo Balls) at the IJA Summer Festival in 1997.
