= Antonios Aziz Mina =

Egyptian Coptic Catholic bishop (born 1955)

The Most Reverend Antonios Aziz Mina
- Bishop Emeritus of Giza
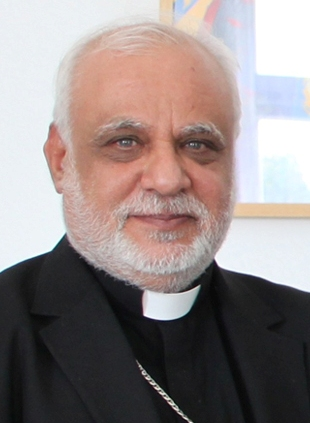
- Church: Coptic Catholic Church
- Diocese: Giza
- See: Guizeh, Egypt
- Appointed: 3 January 2006
- Installed: 22 January 2006
- Term ended: 23 January 2017
- Predecessor: Andraos Salama
- Successor: Ibrahim Isaac Sidrak (Apostolic Administrator)
- Previous posts: Curial Official of the Dicastery for the Eastern Churches (1992–2002); Auxiliary Bishop of Alexandria (2002–2006); Titular Bishop of Mareotes (2002–2006)

Orders
- Ordination: 9 June 1978 by Antonios Naguib
- Consecration: 13 February 2003 by Stephanos II Ghattas

Personal details
- Born: 9 February 1955 (age 71) Minya, Egypt
- Education: Pontifical Oriental Institute

Antonios Aziz Mina (born 9 February 1955) is an Egyptian Coptic Catholic hierarch. He served as the Bishop of the Eparchy of Giza from 2006 until his resignation in 2017. Previously, he served as a curial official in the Dicastery for the Eastern Churches and as an auxiliary bishop for the Coptic Catholic Patriarchate of Alexandria.

== Early life and ministry ==
Antonios Aziz Mina was born in Minya, Egypt, on 9 February 1955. After completing his primary and secondary education, he pursued studies in philosophy and theology. He was ordained a priest for the Eparchy of Minya on 9 June 1978. Following his ordination, he served in pastoral ministry for several years.

In 1984, he was sent to Rome to pursue higher studies, where he earned a doctorate in canon law from the Pontifical Oriental Institute. He then returned to Egypt to complete his service in the Eparchy of Minya, and was a professor of canon law in the Maadi Seminary. In 1992, he entered the service of the Holy See as an official at the Congregation for the Oriental Churches (now the Dicastery for the Eastern Churches). During his tenure in the Roman Curia, he also served as a judge on the ecclesiastical tribunal of the Vicariate of Rome and taught Eastern Canon Law at the Pontifical Oriental Institute.

== Episcopate ==
On 19 December 2002, the Synod of Bishops of the Coptic Catholic Church elected him as an auxiliary bishop for the Patriarchate of Alexandria. Pope John Paul II granted his assent to the election on 21 December 2002, assigning him the titular see of Mareotes. He was consecrated to the episcopate on 13 February 2003 by Coptic Catholic Patriarch Stephanos II Ghattas, with other Bishops of the Coptic Catholic Church serving as co-consecrators.

Following his episcopal consecration, he remained in Rome temporarily at the request of the Holy See to continue his duties at the Congregation for the Oriental Churches until Easter 2003.

On 27 December 2005, the Coptic Catholic Synod elected Mina to succeed Bishop Andraos Salama as the Bishop of the Eparchy of Giza. Pope Benedict XVI confirmed the election on 3 January 2006. He was formally installed in Guizeh on 5 February 2006.

During his tenure in Giza, Mina was an active voice regarding the situation of the Christian minority in Egypt, particularly during the sociopolitical transitions following the 2011 revolution. In 2013, during the drafting of a new Egyptian constitution, he expressed the willingness of the Christian community to accept the maintenance of the state's Islamic identity, provided that Article 3 ensured Christians could be governed by their own religious laws for personal status issues. He also participated in the Synod of Bishops for the Middle East held at the Vatican in October 2010, where he highlighted the pastoral challenges of Christian emigration from the region.

On 23 January 2017, Pope Francis accepted his resignation from the pastoral governance of the Eparchy of Giza.
