= Youssef Ibrahim Sarraf =

- Eparch of Cairo
- Native name: يوسف ابراهيم الصراف
- Church: Chaldean Catholic Church
- Diocese: Eparchy of Cairo
- In office: 6 February 1984 – 31 December 2009
- Predecessor: Ephrem Bédé
- Successor: Sede Vacante

Orders
- Ordination: 19 December 1964 by Gregorio Pietro Agagianian
- Consecration: 13 May 1984 by Paul II Cheikho

Personal details
- Born: 5 October 1940 Cairo, Kingdom of Egypt
- Died: 31 December 2009 (aged 69)

Youssef Ibrahim Sarraf (Arabic: يوسف إبراهيم صراف, Syriac: ܢܘܣܦ ܐܒܪܗܡ ܨܪܐܦ), (5 October 1940 – 31 December 2009) was the second bishop of the Chaldean Catholic Eparchy of Cairo, Egypt.

Born in Cairo, Sarraf was ordained to the priesthood on 19 December 1964. On 6 February 1984, Sarraf was appointed bishop of the Eparchy of Cairo and was ordained on 13 May 1984.
