= St. Catherine's Cathedral, Alexandria =

Coordinates: 31.1946°N 29.8946°E

St. Catherine's Cathedral
- كاتدرائية سانت كاترين
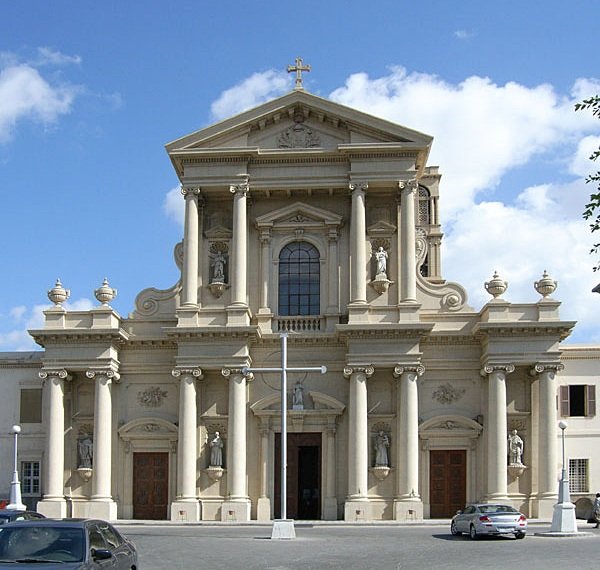
- St. Catherine's Cathedral
- Location: Alexandria
- Country: Egypt
- Denomination: Catholic

History
- Status: Cathedral
- Founded: 1856; 170 years ago
- Dedication: Catherine of Alexandria

Architecture
- Functional status: Active
- Architect: Serafino da Baceno
- Style: Neo-Baroque

St. Catherine's Cathedral (Arabic: كاتدرائية سانت كاترين) is a Catholic cathedral in Alexandria, Egypt. It is the seat of the Apostolic Vicariate of Alexandria of Egypt. It also serves as the church of the Franciscan monastery in Alexandria.

== History ==
The basilica was built from 1847 to 1856 in the Neo-Baroque style, designed by the Franciscan architect Serafino da Baceno.

The Franciscans have been present since the seventeenth century in Alexandria, where it is particularly concerned by European pilgrims who were on their way to the Holy Land. In the 1840s the new buildings of the convent and school were founded. The new church, a basilica with classical dome also conceived as the cathedral of the Apostolic Vicariate, established in 1839, and received the name of the martyr Catherine of Alexandria. The dedication took place on November 24, 1850. In 1927, the current facade, designed by the Italian architect Mario Avena (1896-1968 or 1969) in the Roman Baroque style was added.

It was the place of burial of exiled Italian king Victor Emmanuel III upon his death in 1947 until his remains were repatriated to Italy in 2017.

== See also ==
- Basilica of St Therese of the Child Jesus, Cairo
