= Ida in Mauretania =

Roman Empire - Mauretania Caesariensis (125 AD)

Ida of Mauritania was an ancient Roman town of the Roman province of Mauretania Caesariensis. An exact location for the town is not currently known, but it is presumed to have been in today's Algeria.

The city was also the seat of an ancient bishopric of Mauretania Caesariensis.

Very little is known of the history of the bishopric, though at the synod assembled in Carthage in 484 by the Arian King Huneric of the Vandal Kingdom, there were two bishops representing the town. They were Subitan and Felician, both of Mauretania Caesariensis. This suggests that there were two episcopal seats with this name, but it is unknown if this was because the city was divided into two bishoprics, there were two cities of this name or if they were rival bishops for the one seat. Today the diocese survives as a titular bishopric and the current bishop is Giuseppe Bausardo, of Alexandria, Egypt.
