= Maronite Catholic Eparchy of Cairo =

Eastern Catholic eparchy in Egypt

Eparchy of Cairo (Maronite) Eparchy Cahirensis Maronitarum

Location
- Country: Egypt
- Headquarters: Lebanon

Statistics
- Population: (as of 2013); 5,000
- Parishes: 7

Information
- Denomination: Eastern Catholic Churches
- Rite: West Syro-Antiochene Rite
- Established: 22 June 1946 (80 years ago)
- Cathedral: Saint Joseph Cathedral
- Patron saint: Saint Joseph

Current leadership
- Pope: Leo XIV
- Patriarch: Bechara Boutros al-Rahi
- Eparch: Georges Chihane

Website
- http://www.maronite-egypt.com/

Maronite Catholic Eparchy of Cairo of the Maronites (in Latin: Eparchy Cahirensis Maronitarum) is a seat of the Maronite Church suffragan of the Patriarchate of Antioch of the Maronites. It is currently ruled by eparch Georges Chihane.

== Territory and statistics ==
The eparchy extends to all the faithful of the Maronites in Egypt, Sudan, and South Sudan. Its eparchial seat is the city of Cairo, where the cathedral of St. Joseph is located.

The eparchy at the end of 2013 had 5,000 members and is divided into seven parishes.

== History ==
The patriarchal vicariate to Maronites in Egypt was built in 1904. It was raised to the dignity of eparchy on 22 June 1946 with the Papal bull Inter praecipuas of Pope Pius XII.

== Bishops ==
- Pietro Dib (July 30, 1946 - November 4, 1965 deceased)
- Joseph Merhi, CML (August 24, 1972 - June 5, 1989 withdrawn)
- Joseph Dergham (June 5, 1989 - September 18, 2005 withdrawn)
- François Eid, OMM (September 24, 2005 - June 16, 2012 appointed patriarchal procurator to the Holy See)
- Georges Chihane, from 16 June 2012

== List of Churches ==
List of Maronite Churches in Egypt

- Saint Joseph Cathedral in Cairo
- Saint Maron Parish - Heliopolis
- George's Parish - Shubra
- Saint Therese Parish - Alexandria
- Saint Therese Church - Ismailia
- Saint Therese Church - Port Said

== See also ==
- List of Catholic dioceses in Egypt
- List of cathedrals in Egypt

== Sources ==
- Annuario Pontificio, Libreria Editrice Vaticana, Città del Vaticano, 2003, ISBN 88-209-7422-3
