= Basilica of St Therese of the Child Jesus, Cairo =

Roman Catholic minor basilica in Cairo, Egypt

Coordinates: 30°05′06″N 31°14′47″E

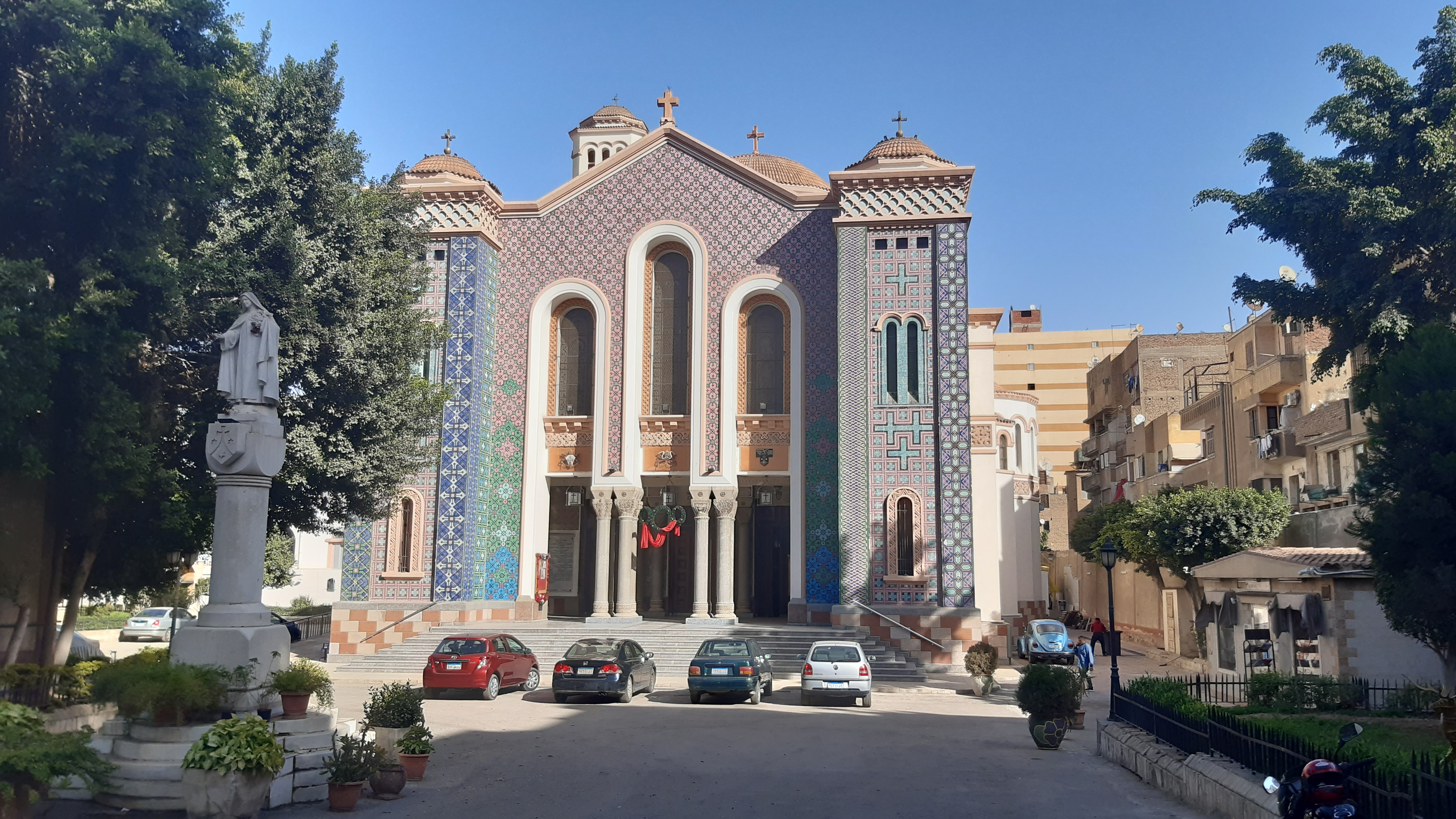

The Basilica of St Therese of the Child Jesus (Arabic: بازيليك سانت تريز الطفل يسوع) is a Roman Catholic minor basilica in Cairo, Egypt, dedicated to Thérèse of Lisieux. The foundation stone of the church was laid in 1931 and the construction was finished in 1932. The church is under the circumscription of the Apostolic Vicariate of Alexandria of Egypt. It was decreed basilica on July 8, 1972. Saint Therese is well known among both Egyptian Catholics and Copts. Hundreds of votive tablets covering the walls of the crypt testify the granted intercession of the saint. On the Line 2 metro, the metro station close to the basilica is named after Saint Theresa.

== Literature ==
- Manfred Karl Böhm: Eine beliebte Pilgeroase an den Ufern des Nils. Das Heiligtum "St. Theresia vom Kinde Jesus" in Kairo, in: Theresien-Kalender 1995 (70. Jahrgang), S.43-44.
