= Our Lady of Fatima Cathedral, Cairo =

Coordinates: 30.105912°N 31.344426°E

Cathedral of Our Lady of Fatima
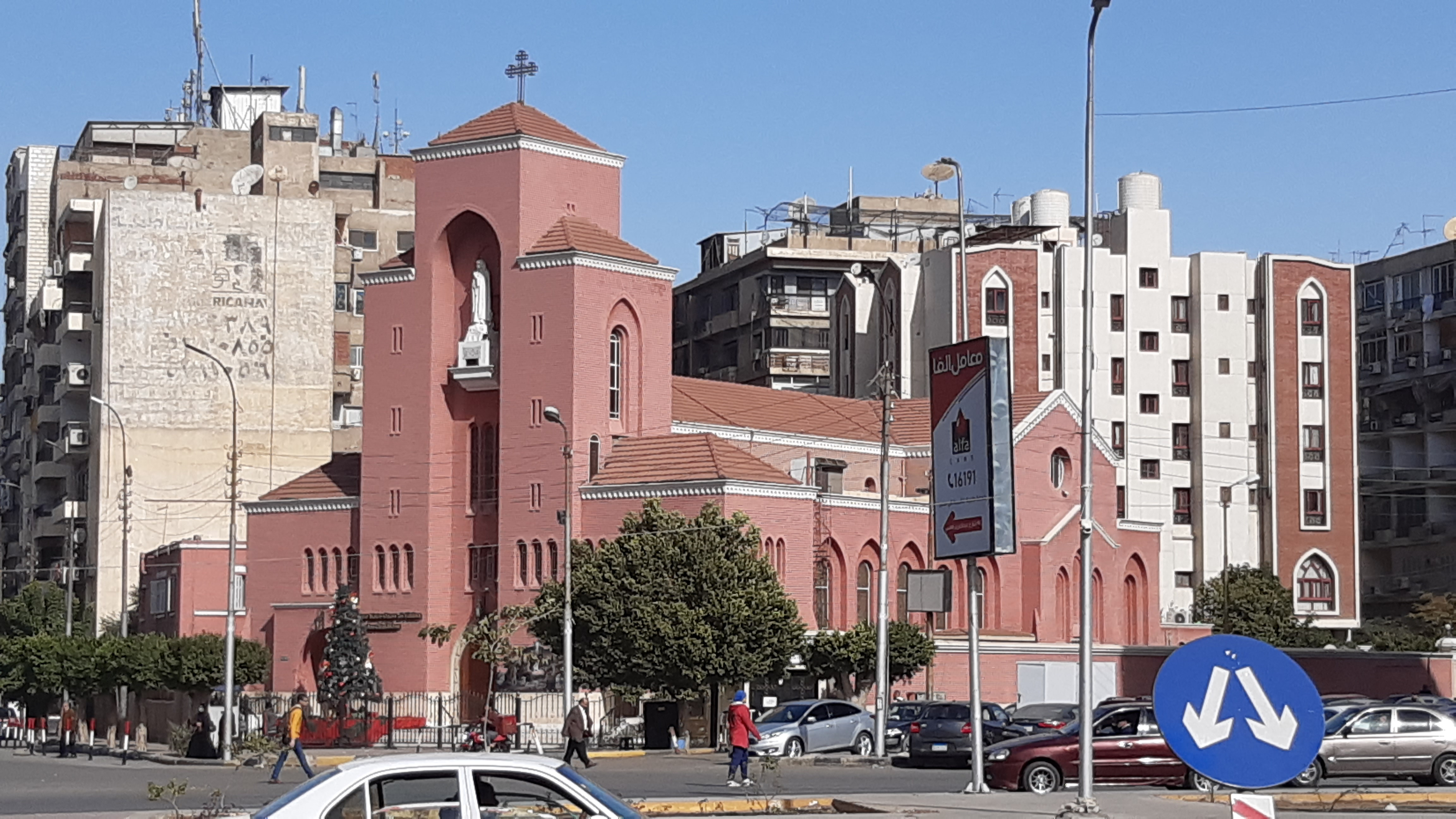
- Cathedral of Our Lady of Fatima
- Location: Cairo
- Country: Egypt
- Denomination: Catholic (Chaldean Catholic Church)
- Tradition: East Assyrian Rite

Architecture
- Architectural type: church

The Cathedral of Our Lady of Fatima or just Chaldean Catholic Cathedral in Cairo is a religious building that is affiliated with the Catholic Church and is located in the city of Cairo, the capital of the African country of Egypt.

It is a temple that follows the Chaldean Catholic or Eastern Syriac Rite in full communion with the Pope in Rome. It functions as the main church of the Diocese or Chaldean Eparchy of Cairo (Eparchia Cahirensis Chaldaeorum) which was elevated to its current status in 1980 by Pope John Paul II.

Currently seat vacant since 1993 is also a Catholic basilica by decision of the Holy See.
