= Xwarshed Yasht =

Zoroastrian religious hymn

- ← Aban Yasht Mah Yasht →
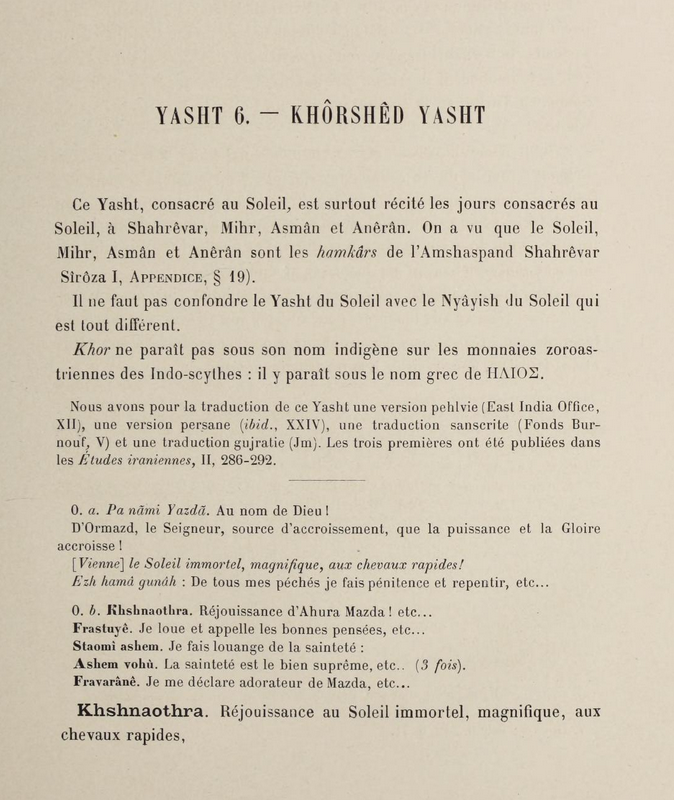
- First page of the Xwarshed Yasht in Darmesteter's French translation

Information
- Religion: Zoroastrianism
- Language: Avestan
- Period: Avestan period
- Verses: 6

The Xwarshed Yasht, also known as Khurshed Yasht or Khorshed Yasht, is the sixth hymn of the Yashts. It is dedicated to Hvare-khshaeta, the Zoroastrian divinity representing the Sun.

== Name ==
Xwarshed (Middle Persian: 𐭧𐭥𐭫(𐭧)𐭱𐭩𐭲, xwar(x)šēd) is the Middle Persian term for the Sun or sunlight. It continues Avestan: 𐬵𐬎𐬎𐬀𐬭𐬆-𐬑𐬱𐬀𐬉𐬙𐬀 (huuarə-xšaēta), the name of the Zoroastrian yazata of the Radiant Sun. It is also the origin of Modern Persian خورشید (xwaršēd), with the meaning sun or sunlight, as well as the Persian given name Khorshid. Xwarshed is a compound term consisting of xwar, the general Middle Persian word for the Sun, and shet, Middle Persian for radiant or shining.

== Within the Yasht collection ==
Within the collection of 21 Yashts, the Xwarshed Yasht is the sixth hymn. Like most other yashts in the collection, it is considered to have been part of the Bagan yasht, where it may have formed the second chapter. Like Yasht 7 (Moon), Yasht 8 (Sirius), Yasht 15 (Wind) and Yasht 21 (Vanant), it is devoted to a personified natural phenomen. With only 6 stanzas, it is one of the shorter yashts in the collection and it is counted among the so called Minor Yashts. The hymn is performed regularly on the 10th day of the Zoroastrian calendar, dedicated to the Sun, but also on the days dedicated to Kshatra vairya, Mithra, Asman and Anaghra raokau.

== Connection to the Xwarshed Niyayishn ==
The Xwarshed Yasht has a close connection to the Xwarshed Niyayishn. Like the Mah Yasht, its text is completely contained in the corresponding Niyayishn. The seven stanzas of the Xwarshed Yasht, plus its introductory formula, form stanzas 10-17 of the Xwarshed Niyayishn. There is no scholary consensus on the dependency between these two texts. Panaino has, however, provided a number of rationales, which support the conclusion that the Niyayishns are derived from the respective yashts.

== Editions and translations ==
None of the manuscripts containing the Xwarshed Yasht do provide a translation of the text. However, the manuscripts of the Xwarshed Nyayishn, which contains the full text of the Xwarshed Yasht, do come with translations into Middle Persian, Sanskrit, Gujarati and Modern Persian. The oldest translation is into Middle Persian, which may have been created already during the Sasanian Empire, while the others were created at a later time.

In 1908, Dhalla provided a translation of the Avestan, Middle Persian, Sankskit and Gujarati version of Xwarshed Nyaishn into English. Most modern translations are, however, based on the edition of the Xwarshed Yasht by Geldner. Darmesteter provided an English translation of the yasht in 1883 and a French translation in 1892. In 1927, Lommel provided a translation into German as part of his translation of the Yasht collection. A critical edition of the Xwarshed Yasht and Mah Yasht including a translation into Italian was published by Panaino.
