= Niyayishn =

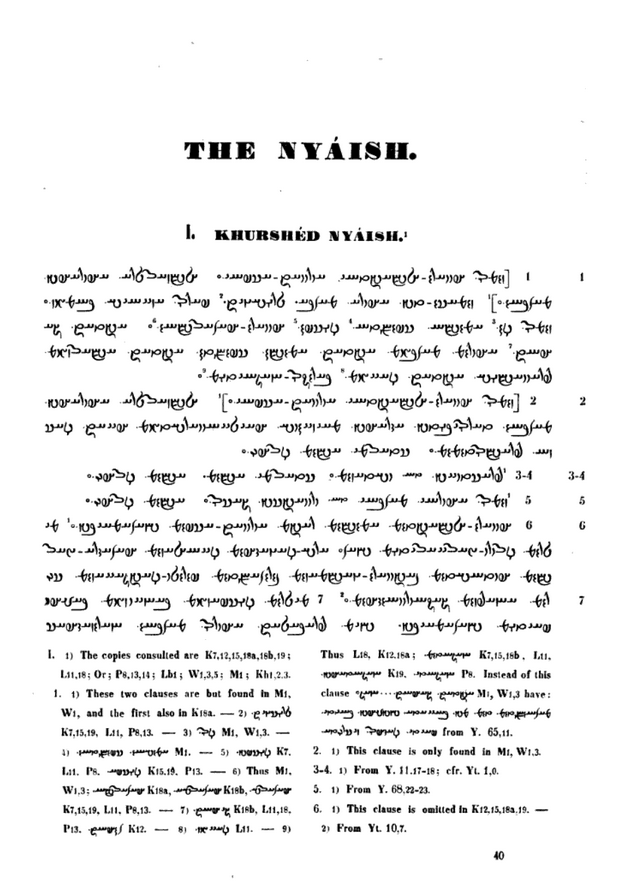
- First page of the Niyayishn collection in Westergaard's edition

Information
- Religion: Zoroastrianism
- Language: Avestan
- Chapters: 5

The Niyayishns are a collection of five Zoroastrian prayers which are part of the Khordeh Avesta. They are dedicated to the Zoroastrian divinities associated with the Sun (Hvare-khshaeta and Mithra), the Moon (Mah), the Waters (Aban and Anahita) and Fire (Atar).

== Overview ==
The Niyayishns are composed from diverse material drawn from other sources, in particular the individual yashts for the respective yazatas, and the gāhs which correspond to the period of the day at which the prayer is performed. In the Khordeh Avesta, the prayers are published jointly with translations in languages like Gujarati and Persian, which are the native languages of Zoroastrians in India and Iran. These translations help laypeople to perform these prayers.

== Xwarshed Niyayishn ==
The first prayer is the Xwarshed niyayishn, which is dedicated to Hvare-khshaeta, the yazata of the radiant sun. It is to be recited three gāhs, namely at the morning gāh (hāwan gāh), at the midday gāh (rapiθβin gāh), and at the evening gāh (uzīrin gāh). Stanzas 11-16 are drawn from the Xwarshed Yasht, i.e., the yasht dedicated to Hvare-khshaeta.

== Mihr Niyayishn ==
The second prayer is the Mihr niyayishn, which is dedicated to Mithra, the yazata of oaths, justice and the sun. Like the Xwarshed niyayishn, it is to be recited at the three gāhs. Due to the association of Mithra with the sun, the first nine stanzas are identical to the Xwarshed niyayishn, whereas the following ones are from the Mihr Yasht, i.e., yasht dedicated to Mithra.

== Mah Niyayishn ==
The Mah niyayishn is the third prayer and is dedicated to Mah, the yazata representing the Moon. It is to be recited three times per month, namely at new moon (antarə.māh), full moon (pərənō.māh), and one week after full moon (vīšaptaθa). The text of this niyayishn is drawn almost entirely from other sources. While most of the text is drawn from the Mah Yasht, i.e., the hymn dedicated to the Moon, two stanzas appear in the Vishtasp sast.

== Aban Niyayishn ==
The fourth prayer is the Aban niyayishn, which is also known as the Ardwi sur banu niyayishn. It is dedicated to the Waters and Aredvi Sura Anahita the yazata of the Waters. Due to the close connection of Anahita with water, both concepts are merged to a certain degree. The Aban niyayishn can be recited in the presence of water or at occasions associated with it. Most of its stanzas are taken from the Aban Yasht, i.e., the hymn dedicated to Anahita.

== Ataxsh Niyayishn ==
The fifth prayer is the Ataxsh niyayishn, which is dedicated to Atar, the personification of fire. Stanzas 7-16 are taken from Yasna 62.1-62.10, which itself is dedicated to the praise of Atar. In addition, it contains the Zoroastrian confession of faith, the Fravarāne, as well as the gāh corresponding to the time of the day. The prayer is intended for private use, while tending a fire.
