= Afrinagan =

Collection of Zoroastrian prayers

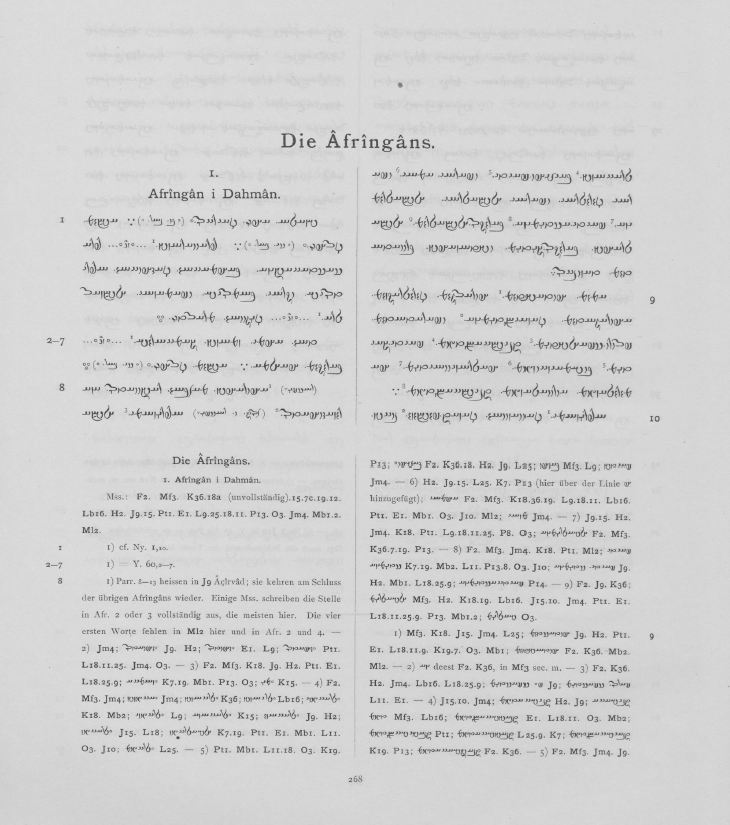
- First page of the Afrinagan collection in Geldner's edition

Information
- Religion: Zoroastrianism
- Language: Avestan
- Chapters: 5

Afrinagan, or Āfringān, is an Avestan term referring to either a collection of Zoroastrian prayers which are part of the Khordeh Avesta or to the ceremonies in which these prayers play a central role.

== Delineation of the term ==
The word Afrinagan is believed to be derived from Avestan āfri with the meaning of blessing. It is related to Sanskrit āpri, which refers to certain prayers said during an animal sacrifice. The word refers to both a number of rituals as well as the Avestan prayers used within them. The Afrinagan prayers have to be distinguished from the Afrin prayers, which are also used within the Afrinagan ceremonies but are in Middle Persian.

== The Afrinagan ceremony ==
According to Zoroastrian practice, the Afrinagan ceremony belongs to the outer ceremonies. This means that it can be performed outside of a ritually clean place, for example in a private home. Modern scholarship sometimes classifies them as belonging to the short liturgies.

Several versions of the Afrinagan ceremony exist depending on the occasion. Generally, they all consists of three stages, namely the Dibache, the Afrinagan proper and the Afrin. The ceremony is typically performed by two priests, a main priest, called Zod, and an assisting priest, called Raspi. The main priest takes part in all three stages, whereas the assistant joins in stage 2. The Dibache (Persian for preface) is the opening of the ceremony and is performed in Middle Persian. At this stage, the general outline of the ceremony, like the divinities to be praised, is announced. In the second stage, a number of Ahuna vairya manthras and Afrinagan prayers are performed. This part is consequently in Avestan. The number of Ahuna vairya prayers and the specific Afrinagan changes, depending on the specific type of ceremony. In the closing stage, the Afrin prayers are performed, which means the language is again Middle Persian. Like in the previous stage, the specific Afrin prayer to be recited may change depending on the ceremony. Alternatively, this stage may be omitted altogether.

== The Afrinagan prayers ==
The Afrinagan prayers are mostly extant as part of the Khordeh Avesta (little Avesta). This work is a collection of Avestan prayer texts mainly aimed at lay people. It includes a number of diverse texts drawn from other sourcese. The number of Afrinagan prayers which are included varies, but most manuscripts of the Khordeh Avesta contain four prayers, namely the Afrinagan i Dahman, Afrinagan i Gahan, Afrinagan i Gahanbar and the Afrinagan i Rapithwin.

The Afrinagan i Dahman is a prayer recited in honor of a deceased person on the forth day after death. It invokes the Dahman yazad, a divinity associated with guiding the dead to heaven. The Afrinagan i Gahan (Afrinagan of the Gathas) celebrate the last five days of the year, which are dedicated to the five Gathas. The Afrinagan i Gahanbar are performed during the six major seasonal festivals of the year, namely mid-spring (Maidyozarem), midsummer (Maidyoshahem), harvest feastival (Paitishahem), homecoming of the cattle (Ayathrem), midwinter (Maidyarem), and end of the year (Hamaspathmaidyem). Finally, the Afrinagan i Rapithwin is celebrated at the beginning or the end of the summer.
