= Mithra Temple of Maragheh =

Coordinates: 37.3322°N 46.2384°E

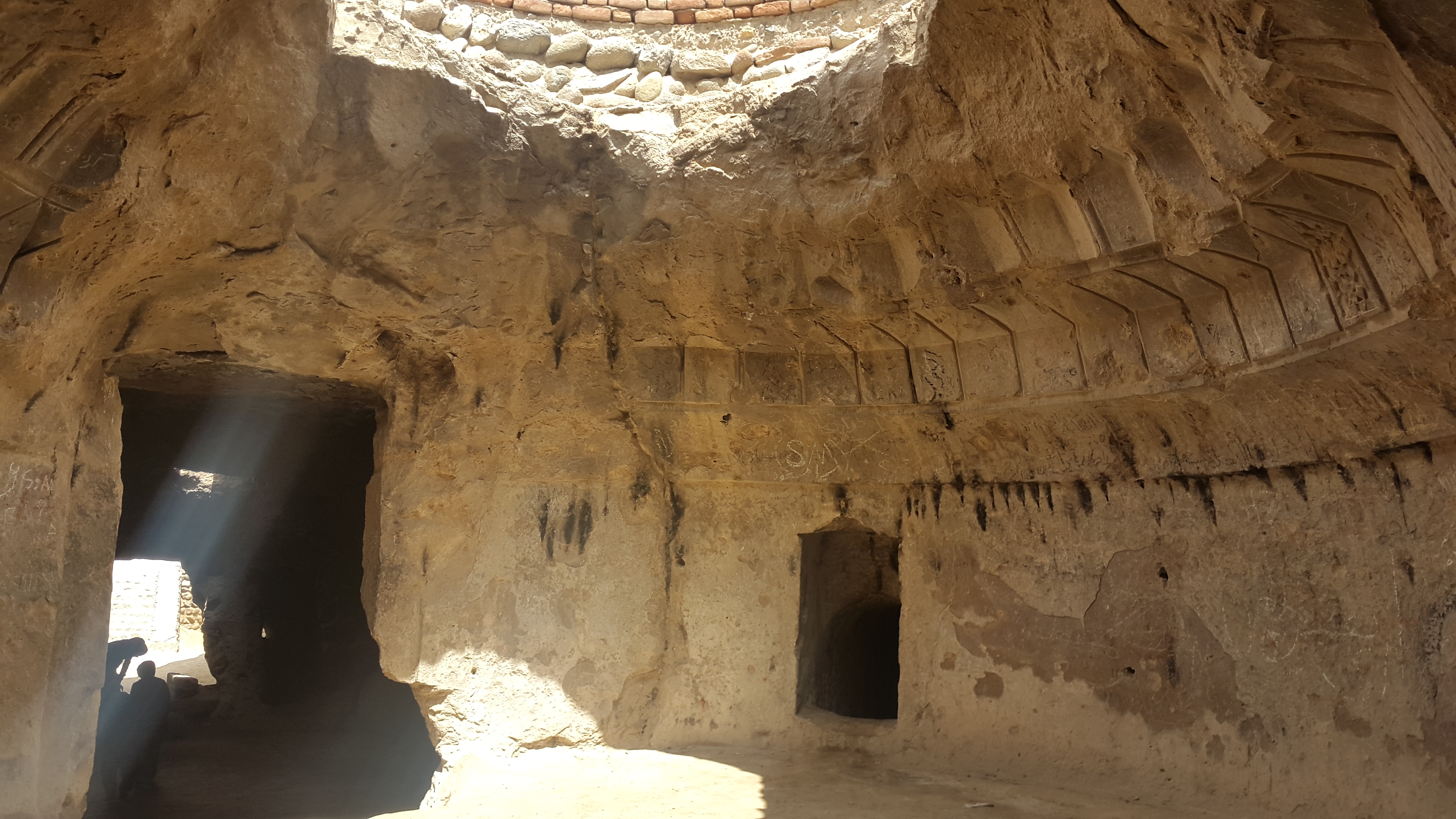
Mabad-Mehr

The Mithra Temple of Maragheh, also referred to as Mithra Temple of Verjuy or simply Mehr Temple, is a mysterious underground place of worship of the Indo-Iranian god Mitra (Avesta: Mithra; Skt: Mitra; Pahlavi: Mihr; NPer: Mihr/Mehr), dating back thousands of years, near the northwestern Iranian city of Maragheh. It is located 6 km south of Maragheh city in the village of Varjavi, East Azerbaijan province, and is one of the oldest surviving Mithraic temples in Iran.

== History ==
The first archaeologist to describe this site was Parviz Varjavand in the early 1970s.

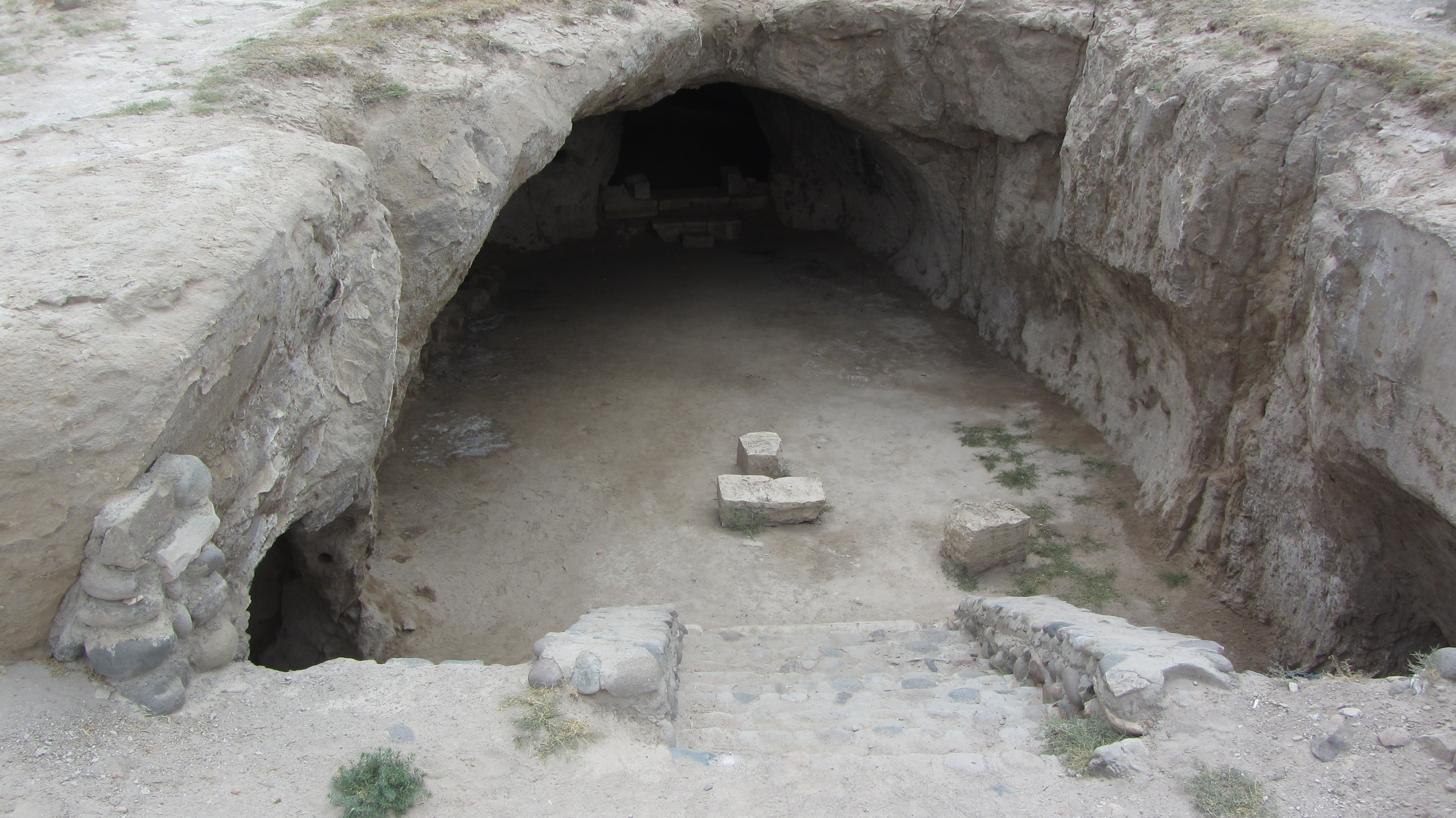
Mabad-Mehr

In 1973 he proposed it was a Mithraic Temple.

It dates back at least to the time of the Parthians (Arsacid dynasty) and is a stone-rock building located under an ancient cemetery.

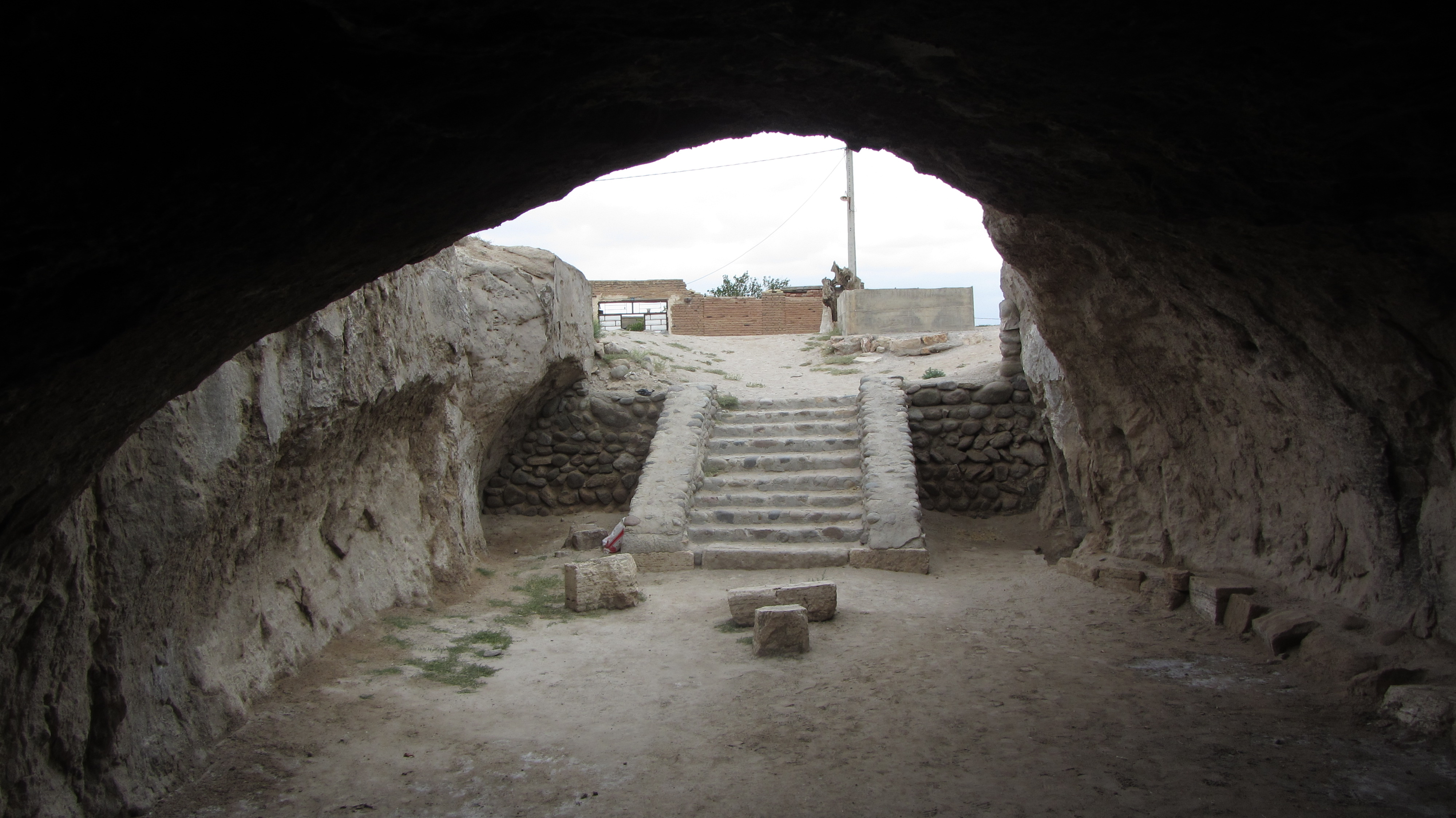
Mabad-Mehr

== Characteristics ==
This temple built by cutting a huge schist stone into the ground. The entrance of the temple to the very end of the altar measures approximately 38 m. The walls of the entrance corridor are made of natural rock. The width of this corridor varies between 4.70 and 7.20 m. A steep embankment leads to an underground corridor with a crescent-shaped ceiling at the entrance of the cave. The ceiling height of the corridor is 2.5 metres from the ground and the corridor is 17.60 metres long. The central corridor has many pits that connect to underground rooms with domed ceilings.

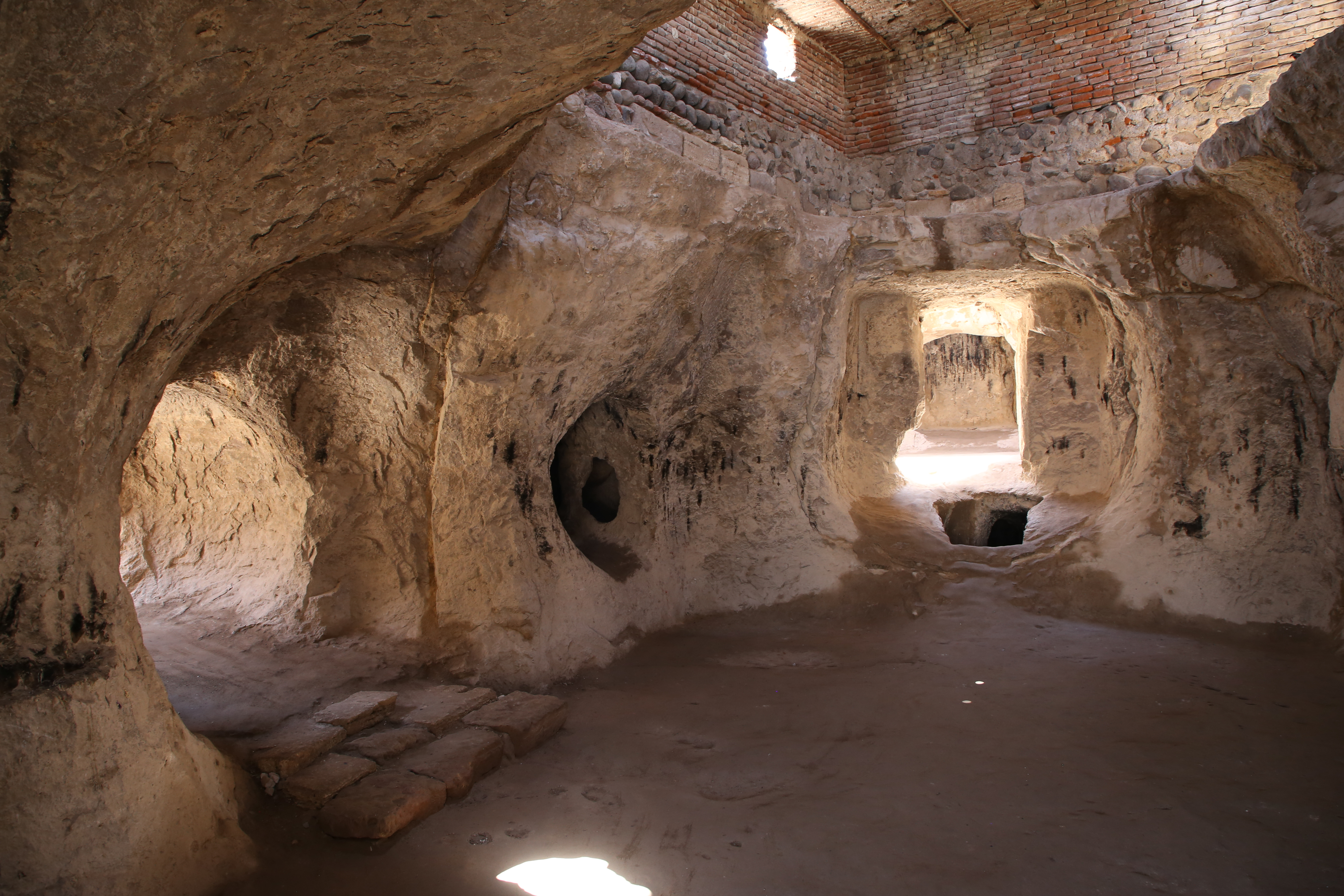
Niayeshmehr

This temple has many rooms connecting to each other that has been dug and carved in rocky underground.

To the left of the entrance in the heart of the rock a square-shaped space has been dug with the dimensions of 10 x10 meters and in the center there is a massive column with eight sides that divides this large room into four parts. At the top of each of these parts, there is a skylight that illuminates the place adequately. The eastern part of this rock has a small room whose ceiling has similarities with that of the Marāgheh observatory.

Like most rock-cut complexes across the world, this temple probably carved over time. few question activity there during the Mongol period related to Buddhist. Other structures were built in Azarbāygān from the Mongol period, an example of which can be seen in Azar Gushnasb fire temple.

In the center of the altar chamber a grave of the Islamic period is found which is known as the grave of Mullah Masoum Maraghei who was one of the well-known scholars of the eighteenth century of the region.

== See also ==
•Mithra

•Mehregan
