= Khorshid =

Khorshīd
Other names
- Related names: Hurşit

Khorshīd or Khorshēd (Persian: خورشید [xoɾˈʃid], meaning the Sun or the "Radiant Sun"), also spelled as Khurshed and Khurshid, is a Persian given name. In the modern day as well as historical Iran, Turkey, and Azerbaijan, but also in Iraqi Kurdistan, Egypt, Central Asia and South Asia, it is mostly a given name for boys. However in Iran, Khorshid is always a feminine name and given for girls. The origin of the word is related to the Avestan divinity Hvare-khshaeta. In Turkish, it is sometimes written as Hurşit.

== People ==
- Khurshid of Tabaristan (734-761), last Dabuyid ruler of Tabaristan
- Khurshid of Dailam (died 865), a Justanid king
- Khurshid Khan (died 1503), fifteenth-century minister of Sylhet
- Khurshid Ahmad (scholar) (1932-2025), Pakistani economist and politician
- Khurshed Alam Khan (1919-2013), Indian Congress Party senior leader
- Khurshed Mahmudov (born 1982), Tajikistani footballer
- Khurshed Nariman (1883-1948), Mayor of Mumbai (1935–1936)
- Khursheed Bano (1914–2001), pioneer film actress and singer of the Indian cinema
- Khurshid Ahmad (disambiguation)
- Khurshid Mahmud Kasuri (born 1941), Pakistani politician and diplomat
- Khershed Meherhomji (1911–1982), Indian cricketer
- Khurshid Rizvi (born 1942), Pakistani poet

=== Surname ===
- Khurshid Hasan Khurshid (1924–1988), first elected president of Azad Kashmir, Private secretary of Muhammad Ali Jinnah
- Omar Khorshid, (1945–1981), Egyptian instrumental guitarist
- Salman Khurshid (born 1953), Indian Congress Party politician

== Places ==
- Khorshid, Iran (disambiguation)

== Other ==
- Khurshid TV, Afghan television station

== See also ==
- Khorshid (newspaper)
- Khorshidi dynasty
