= Kangelo Castle =

Castle in Iran

Kangelo Castle قلعه کنگلو
- Archaeological site
- Interactive map of Kangelo Castle
- Coordinates: 35.93927°N 53.15474°E
- Country: Iran
- Province: Mazandaran
- County: Savadkuh
- Bakhsh: Central
- Time zone: UTC+3:30 (IRST)
  - Summer (DST): UTC+4:30 (IRDT)

Kangelo Castle (Persian: قلعه کنگلو) is a historical fortress located in Kangelo Village, Savadkuh County, Mazandaran Province, Iran. Kangelo Castle was built during the Sasanian era. According to historians, this castle was used as a place to worship the Mithra.

== Gallery ==
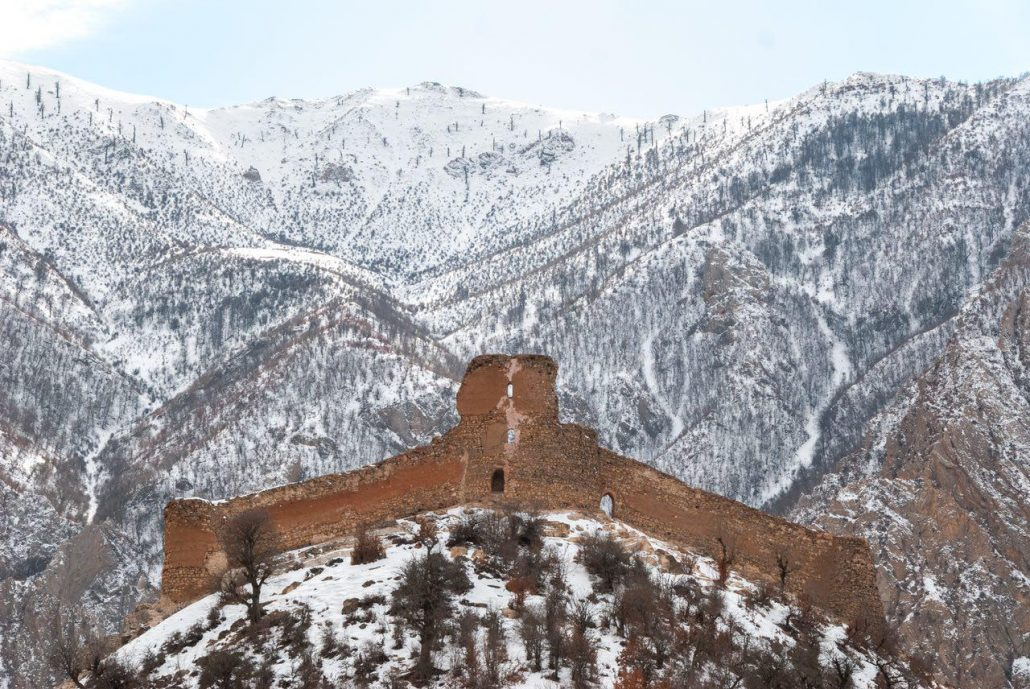

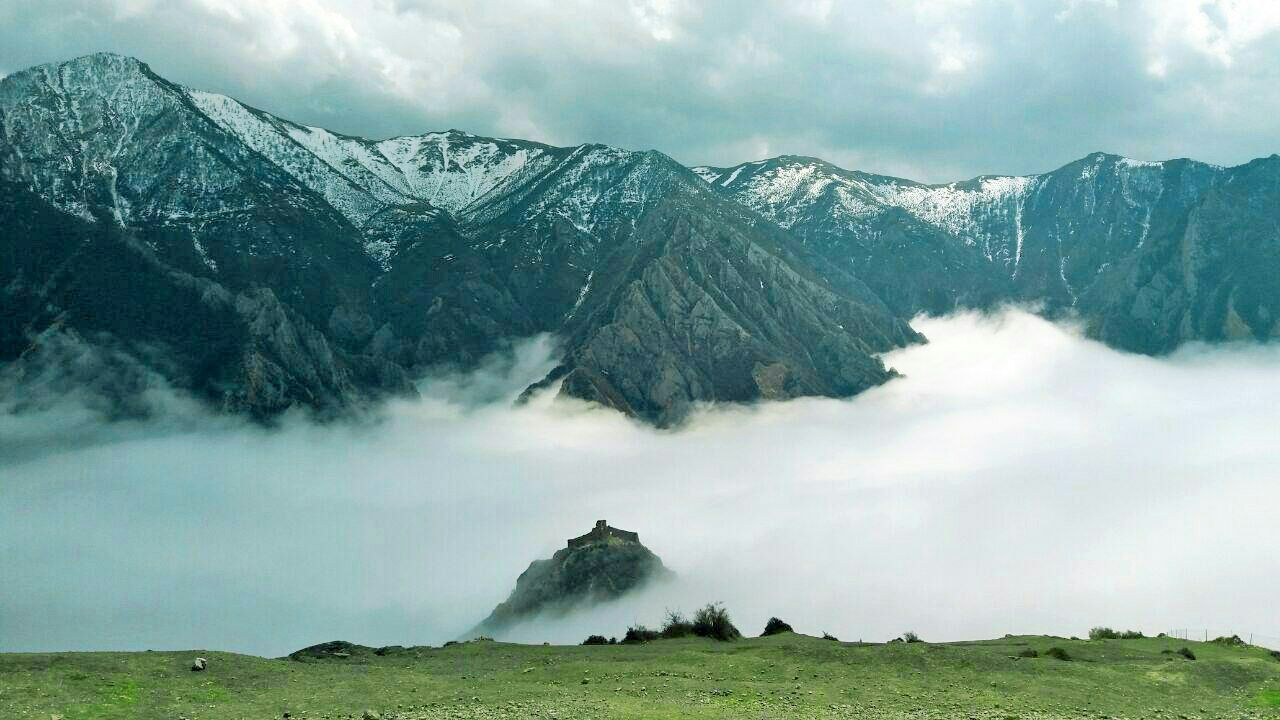
