= Khvorshid =

Khvorshid or Khowrshid (Persian: خورشيد), sometimes rendered as Khorshid, may refer to:

- Khowrshid, Khuzestan
- Khvorshid, Mazandaran
