= Khurshid TV =

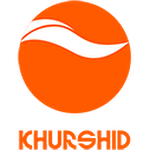
- Country: Afghanistan
- Headquarters: Kabul

History
- Launched: 22 February 2011; 14 years ago

Links
- Website: https://khurshid.tv/

Khurshid TV (Dari: تلویزیون خورشید) is an Afghan general entertainment television station based in Kabul.

== History ==
The channel was launched in 2011. The name of the channel is a Persian name meaning sun (see Khorshid).

Two Khurshid TV employees were wounded when their van was targeted by a bomb in Kabul in August 2019. During the May 2020 Afghanistan attacks, a Khurshid TV vehicle was apparently the target in a roadside bomb in Kabul. A journalist at Khurshid TV was killed along with the driver. The attack was widely condemned by Afghan journalists, the government and internationally. In 2021, Pahjwok Afghan News reported that some Khurshid employees had not been paid their salaries for three months. After the Taliban takeover of Afghanistan, Khurshid TV went off air.

The station's CEO was Mohammad Rafi Rafiq Sediqi. Sediqi died in November 2020 from suspected gas poisoning.
