= Hurşit =

Hurşit (Turkish pronunciation: [huɾˈʃit]) is a masculine given name derived from Persian Khorshid. It may refer to:

- Hurshid Pasha (died 1822), Ottoman general and Grand Vizier
- Hurşit Atak (born 1991), Turkish weightlifter
- Hurşit Güneş (born 1957), Turkish economist and politician
- Hurşit Tolon (born 1942), retired Turkish general
- Ziya Hurşit (1892–1926), Turkish politician

== Hurşut ==
- Hurşut Meriç (born 1983), Dutch professional footballer of Turkish descent
