= Mah Yasht =

Zoroastrian religious hymn

- ← Xwarshed Yasht Tishtar Yasht →
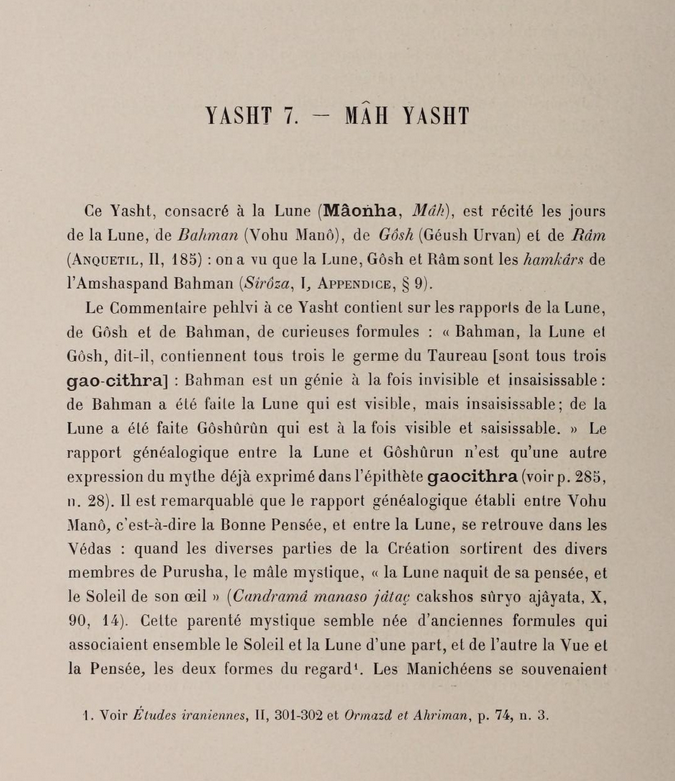
- First page of the Mah Yasht in Darmesteter's French translation

Information
- Religion: Zoroastrianism
- Language: Avestan
- Period: Avestan period
- Verses: 7

The Mah Yasht is the seventh hymn of the Yashts. It is named after and dedicated to Mah, the Avestan term for the Moon.

== Overview ==
Mah is the Middle Persian name of the Moon as well as the 12th day of the month. Within the collection of 21 Yashts, the Mah Yasht is the seventh hymn. It does not follow the divisions into kardas, as is common for many yashts, and with only seven stanzas, it one of the shorter hymns in the collection. In addition, its poetic meter is regarded as defective and its overall literary quality as mediocre. Consequently, it is classified as one of the so called Minor Yashts.

== Structure and content ==
Apart from the opening and closing formulas, the Mah Yasht contains seven stanzas. The main part is formed by stanzas 1-5. They mostly describe the phases of the moon. The closing part is formed by stanzas 6 and 7. These stanzas contain material also found in other yashts, but have been revised to insert references to the moon.

== Editions and translations ==
Like most of the other yashts, the manuscripts containing the Mah Yasht do not provide a translation of the text. However, the manuscripts of the Mah Nyaishn, which contains the full text of the Mah Yasht, do come with a variety of translations provided by Zoroastrian priest at different points in time. The oldest translation is into Middle Persian, which may have been created already during the Sasanian Empire. In addition, different manuscripts also contain translations into Sanskrit, Gujarati and Modern Persian.

In 1908, Dhalla, provided a translation of the Avestan, Middle Persian, Sankskit and Gujarati version of Mah Nyaishn into English. Most modern translations are, however, based on the edition of the Mah Yasht by Geldner. Darmesteter provided an English translation of the yasht in 1883 and a French translation in 1892. In 1927, Lommel provided a translation into German as part of his seminal translation of the Yasht collection. A critical edition of the yasht including a translation into Italian was published by Panaino.
