= Asman =

Zoroastrian divinity

- God of the Sky
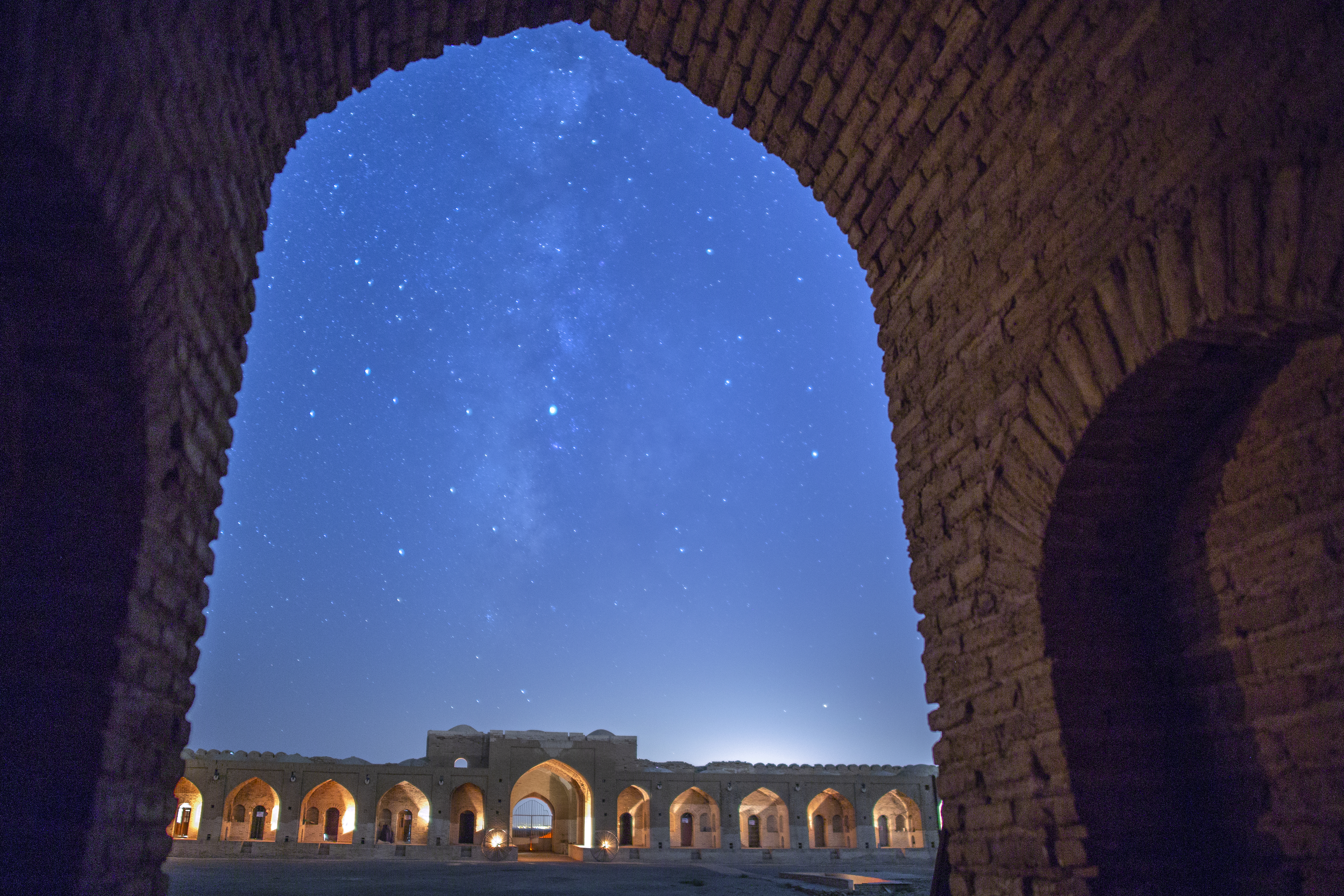
- Starry Sky at Deir Gachin Caravanserai from the Sassanid Empire era
- Avestan: Asman 𐬀𐬯𐬨𐬀𐬥
- Affiliation: The Thirty-Three Deities, Guardians of the Days of the Month
- Abode: The Seven Celestial Spheres, The Place of Ohrmazd
- Weapon: Thunder
- Symbol: Blue Sky, Seven Spheres, Stars, Brightness, Water Drop, Cosmic dome
- Sacred Flower: Haoma
- Attributes: God of the Sky, God of the universe, Guardian of Light, Guardian of Joy and Truth, First Being
- Associated Deities: Mithra, Hvare-khshaeta, Kshatra Vairya
- Day: 27th of each month in the Iranian calendar
- Mount: Chariot pulled by Wind and Eagle
- Gender: male
- Festivals: Maidyozarem

Equivalents
- Greek: Uranus
- Roman: Jupiter
- Indian: Dyaus

Asman (Avestan: 𐬀𐬯𐬨𐬀𐬥, romanized: asman) is the Avestan and Middle Persian name of the Zoroastrian divinity that is the hypostasis of the sky. Asman is the "highest heaven," and is distinguished from the firmament, 𐬚𐬡𐬁𐬴𐬀 (θβāṣ̌a), which lies nearer the earth. The 27th day of the Zoroastrian calendar is dedicated to him. In the Veda, अश्मन (áśman) means 'sky'. It also means "stone" so the specific sense in reference to the sky is as "stony firmament".

In the Avesta, specifically in the Vendidad, the word is mentioned as being the first thing created. The word is also the origination of the word آسمان (âsmân) in modern Persian and numerous languages of South Asia.

== Bibliography ==
- Gershevitch, Ilya; Fisher, William Bayne (1985). Cambridge History of Iran. Cambridge University Press.
