= Zoroastrian prayer =

Prayer in Zoroastrianism

Zoroastrian prayer covers a wide range of invocations and utterances, aimed at connecting the faithful with Ahura Mazda or other Zoroastrian divinities. They may be performed in private, in public or at a fire temple.

The practice of prayer has changed considerable over the centuries. In Old Iranian times, manthras were common. During the Middle Iranian period, non-Avestan prayers like the nirang and the monajat became common. In modern times, the wide availability of printed literature like the Khordeh Avesta had a noticeable effect on Zoroastrian prayer practice.

== Definition ==
In general, prayers are interpreted as a means to establish a connection between a person saying the prayer and a deity to whom the prayer is addressed. In the Western tradition, they are distinguished from the broader canon of religious texts, which are considered revelations of the divine to humanity. This distinction is not directly applicable to Zoroastrianism, where texts such as the Gathas or the Yashts are considered human performances addressed to the divine. As a result, there is no clear distinction between prayers and liturgy in Zoroastrianism.

== Types of prayer ==
=== Manthra ===
During the Old Iranian period, an important type of prayer were manthras, in particular the Ahuna Vairya, the Ashem Vohu, the Yenghe hatam, and the Airyaman ishya. These four prayers are composed in the Old Avestan language like the Gathas of Zarathustra. They are assumed to have been authored by either Zarathustra himself or his early followers. Zoroastrian manthras share a number of functional similarities with the mantras which originated from Vedic religion of Ancient India and must, therefore, go back to a common Indo-Iranian tradition.

=== Afrinagan ===
The Afrinagan are a type of prayer that are performed by priests during the eponymous liturgical service. It is believed that the term is derived from Avestan āfri and is related to Sanskrit āpri, which refers to certain prayers said during an animal sacrifice. During the rite, the proper afrinagan prayers are performed jointly with the Ahuna Vairya and the Ashem Vohu mantras as well as the Gāh formula pertaining to the period of the day.

=== Nirang ===
The nirang are short, standardized incantations that typically accompany specific occasions. Although some nirangs contain Avestan passages, they are mostly composed in Middle Persian written in Pazend. They consequently originated during the Middle Iranian period, when Avestan was no longer understood. In a certain sense, they can be considered the continuation of the Old Iranian mantra tradition, since they are spoken primarily for their perceived inherent power instead of conveying some personal experience.

=== Monajat ===
The monajat tradition of prayers evolved relatively late in the 13th century and shows Islamic influence. In contrast to more traditional forms of prayer, which are usually in Avestan, monajat prayers are performed in the native language of the faithful, typically in Persian or Gujarati for Iranian and Indian Zoroastrians, respectively. They show a wide variety and can be composed in verse or in prose.

== Practice ==
The most common form of prayer occurs during the daily five times of prayer. They are connected to the five divisions of the day. Zoroastrians pray standing and direct their prayers to a source of light, like a fire, or a lamp. The prayers are drawn from the Khordeh Avesta and can be mixed with personal prayers.

Religious historian Khaled Kabir Allal suggests that Zoroastrianism originally had only three prayers: at sunrise, at midday, and at sunset. He cites Muslim historians and researchers of the Avesta, the holy book of the Zoroastrians, who describe three prayers. He suggests that the current five daily prayers among Zoroastrians are a result of the influence of the Behafaridians, which blended Islam and Zoroastrianism.

== See also ==
- Ashem Vohu
- Ahuna Vairya
