= Hvare-khshaeta =

Iranian Avestan divinity

- God of Sun and Warmth
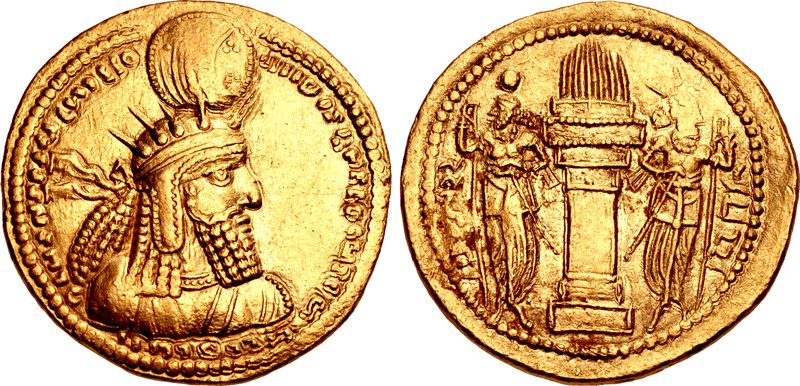
- Coin of Bahram I, wearing a Solar Crown.
- Other names: Xur, Hvar, Xvarasht
- Affiliation: The Thirty-Three Deities, Guardians of the Days of the Month, Seven Ancient Planets
- Abode: Top of Mount Alborz
- Symbol: Light, Fire, Sun
- Sacred flower: Salvia macrosiphon
- Attributes: Immortal, Glorious, Swift-Horsed
- Day: 11th of each month in the Iranian calendar
- Mount: Chariot
- Gender: Male
- Festivals: Khorram Rooz
- Associated deities: Mithra, Kshatra Vairya, Asman

Equivalents
- Greek: Helios
- Roman: Sol
- Indian: Surya

Hvare-khshaeta (Hvarə-xšaēta, Huuarə-xšaēta) is the Avestan language name of the Zoroastrian yazata (divinity) of the "Radiant Sun".

Avestan Hvarə-xšaēta is a compound in which huuarᵊ "sun" has xšaēta "radiant" as a stock epithet. Avestan hvar derives from Proto-Indo-Iranian *súHar "sun", from which the Vedic Sanskrit theonym Surya also derives. In Middle Persian, Hvarə-xšaēta was contracted to Khwarshēd, continuing in New Persian as Khurshēd/Khorshīd (cf. a similar contraction of Avestan Yima-xšaēta as Jamshid).

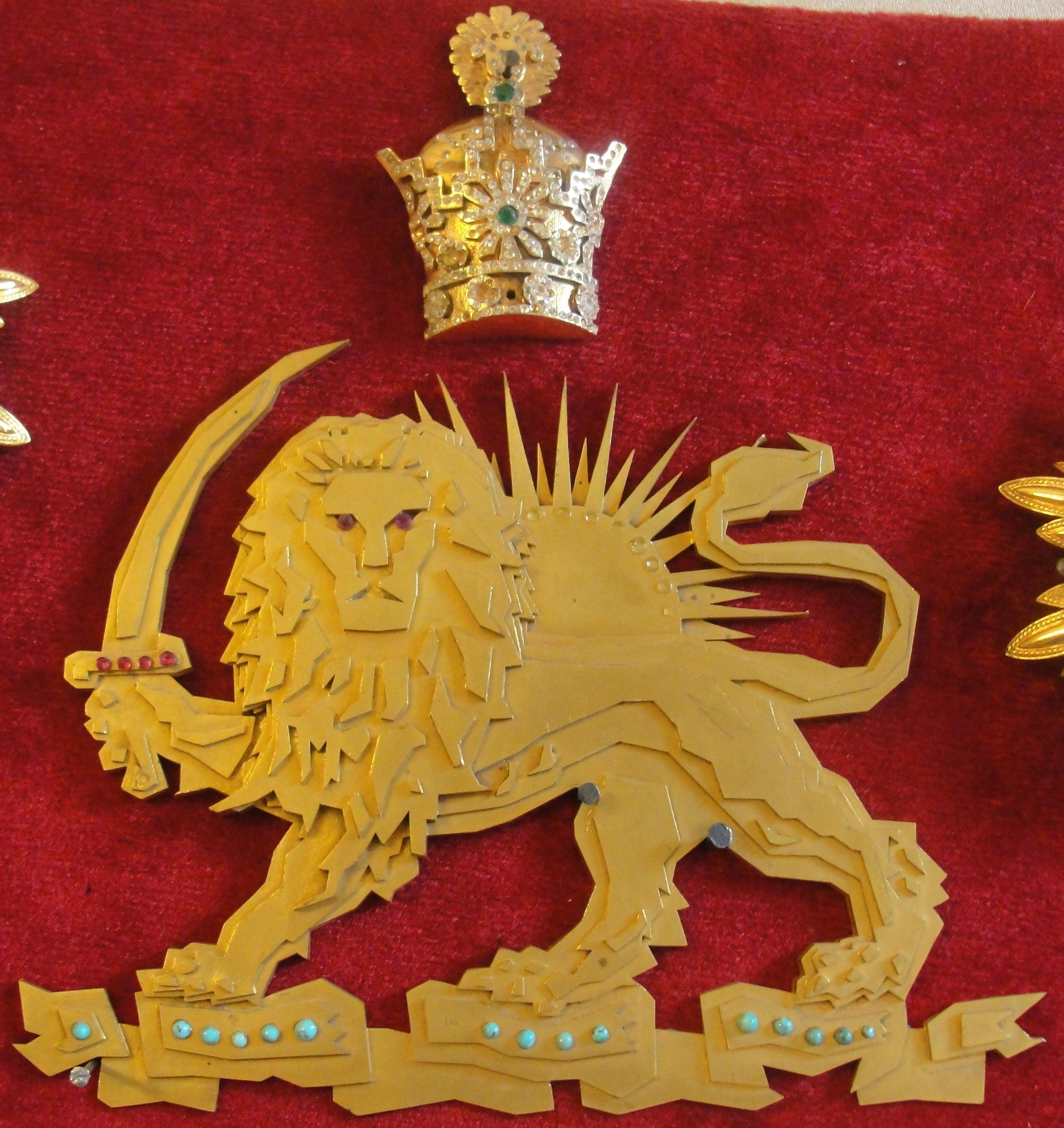
Lion and sun, a typical Iranian solar symbol.

The short seven-verse 6th Yasht is dedicated to Hvarə-xšaēta, as is also the Avesta's litany to the Sun. The 11th day of the Zoroastrian calendar is dedicated to and is under the protection of Hvarə-xšaēta. Although in tradition Hvarə-xšaēta would eventually be eclipsed by Mithra as the divinity of the Sun (this is attributed to "late" syncretic influences, perhaps to a conflation with Akkadian Shamash), in scripture the Sun is still unambiguously the domain of Hvarə-xšaēta and remains distinct from the divinity of "Covenant".

The Slavic deity Hors has been generally considered to be etymologically related to Hvarə-xšaēta, and possibly the result of Persian armies introducing their form of solar worship to Slavic peoples around the first millennium BC. However, this is not without criticism, as the etymological connection between both gods has been called into question.

== See also ==
- List of solar deities
