= Khorshid (newspaper) =

Iranian daily newspaper (2008–2009)

- Type: Daily newspaper
- Format: Tabloid
- Owner: Social Security Organization
- Founded: October 2008
- Ceased publication: March 2009
- Language: Persian
- Headquarters: Tehran
- Country: Iran

Khorshid (Persian: خورشید, lit. 'The Sun') was a daily newspaper published in Tehran, Iran, briefly between October 2008 and March 2009. The daily supported former Iranian President Mahmoud Ahmedinejad.

== History and profile ==
Khorshid was established in October 2008 by Muhammad Paryab who was an aide to the former President Mahmoud Ahmedinejad. The paper was owned by a state institution named the Social Security Organization. The daily was managed by Saeed Mortazavi.

Khorshid was a full color tabloid daily and provided news about all topics from political issues to sports and soap operas. Robert Tait of The Guardian described it as The Sun newspaper of Iran. Khorshid folded in March 2009 due to the economic problems and resignation of journalists.

== Political leaning ==
The daily advocated Mahmoud Ahmedinejad in the 2009 presidential election.
