= Khordeh Avesta =

Zoroastrian religious texts

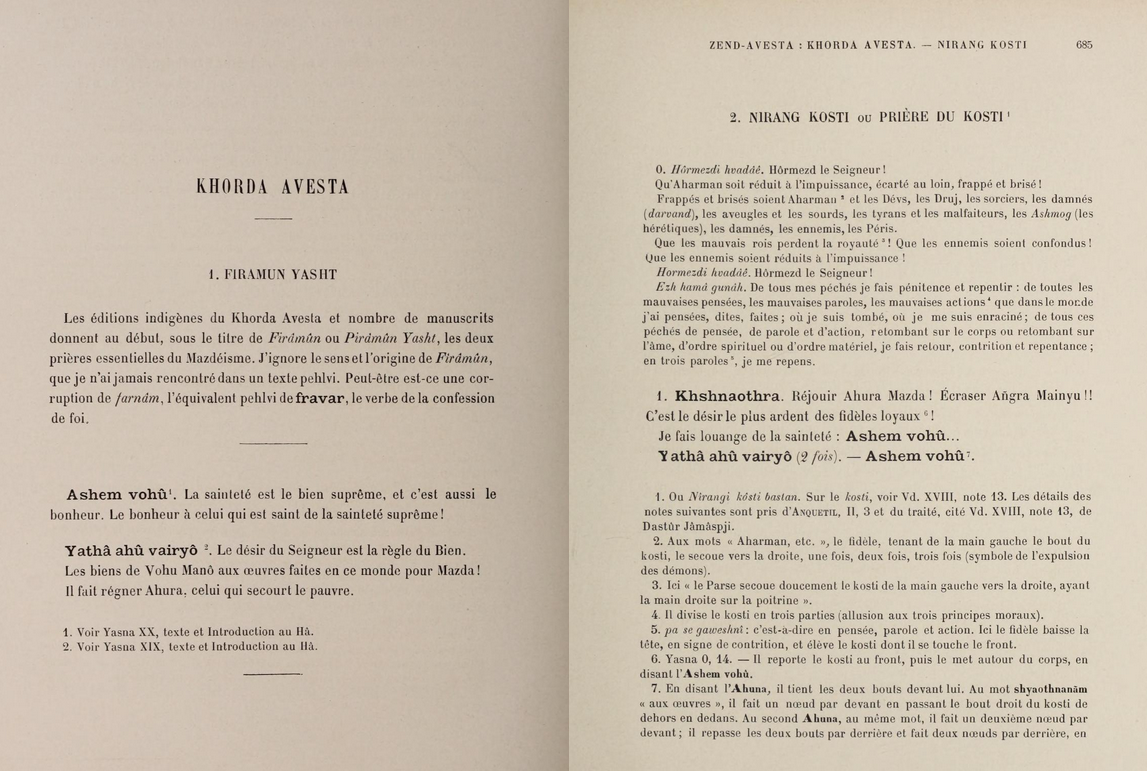
- First two pages of Darmesteter's French translation of the Khordeh Avesta

Information
- Religion: Zoroastrianism
- Language: Avestan

Khordeh Avesta, meaning Little Avesta, refers to diverse Zoroastrian anthologies comprising short devotional texts and daily prayers aimed primarily at lay people. These prayers are mostly in Avestan but some collections also contain prayers in Persian and Gujarati.

== Name ==
The Modern Persian term Khordeh Avesta is derived from Middle Persian hwltk ʾp(y)stʾkʼ (xwurdag abestag). Here, Avesta refers to the collection of sacred texts of Zoroastrianism, whereas xwurdag is Middle Persian for small, minor or little. The name therefore means Little Avesta or Minor Avesta. This Minor Avesta is often seen in contrast to the Great Avesta of the Sasanan period. Next to Khordeh Avesta, other scholarly transliterations of the name include Khorde Avesta, Khorda Avesta, Ḵorda Avesta or Xorde Avesta.

== Deleniation of the term ==
The Khordeh Avesta collections are very heterogeneous and in modern scholarship, the manuscripts are, therefore, grouped into two or three main classes. The largest class contains a number of short liturgies, like the Niyayishn, the Afrinagan, and several shorter Yashts. They have been labeled the Khordeh Avesta "in the proper sense of the term." The second class are the so called Tamam Khorda Avesta manuscripts. Here, Tamam is Gujarati for complete. As the name implies, they are found among Indian Zoroastrians, and contain a more complete collection of hymns, in particular, a full collection of all Yashts. Sometimes, pure Yasht manuscripts are also classified as Khorda Avesta, but most consider them to be a distinct class of short liturgies. In the following, we will focus on the first class, i.e., the Khordeh Avesta "in the proper sense of the term."

== Manuscripts ==
The extant manuscripts of the Khordeh Avesta can be classified according to a number of traits. They have been analyzed by König and grouped into whether they contain a translation or not, the languange of the translation, the script which is used and whether they originated from the Iranian or Indian Zoroastrian communities:

Classes of Khordeh Avesta manuscripts
Group	Without translation (Sāde)				With translation					
Translation					Middle Persian		Sanskrit	Modern Persian		Gujarati
Origin	Iran		India		Iran	India	India	Iran	India	India
Script	Avestan	Persian	Avestan	Gujarati						
Oldest manuscript (Year)	MF3 (1700)	Katrak96abc (1735 + 1789)	Jm4 (1352)	Katrak515 (1743)	F2 (1726)	T12 (1552)	K1 (1343/44)	MF28 (1706)	R21 (1774)	U63 (1555)

Here the top category classifies according to whether the manuscript contains a translation or not.This category is similar to the classification of manuscripts of the Long Liturgy. However, manuscripts of the Long Liturgy with translations are used by priests for exegetical pruposes, whereas the translations of the Short Liturgies allows lay people to understand their content. Consequently, none of them have a Zend.

== Structure and content ==
Even manuscripts of the proper Khordeh Avesta show pronounced differences. Hardly two manuscripts are exact copies of one another and no attempt at a text critical stemmatic has ever been attempted. In his seminal edition of the Avestan corpus, Geldner referred to the Khordeh Avesta as a mere Sammelsurium (hodgepodge). However, more recently, König has analyzed the available manuscripts of this type and identified the core structure, which is found therein.

Arrangement of different texts in different Khordeh Avesta manuscript types
Stable texts	Unstable texts	Sade	Middle Persian	Modern Persian	Sanskrit	Gujarati
Introductory prayers		most	most	most	most	most
Niyayishn		most	most	most	most	most
	Afringan	some	few			few
	Gāh	most	most	some		most
Yashts		most	most	most	most	most
	Afringan		some	most	most	some
Sih-rozag			some			
Minor texts					some	some
	Gāh	some				some
	Afringan	some	few			some
Minor texts		most	few	some		some

A common structure of the proper Khordeh Avesta would, therefore, be bookended by some introductory prayers and final minor texts, whereas the core would consist of the Niyayishn, the Gāh, some of the Yashts, and the Afringan. König has, furthermore, argued that the arrangement of the prayers in the Khordeh Avesta is organized according to the occasions on which Zoroastrians are supposed to perform them.
