= Fayyazabad =

Fayyazabad فياض اباد
- Village
- Location within Iran
- Coordinates: 31°53′49″N 48°52′47″E
- Country: Iran
- Province: Khuzestan
- County: Shushtar
- Bakhsh: Central
- Rural District: Miyan Ab

Population (2006)
  - Total: 174
- Time zone: UTC+3:30 (IRST)
  - Summer (DST): UTC+4:30 (IRDT)

Fayyazabad (Persian: فياض اباد, also Romanized as Fayyāẕābād; also known as Khowrshīd) is a village in Miyan Ab Rural District, in the Central District of Shushtar County, Khuzestan Province, Iran. At the 2006 census, its population was 174, in 32 families.
