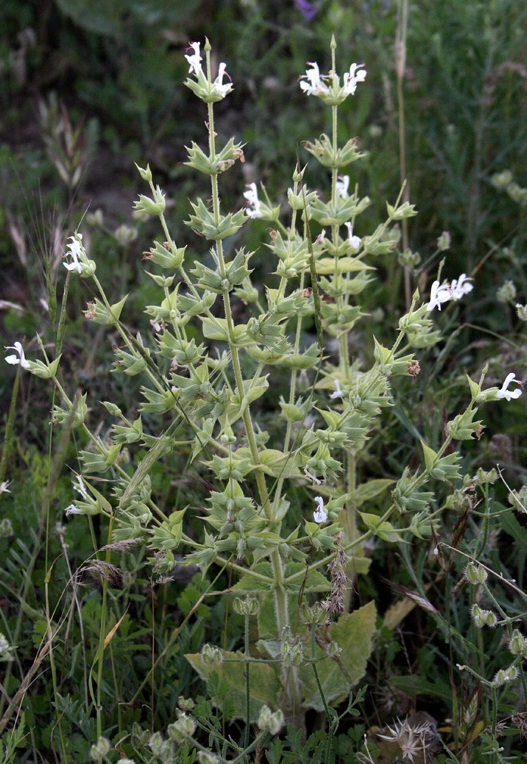

Scientific classification
- Kingdom: Plantae
- Clade: Tracheophytes
- Clade: Angiosperms
- Clade: Eudicots
- Clade: Asterids
- Order: Lamiales
- Family: Lamiaceae
- Genus: Salvia
- Species: S. macrosiphon

Binomial name
- Salvia macrosiphon Boiss.

Synonyms
- Salvia albifrons Nábelek; Salvia cuspidatissima Pau; Salvia kotschyi Boiss. Salvia macrosiphonia St.-Lag. Salvia nachiczevanica Pobed.

= Salvia macrosiphon =

Species of plant in the mint family

Salvia macrosiphon is a species of flowering plant in the family Lamiaceae. It is native to Iraq, Iran, Pakistan, Afghanistan, Transcaucasia, and Turkey, where it grows at the edges of fields. It is a perennial herb with a white corolla and ovate nutlets. It flowers in May and fruits from June onwards. Although the plant is similar to S. spinosa, it differs in that it has narrower leaves and calyces, is less indurate and has less spiny fruiting calyces, and possesses a longer corolla tube.
