= Mehregan =

Zoroastrian and Iranian festival

Mehregan مهرگان
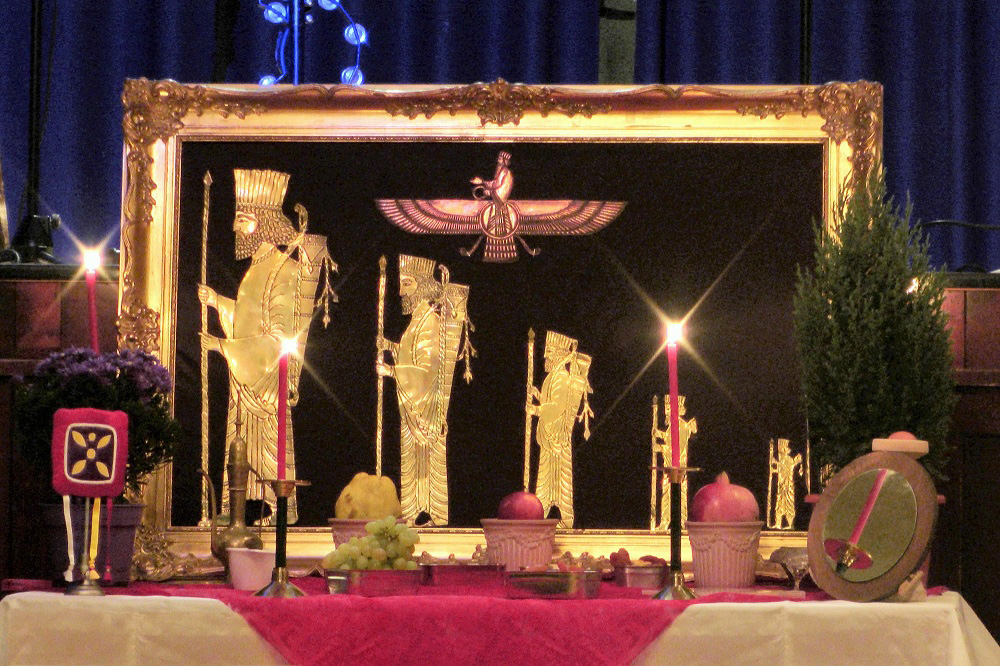
- Mehregan table at a celebration in the Netherlands, 2011
- Also called: Jašn-e Mehr جشن مهر
- Observed by: Iran; Azerbaijan; Afghanistan; Kurdistan; Tajikistan; Uzbekistan
- Type: Monthly Celebrations in Ancient Persia
- Significance: Victory of Fereydoun King of the Seven Kingdoms over Zahhak
- Celebrations: Wearing purple clothing, gathering together, exchanging greeting cards, setting up the Mehregan table, commemorating the triumph of good over evil, dancing accompanied by special music.
- Date: October 1–2, October 8
- Frequency: Annual
- Related to: Mithra

Ceremony of Mehregan
- UNESCO Intangible Cultural Heritage
- Country: Iran and Tajikistan
- Reference: 02144
- Region: Asia and the Pacific

Inscription history
- Inscription: 2024 (19th session)
- List: Representative

Mehregan (Persian: مهرگان) or Jashn-e Mehr (جشن مهر lit. Mithra Festival) is an Iranian festival celebrated to honor the Zoroastrian yazata Mithra (Persian: Mehr), which is responsible for friendship, affection and love.

== Name ==
Persian "Mehregân" (Celebration of Mehr) is derived from the Middle Persian expression Mihragān, itself derived from Old Persian Mithrakāna or Mithracina.

== Introduction ==
Mehregan is an Iranian festival honoring the Zoroastrian yazata Mithra. Under the Achaemenid Empire (550–330 BC), the Armenian subjects of the Persian king gave him 20,000 horses every year during the celebration of Mehregan. Under the Sasanian Empire (224–651), Mehregan was the second most important festival, falling behind Nowruz. Due to these two festivals being heavily connected with the role of Iranian kingship, the Sasanian rulers were usually crowned on either Mehregan or Nowruz.

In Biruni's eleventh-century Book of Instructions in the Elements of the Art of Astrology (233), the astronomer observed that "some people have given the preference to Mihragān [over Nowruz, i.e. New Year's day/Spring Equinox] by as much as they prefer autumn to spring."

As Biruni also does for the other festival days he mentions, he reiterates a local anecdotal association for his description of Mehregan with a fragment of a tale from Iranian folklore: On this day, Fereydun vanquished the evil Zahhak and confined him to Mount Damavand. This fragment of the legend is part of a greater cycle that ties Mehrgan with Nowruz; Dahak vanquished Jamshid (who the legends have as the one establishing Nowruz or New Year's Day), and Fereydun vanquishes Zahhak, so restoring the balance. The association of Mehregan with the polarity of spring/autumn, sowing/harvest and the birth/rebirth cycle did not escape Biruni either, for as he noted, "they consider Mihragān as a sign of resurrection and the end of the world, because at Mihragān that which grows reaches perfection."

== In ancient times ==
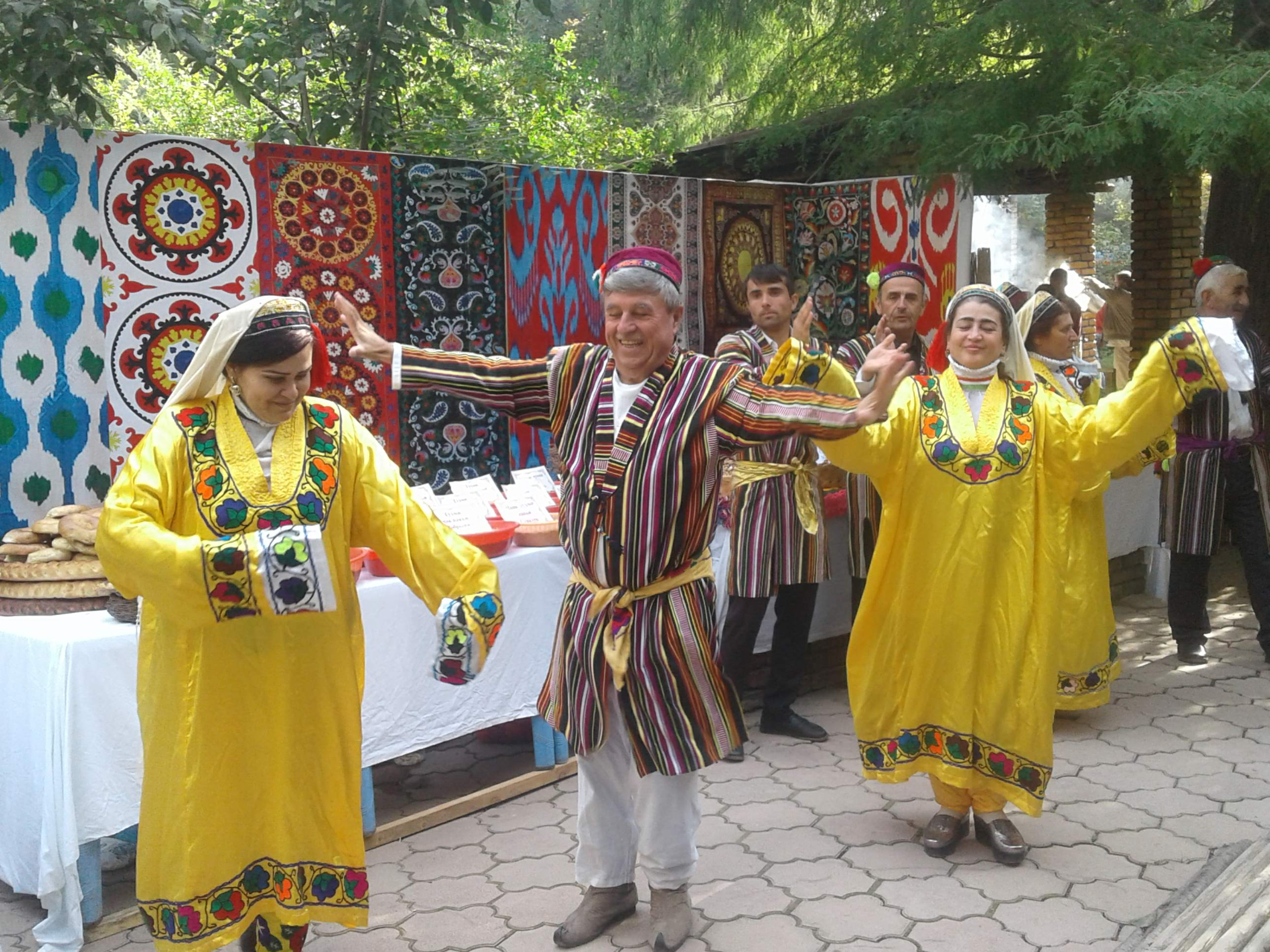
Tajiks celebrate Mehregan in Dushanbe

Mehregān was celebrated in an extravagant style at Persepolis. Not only was it the time for harvest, but it was also the time when the taxes were collected. Visitors from different parts of the Persian Empire brought gifts for the king all contributing to a lively festival.

Mehregān is celebrated with the same magnificence and pageantry as Nowruz. In ancient times, it was customary for people to send or give their king, and each other, gifts. Rich people usually gave gold and silver coins, heroes and warriors gave horses while others gave gifts according to their financial power and ability, even as simple as an apple. Those fortunate enough would help the poor with gifts.

Gifts to the royal court of over ten thousand gold coins were registered. If the gift-giver needed money at a later time, the court would then return twice the gift amount. Kings gave two audiences a year: one audience at Nowruz and other at Mehregān. During the Mehregān celebrations, the king wore a fur robe and gave away all his summer clothes.

== In the present-day ==
On October 2, 2022, which coincided with Mehregan, there were series of ceremonies conducted across Iran. These ceremonies were involved in the provinces of Tehran, Yazd, Kurdistan, West Azerbaijan, Zanjan, Sistan and Baluchestan, Isfahan, Bushehr, North Khorasan, and Golestan.

== Basis for the date ==
As noted above, Mehregān is a name-day feast. These name-day feasts are festivals celebrated on the day of the year when the day-name and month-name dedicated to a particular angel or virtue intersect. Ancient Persia had 30-days months, which means that each day in a month had a different name, with 12 of the days also being names of the 12 months. The day whose name corresponded to the name of the month was celebrated.

== See also ==
- List of festivals in Iran
- Zoroastrian festivals

== Sources ==
- Boyce, Mary (1983). "Iranian festivals". In Yarshater, Ehsan (ed.). The Cambridge History of Iran. Vol. 3(2). Cambridge: Cambridge University Press. pp. 792–816. doi:10.1017/CHOL9780521200929.006. ISBN 0-521-24693-8.
- Boyce, Mary; Grenet, Frantz (1991). Beck, Roger (ed.). A History of Zoroastrianism, Zoroastrianism under Macedonian and Roman Rule. Leiden: Brill. ISBN 978-9004293915.
- Calmard, J. (1993). "Mihragān". In Bosworth, C. E.; van Donzel, E.; Heinrichs, W. P. & Pellat, Ch. (eds.). The Encyclopaedia of Islam, Second Edition. Volume VII: Mif–Naz. Leiden: E. J. Brill. pp. 15–20. ISBN 978-90-04-09419-2.
- Canepa, Matthew (2018). The Iranian Expanse: Transforming Royal Identity Through Architecture, Landscape, and the Built Environment, 550 BCE–642 CE. Oakland: University of California Press. ISBN 9780520379206.
- Cristoforetti, Simone (2000). "Mehragān". Encyclopædia Iranica, online edition. New York: Brill.
- Payne, Richard E. (2015). A State of Mixture: Christians, Zoroastrians, and Iranian Political Culture in Late Antiquity. Univ of California Press. ISBN 978-0-520-29245-1.
- Rose, Jenny (2015). "Festivals and the Calendar". In Stausberg, Michael; Vevaina, Yuhan Sohrab-Dinshaw; Tessmann, Anna (eds.). The Wiley Blackwell Companion to Zoroastrianism. John Wiley And Sons Ltd. pp. 379–393.
- Russell, James R. (1987). Zoroastrianism in Armenia. Harvard University Press. ISBN 978-0674968509.
- Sanders, P.; Chalmeta, P.; Lambton, A.K.S.; Groot, A.H. de & Burton-Page, J. (1991). "Marāsim". In Bosworth, C. E.; van Donzel, E. & Pellat, Ch. (eds.). The Encyclopaedia of Islam, Second Edition. Volume VI: Mahk–Mid. Leiden: E. J. Brill. pp. 518–534. ISBN 978-90-04-08112-3.
- Shaked, Shaul (2015). "Islam". In Stausberg, Michael; Vevaina, Yuhan Sohrab-Dinshaw; Tessmann, Anna (eds.). The Wiley Blackwell Companion to Zoroastrianism. John Wiley And Sons Ltd. pp. 491–499.
