= Apris =

Sanskrit word

Apri (āprī) in Sanskrit means "conciliation, propitiation" and refers to special invocations spoken previous to the offering of oblations in an animal sacrifice. Some scholars have proposed however, that these hymns were originally meant for a family ritual centered around Agni, which was then later connected to the animal sacrifice.

== Aprisuktas ==
Of the ten Aprisuktas mentioned in Gargya Narayana's commentary, I.13 and I.142 both invoke the Narāśaṁsa and Tanūnapāt manifestations of Agni, I.188, III.4, IX.5 and X.110 invoke only the Tanūnapāt manifestation and II.3, V.5, VII.2 and X.70 invoke only the Narāśaṁsa manifestation.

| Āprīsūkta | Ṛṣi |
|---|---|
| 1.13 | Medhātithi Kāṇva |
| 1.142 | Dīrghatamās Aucathya |
| 1.188 | Agastya Maitrāvaruṇi |
| 2.3 | Gṛtsamada Bhārgava Śaunaka, originally Gṛtsamada Āṅgirasa Śaunahotra |
| 3.4 | Viśvāmitra Gāthina |
| 5.5 | Vasuśruta Ātreya |
| 7.2 | Vasiṣṭha Maitrāvaruṇi |
| 9.5 | Asita Kāśyapa or Devala Kāśyapa |
| 10.70 | Sumitra Vādhryaśva |
| 10.110 | Jamadagni Bhārgava or Rāma Jāmadagnya |
