= Mithra =

Zoroastrian divinity of covenant, light, and oath

Mithra Avestan: 𐬨𐬌𐬚𐬭𐬀
- God of Covenant and Light
- Relief from Taq-e Bostan in Kermanshah Iran. In this relief, Ardashir II is in the middle and to his right is Shapur II and to the left of the king, the god Mithra, with beams of light like the sun emanating from his head in all directions, and he is standing on a sacred lotus flower.
- Affiliation: The Thirty-Three Deities, Guardians of the Days of the Month, The Twelve Deities
- Abode: Hara Berezaiti
- Symbol: Sunlight, light, Lion, Cypress tree
- Sacred flower: Scarlet Rose
- Attributes: God of the Covenant, God of Light and Brightness, God of War, God of Truth, Guardian of the Covenant, Judge of Deeds on the Final Day
- Day: 16th of each month in the Iranian calendar، Sunday of each week
- Mount: Chariot
- Gender: Male
- Temples: Mithraeum
- Festivals: Mehregan, Yalda Night (Birth of Mithra)
- Associated deities: Bahram, Rashn, Soroush, Burz Yazad, Azar, Chista, Haoma

Equivalents
- Hindu: Mitra
- Roman: Mithras
- Armenian: Mihr
- Babylonian: Shamash
- Ossetian: Uastyrdzhi
- Yazidi: Sheikh Shems

Mithra (Avestan: 𐬨𐬌𐬚𐬭𐬀, Miθra; Old Persian: 𐎷𐎰𐎼, Miθraʰ; Middle Persian: 𐭬𐭲𐭥, Mihr) is an ancient Iranian deity (yazata) of covenants, light, oaths, justice, the Sun, contracts, and friendship. In addition to being the divinity of contracts, Mithra is also a judicial figure, an all-seeing protector of Truth (Asha), and the guardian of cattle, the harvest, and the Waters.

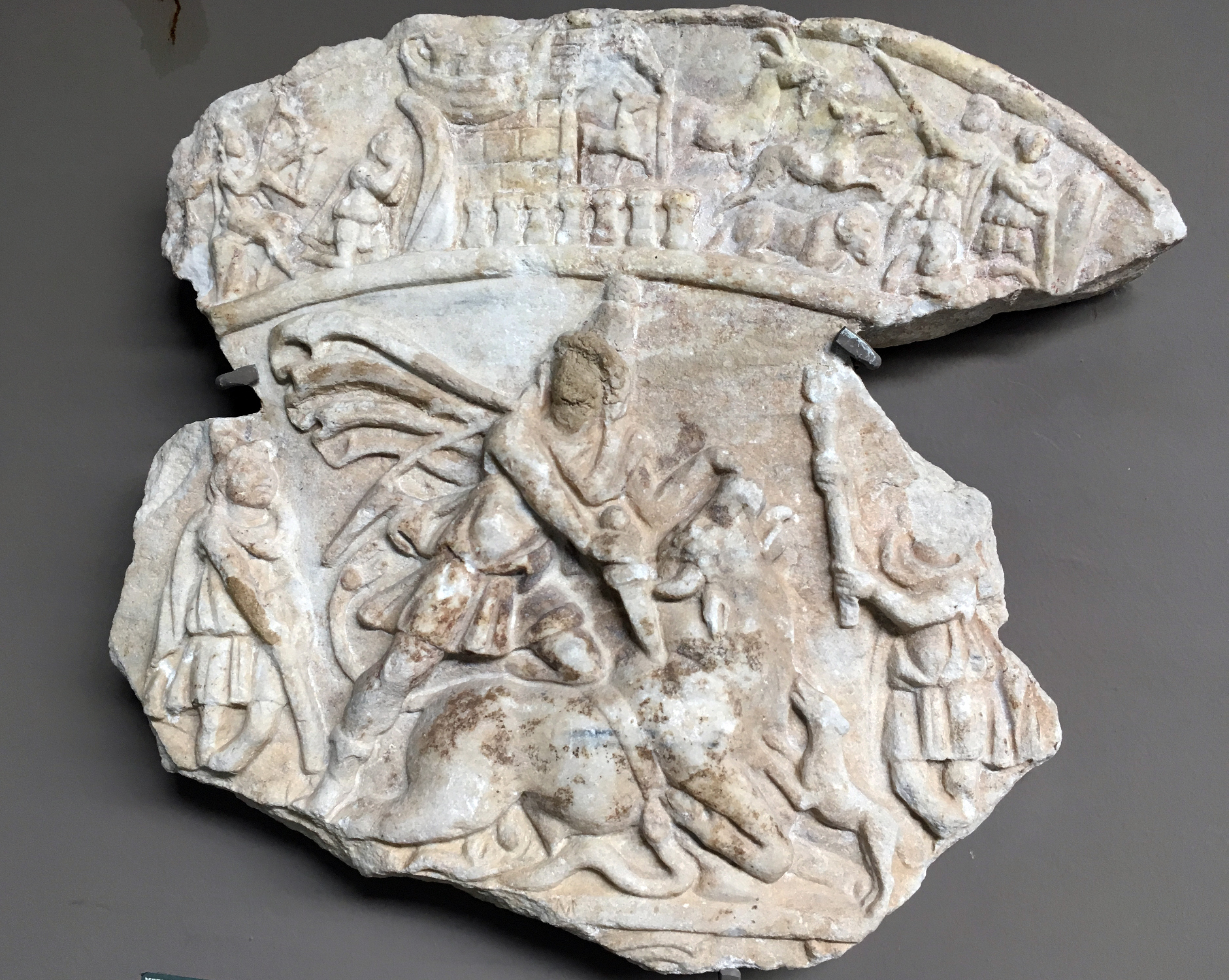
A marble relief of the tauroctony in later Roman Mithraism, 2nd – 3rd century CE

The Romans attributed their Mithraic mysteries to Zoroastrian Persian sources relating to Mithra. Since the early 1970s, the dominant scholarship has noted dissimilarities between the Persian and Roman traditions, making it, at most, the result of Roman perceptions of Zoroastrian ideas. Several characteristics of the later Roman Mithras are present in the Avesta. The tenth book of Yashts shows the deity's close connections with the social and cosmic order, the securing of fertility and water supply, the connection to the sun, and the ethical conditions imposed on the faithful. These four important themes appear in a different, but recognizable form in the Roman cult. According to Boyce, the earliest literary references to the Mithraic mysteries are by the Latin poet Statius, about 80 CE, and Plutarch (c. 100 CE).

4486 Mithra, a near-Earth asteroid, is named after Mithra.

== Etymology ==
Together with the Vedic common noun mitra, the Avestan common noun miθra derives from Proto-Indo-Iranian *mitrám (Mitra), from the root *mi- "to bind", with the "tool suffix" -tra- "causing to". Thus, etymologically mitra/miθra means "that which causes binding", preserved in the Avestan word for "Covenant, Contract, Oath".

In Middle Iranian languages (Middle Persian, Parthian, etc.), miθra became 𐭬𐭲𐭥 mihr, from which New Persian مهر mehr and Armenian Միհր Mihr and Մհեր Mher ultimately derive.

== In the Avesta ==
As a member of the Iranian ahuric triad, along with Ahura Mazda and Ahura Berezant (Apam Napat), Mithra is an exalted figure. As the god of contract, Mithra is incapable of being deceived, infallible, eternally watchful, and never-resting. Mithra is additionally the protector of cattle, and his stock epithet is "of Wide Pastures." He is guardian of the waters and ensures that those pastures receive enough of it.

=== In the Yasna ===
Mithra is described in the Zoroastrian Avesta scriptures as "Mithra of Wide Pastures, of the Thousand Ears, and of the Myriad Eyes," (Yasna 1:3), "the Lofty, and the Everlasting... the Province Ruler," (Yasna 1:11), "the Yazad (Divinity) of the Spoken Name" (Yasna 3:5), and "the Holy," (Yasna 3:13).

Like most other divinities, Mithra is not mentioned by name in the Gathas, the oldest texts of Zoroastrianism and traditionally attributed to Zoroaster himself, or by name in the Yasna Haptanghaiti, a seven-verse section of the Yasna liturgy that is linguistically as old as the Gathas. The lack of Mithra's presence in the Gathas was once a cause of some consternation amongst Iranians. An often repeated speculation of the first half of the 20th century was that the lack of any mention (i.e., Zoroaster's silence) of Mithra in these texts implied that Zoroaster had rejected Mithra. This ex silentio speculation is no longer followed. Building on that speculation was another series of speculations, which postulated that the reason why Zoroaster did not mention Mithra was that the latter was the supreme God of a bloodthirsty group of daeva-worshipers that Zoroaster condemned. However, "no satisfactory evidence has yet been adduced to show that, before Zoroaster, the concept of a supreme god existed among the Iranians, or that among them Mithra – or any other divinity – ever enjoyed a separate cult of his or her own outside either their ancient or their Zoroastrian pantheons."

=== In the Khorda Avesta ===
==== In the Khwarshed Niyayesh ====
The Khorda Avesta (Book of Common Prayer) also refer to Mithra in the Litany to the Sun, "Homage to Mithra of Wide Cattle Pastures," (Khwarshed Niyayesh 5), "Whose Word is True, who is of the Assembly, Who has a Thousand Ears, the Well-Shaped One, Who has Ten Thousand Eyes, the Exalted One, Who has Wide Knowledge, the Helpful One, Who Sleeps Not, the Ever Wakeful. We sacrifice to Mithra, The Lord of all countries, Whom Ahura Mazda created the most glorious, Of the Supernatural Yazads. So may there come to us for Aid, Both Mithra and Ahura, the Two Exalted Ones," (Khwarshed Niyayesh 6-7), "I shall sacrifice to his mace, well-aimed against the Skulls of the Daevas" (Khwarshed Niyayesh 15). Some recent theories have claimed Mithra represents the Sun itself, but the Khorda Avesta refers to the Sun as a separate entity – as it does with the Moon, with which the Sun has "the Best of Friendships," (Khwarshed Niyayesh 15).

==== In the Mihr Yasht ====
The Avestan Hymn to Mithra (Yasht 10) is the longest, and one of the best-preserved, of the Yashts. It begins with the command of the supreme god of Zoroastrianism, Ahura Mazda, that Mithra be venerated as much as himself, as the god who guarantees contracts, and then develops the different aspects of this god in the form of praises and prayers. Mithra is described in the Mihr Yasht, the Middle Persian term for the tenth book of the Yashts, as a powerful god and one of the Ahuras (lords). The god is also described there as "the strict guardian of the contract, patron of warriors, master of the entirety of the Iranian countries, inciter of the dawn, and god of the diurnal heaven, which he travels through in a chariot surrounded by an escort of attendants".

Mithra bestows wonderful blessings and brings disasters upon those who break contracts, fight against their contractual partners, and are not bound by oaths. Whether Mithra is angry or peaceful, he remains a benefactor of humankind, who, in turn, cannot live in peace without a love of truth. Mithra constantly observes and oversees everything that exists between heaven and earth. He embodies a sacred concept that is essential for a society in daily life. He is a deity for men of authority: the master of the house, the head of the village, the tribal leader, and the ruler of the land. He has a solar aspect, which seems just as ancient as his role as guarantor of contracts. He is, however, not the Sun itself (that is the god Hvare-khshaeta). Mithra is mentioned as the bringer of rain. He increases the waters and makes plants grow with the rain. Mithra is also charged with propagating the Zoroastrian religion.

Mithra reaches Hara Berezaiti and looks over the abode of the Aryans, "We sacrifice unto Mithra, the lord of wide pastures, .... sleepless, and ever awake; who first of the heavenly gods reaches over the Hara, before the undying, swift-horsed sun; who, foremost in a golden array, takes hold of the beautiful summits, and from thence looks over the abode of the Aryans with a beneficent eye." (Mihr Yasht 12-13). His dwelling on the Hara Berezaiti was built by Ahura Mazda, "We sacrifice unto Mithra, the lord of wide pastures, .... sleepless, and ever awake; for whom the Maker, Ahura Mazda, has built up a dwelling on the Hara Berezaiti, the bright mountain around which the many (stars) revolve, where come neither night nor darkness, no cold wind and no hot wind, no deathful sickness, no uncleanness made by the Daevas, and the clouds cannot reach up unto the Haraiti Bareza;" (Mihr Yasht 49-50). He is worshipped on the Hara Berezaiti by Haoma, "We sacrifice unto Mithra, the lord of wide pastures, .... sleepless, and ever awake; to whom the enlivening, healing, fair, lordly, golden-eyed Haoma offered up a sacrifice on the highest of the heights, on the Haraiti Bareza, he the undefiled to one undefiled, with undefiled baresma, undefiled libations, and undefiled words;" (Mihr Yasht 88).

His weapon is a club and the daevas flee at the sight of Mithra's club, "Swinging in his hands a club with a hundred knots, a hundred edges, that rushes forwards and fells men down; a club cast out of red brass, of strong, golden brass; the strongest of all weapons, the most victorious of all weapons; from whom Angra Mainyu, who is all death, flees away in fear; from whom Aeshma, the evil-doing Peshotanu, flees away in fear; from whom the long-handed Bushyasta flees away in fear; from whom all the Daevas unseen and the Varenya fiends flee away in fear." (Mihr Yasht 96-97).

==== In the Frawardin Yasht ====
Alongside Apam Napat, Mithra maintains order in society, "There will Mithra, the lord of wide pastures, increase all the excellences of our countries, and allay their troubles; there will the powerful Apam-Napat increase all the excellences of our countries, and allay their troubles." (Frawardin Yasht 95).

== In other texts ==
Mithra is mentioned in post-Sasanian Pahlavi Zoroastrian literature, such as the Bundahishn and the Revayats. These texts state that the great god Ahura Mazda created him to be the most important being worthy of veneration (yazata). He is charged with watching over the world and humankind on behalf of the creator god, traveling the world to spread kindness and friendship, and protecting lost souls from injustice.

In the apocalyptic Zand-i Wahman yasn (7.19-20), Mithra—together with Nairyosangha, Arshtat, Rashnu, Verethragna, Sraosha and a personified Khvarenah—assists the hero Peshotanu. In the fight, Mithra intervenes on Peshotanu’s side in the struggle against the daevas, who have exceeded their term of rule by 1,000 years, and defeats the daeva Aeshma, whereupon Aeshma and his followers flee back to Duzakh.

Late Zoroastrian text, the Mēnōg ī xrad (2.118), says at the entrance of the Chinvat bridge, the "Bridge of Judgement" that all souls must cross, there is a tribunal, over which Mithra presides in the company of Sraosha "Obedience" and Rashnu "Justice". Unlike Sraosha, however, Mithra is not a psychopomp, a guide of souls to the place of the dead. Should the good thoughts, words, and deeds outweigh the bad, Sraosha alone conveys the soul across the bridge.

== In tradition ==
In Zoroastrian scripture, Mithra is distinct from the divinity of the Sun, Hvare-khshaeta (literally "Radiant Sun", from which the Middle Persian word Khorshed for the Sun). However, in Zoroastrian tradition, Mithra evolved from being an all-seeing figure (hence vaguely associated with the Sun) into a divinity co-identified with the Sun itself, effectively taking over Hvare-khshaeta's role. It is uncertain how and when and why this occurred, but it is commonly attributed to conflation with the Babylonian sun god Shamash and/or the Greek deity Apollo, with whom Mithra shares multiple characteristics such as a judicial function and association with the Sun. This characteristic is part of Mithra's Indo-Iranian inheritance in that the Indic Rigveda has solar divinities that are not distinct from Mithra, who is associated with sunrise in the Atharvaveda. Om Mitraya Namaha is a Hindu mantra chanted in the practice of Sun Salutation, wherein Mitra is a name of the god of the Sun, Surya.

In the Zoroastrian calendar, the sixteenth day of the month and the seventh month of the year are dedicated to and are under the protection of Mithra. The Iranian civil calendar of 1925 adopted Zoroastrian month-names, and as such also has the seventh month of the year named "Mihr". The position of the sixteenth day and seventh month reflects Mithra's rank in the hierarchy of the Divinities; the sixteenth day and seventh month are respectively the first day of the second half of the month and the first month of the second half of the year. The day on which the day-name and month-name dedications intersect is (like all other such intersections) dedicated to the divinity of that day/month, and is celebrated with a Jashan (from Avestan Yasna, "Worship") in honor of that Divinity. In the case of Mithra, this was Jashan-e Mehregan, or just Mehregan for short.

== In classical accounts ==
According to Plutarch, Mithra occupies the middle ground between Ahura Mazda and Angra Mainyu, and is therefore called the mediator. De Jong offers an original translation of this passage: "That is why the Persians call the mediator Mithra," referring to the Pahlavi migāncīg ("mediary"), an epithet of Mithra. The same function of mediation with Druj is attributed to Sraosha in the Yashts. According to Benveniste, it originally belonged to Mithra.

Herodotus describes Mithra as a goddess, and equates "her" with Alilat of the Arabs, Aphrodite of the Greeks, and Mylitta of the Assyrians. Mylitta is Mullissu, the wife of Ashur. He writes: "... from the Assyrians and Arabs the Persians learned to worship Urania (the Assyrians call Aphrodite Mylitta, the Arabs Alilat, and the Persians Mithra)." E. A. Grantovsky, following V. V. Struve, sees in the message an indication of the androgynous essence of Mithra. Strabo corrects Herodotus' data, indicating that the Persians call Helios, that is, the sun, Mithra.

In the pseudo-Clementines Mithra is identified with Apollo. In the Xanthos inscription Apollo is also called xšaθrapati (an epithet of Mithra).

Dionysius the Areopagite, discussing the day of the Sun's standing still during the reign of Hezekiah, the king of Judea, mentioned in the Bible, refers to the Persian sacred stories and celebrations that the Magi perform to Mithra.

Lucian mentions a golden statue of Mithra, and Nonnus notes the veneration of Mithra in Bactria and Babylon.

== Mythology ==
=== Birth of Mithra ===
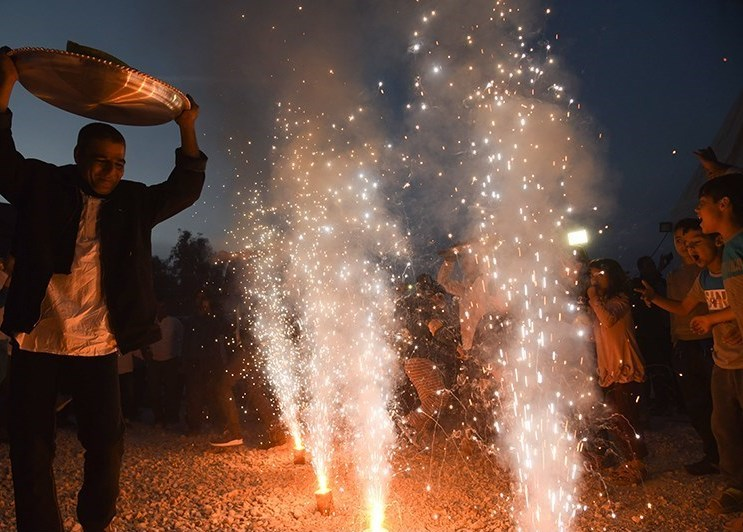
2017 Yalda Night celebration at Sarpol-e Zahab

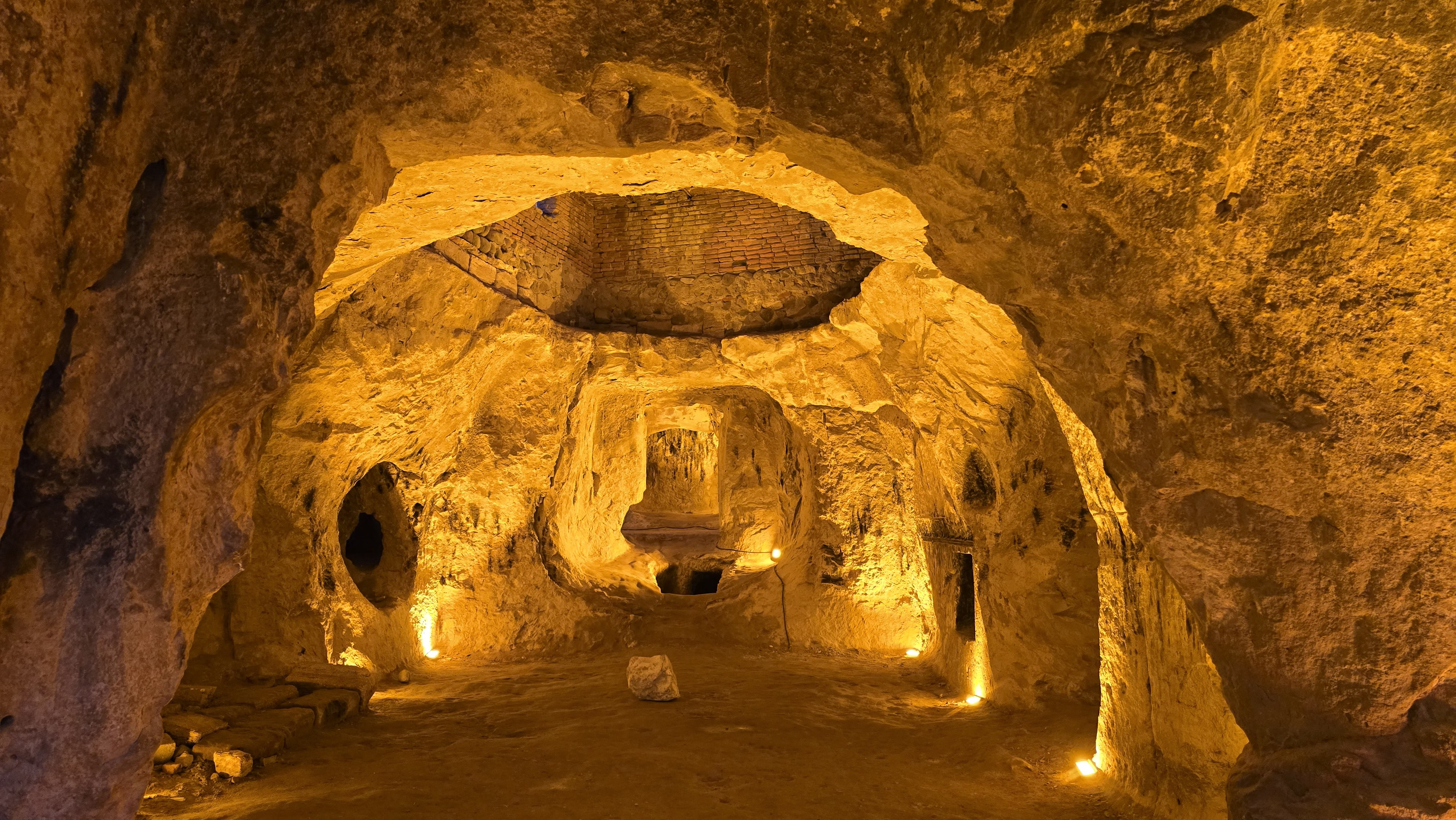
Mithra Temple of Maragheh an underground rock-cut sanctuary in Iran, near Varjovi village, built during the Parthian era for the worship of Mithra.

The birth of Mithra is an astronomical event that occurs one night a year, and that is Yalda Night, which has a history of several millennia in Iran. According to ancient Iranian beliefs, Mithra was born from the heart of a rock on the night of the winter solstice, the longest night of the year, in the darkest cave. Shepherds were the first people to find him. From ancient times to the present day, Iranians celebrate the night of the winter solstice and wait for the sunrise. From this time Mithra overcomes darkness and the days gradually become longer and the nights shorter. The birth of Mithra was a symbol of light, hope, and the renewal of nature.

According to another myth, Mithra was born from lightning on the heights of the Alborz mountains. The sanctity of mountains and caves is present in most ancient beliefs. Hence, the tradition of praising Mithra on top of mountains appeared in natural mountain caves. This tradition spread even in Rome in its oriental form, which is why, as far as possible, the initiation ceremony into the Mithraic cult was performed in natural caves and otherwise in cave-like temples resembling natural caves.

=== Connection with the sun ===
Mithra is very close to the sun, but as stated in the Avesta, Mithra is not the sun god, but its light and rays, and its fundamental duty is to give light and life. The myth states that after his birth, this god decided to test his strength. Therefore, he first tested his strength with the sun, and in this task, the sun could not withstand Mithra's strength and fell to the ground. Then Mithra helped him to get up and extended his right hand towards him, and the two gods shook hands. This was a sign that the sun pledged allegiance to Mithra. Then Mithra placed a crown on the sun's head, and from then on the two became loyal companions. It is also said that Mithra, who was born from a rock, went to war with the sun and after winning it, rode the sun's chariot, which is known as the swastika, to the sky, and since then the two have been considered one and the same god. The connection between the two is such that Mithra has become the sun's rays and lights.

== History ==
=== Median period ===
It has been suggested that Mithra was the great god of the Medes, an Iranian-speaking people who ruled a powerful kingdom in the first half of the 6th century BC, but this remains highly speculative in the absence of sources on the Median pantheon.

=== Achaemenid period ===
Although there is no known Mithraic iconography in the Achaemenid period, the deity is invoked in several royal Achaemenid inscriptions:

1. In Artaxerxes II's (r. 404 – 358 B.C.) trilingual (Old Persian, Elamite, and Babylonian) inscription at Susa (A^{2}Sa) and Hamadan (A^{2}Hc), which have the same text, the emperor appeals to "Ahuramazda, Anahita, and Mithra protect me against all evil," and beseeches them to protect what he has built. Although the Behistun inscription of Darius I (r. 522 – 486 B.C.) invokes Ahura Mazda and "the Other Gods who are", this inscription of Artaxerxes II is remarkable as no Achaemenid king before him had invoked any but Ahura Mazda alone by name. Boyce suggests that the reason for this was that Artaxerxes II had chosen Mithra and Anahita as his patron/protector Divinities. The reign of Artaxerxes II saw a revival of the cult of Mithra and Anahita and even set up statues of his gods.
2. Mithra is invoked again in the single known inscription of Artaxerxes III, A^{3}Pa, found at Persepolis. In that inscription, that emperor appeals to "Ahuramazda and the God Mithra preserve me, my country, and what has been built by me."

No reference to Mithra has been found in the Persepolis Administrative Archives. However, M. Schwartz gives a translation by R.T. Hallock "'... the priest received and utilized [16 marris of wine] for Ahura Mazda and the god Mithra and S(h)imut', the latter an Elamite god" further providing "the supplier and priest bear Iranian names."

The presence of Mithra is found in the names of people he helped to shape (Theophoric name), attested by various sources from the Achaemenid period, particularly among the Persian ruling elite; thus, in papyri unearthed at Elephantine in Upper Egypt (5th century BC) are found Mithra-dāta (Mithridates), “(child) given by Mithra” and Mithra-yazna, “he who sacrifices to/worships Mithra”. It is also possible that the cult of Mithra was introduced into Egypt during this period, or shortly thereafter, since two Greek papyri dated to the 3rd century BC apparently mention temples of Mithra (Mithraion). But this point is debated.

It has been suggested that the great Zoroastrian festival dedicated to Mithra, the Mehregan, took place as early as this period, but the arguments in this direction are limited, notably the mention of a festival called Mithrakāna during the Achaemenid period by Strabo, who wrote several centuries later. The month called Bāga-yādi, the month of "sacrifice to the god," appearing in the Persepolis Administrative Archives, may be that of the great festival of Mithra.

In Xenophon's Oeconomicus, Cyrus the Younger swears by Mithra, as does the Persian commander Artabazus. According to Curtius, Darius III invoked the sun, Mithra, and the sacred fire before the Battle of Gaugamela. In Plutarch's version, Darius III swears by "the great light of Mithras".

=== Seleucid period ===
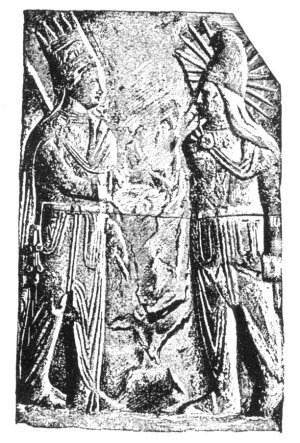
Mithras-Helios (right), with solar rays and in Iranian dress, with Antiochus I of Commagene (Mt. Nemrut, 1st century BCE)

The Seleucid kings repeatedly associated themselves with the image of the solar god Helios, which in their eastern possessions may reflect a desire to appropriate the image of local solar deities, including Mithra, and the legitimacy this conferred on the rulers in the eyes of their non-Greek subjects.

=== Parthian period ===
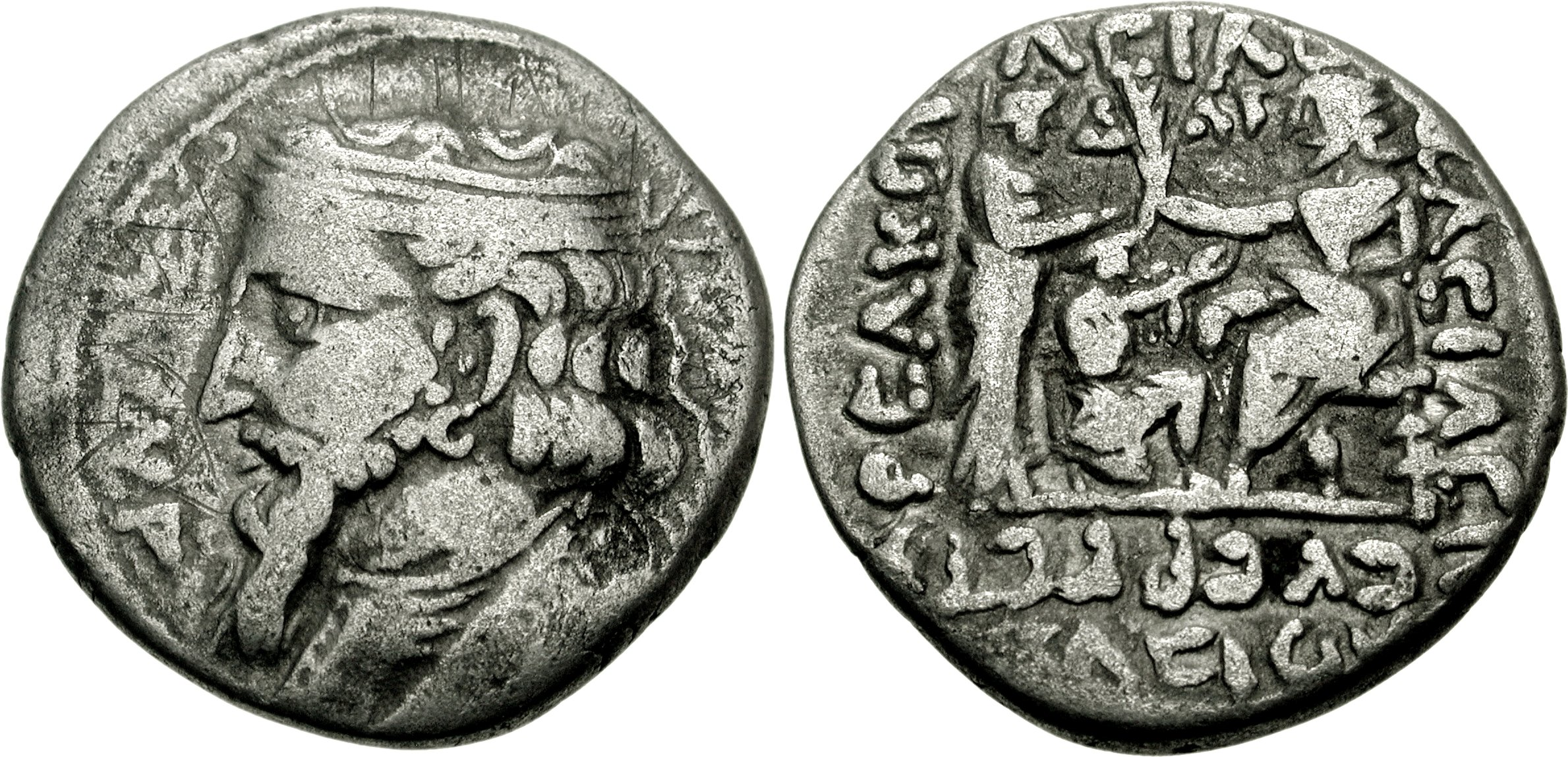
Coin of Artabanus II of Parthia (c. 128–124 BC). The Hellenistic depiction on the reverse shows the king kneeling before an Apollo-like god, which is thought to be Mithra.

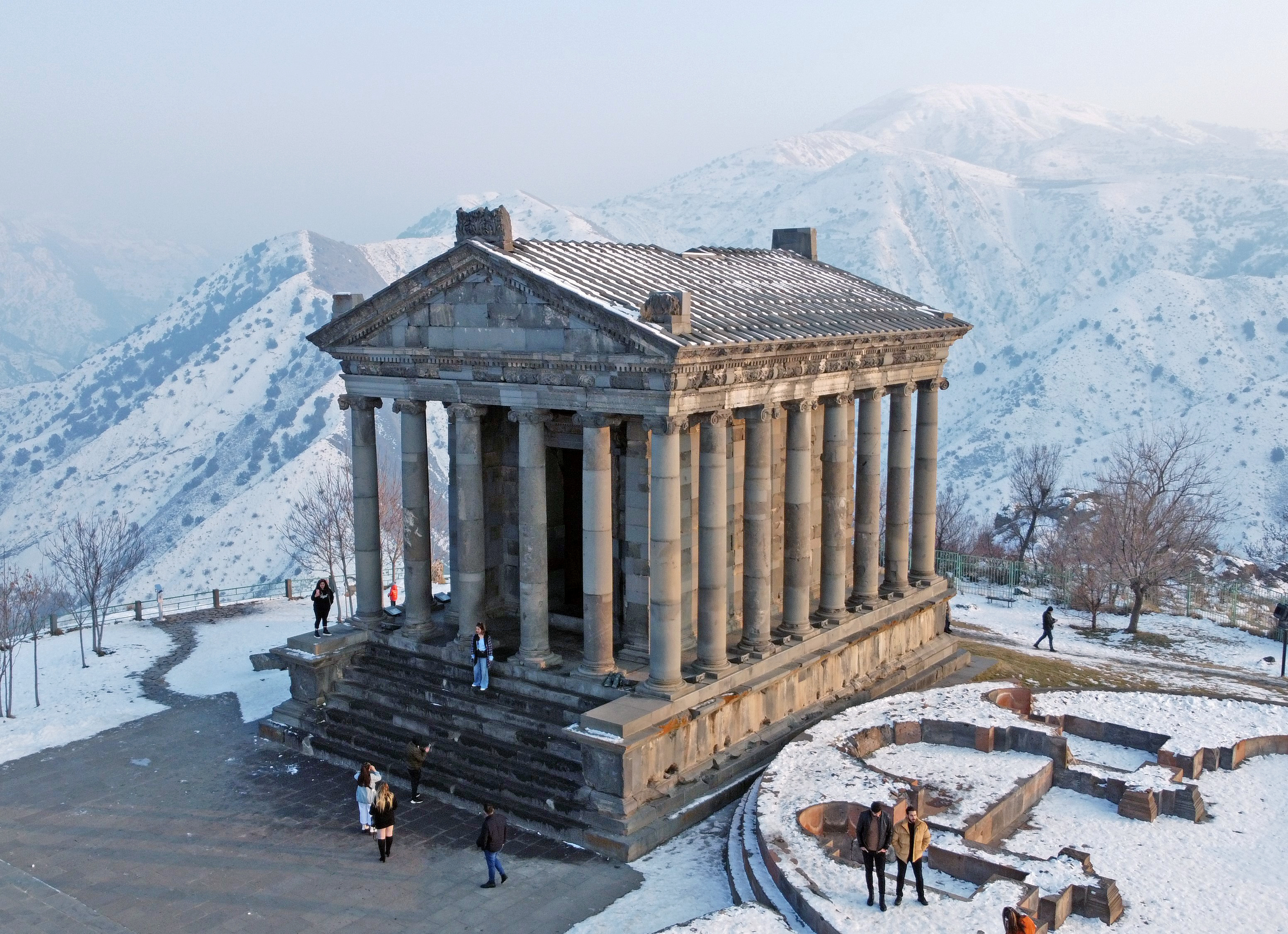
Garni Temple in 2021

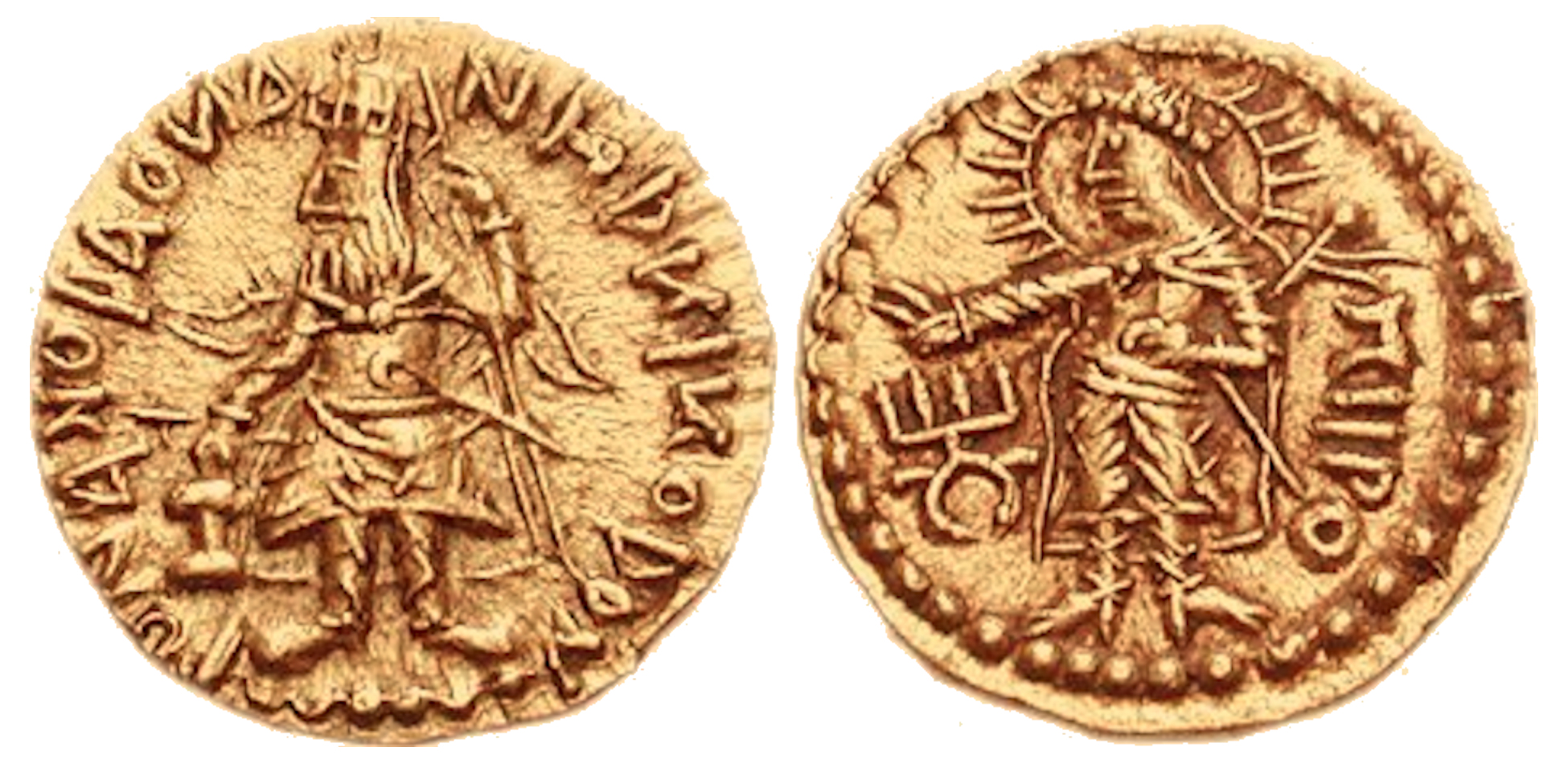
Coinage of Kushan ruler Kanishka I with Miiro (Μιιρο), "Mithra". c. 120–150 CE

The cult of Mithra is poorly documented in this context, but it was clearly present and important in the Parthian Empire.

In official iconography of the Parthian period, Mithra would take on the features of Apollo, on a coin from Susa that seems to represent him, dating from the reign of Artabanus II (12-38/40 AD). Before him is a kneeling Parthian king. This scene is echoed in a speech by King Tiridates I of Armenia, a descendant of the Arsacids, to the Roman emperor Nero, narrated by Cassius Dio, in which the Armenian king mentions the fact that as a member of his dynasty he usually prostrated himself only before Mithra (and that he was prepared to make the exception of bowing before the Roman emperor). The Garni Temple in Armenia, probably erected by this same king, is often presented as a sanctuary of Mithra. The youthful Apollonian-type Mithra is also found in images from other countries of Iranian culture in the Parthian period, such as Commagene in the Roman-Parthian border and the Kushan Empire on the Indo-Iranian border.

The popularity of the god in the Parthian Empire is also demonstrated by the presence of numerous personal names composed of the name Mithra in administrative excavations discovered at the site of ancient Nisa, Turkmenistan. Several Parthian kings bore the name Mithridates, derived from that of the god, indicating the important place the god held in the official pantheon of the Arsacid dynasty, possibly with the status of tutelary deity. The name Mithridates is also borne by numerous Anatolian rulers, from dynasties of Iranian origin in Pontus (including the famous Mithridates VI), Commagene, Armenia, and Iberia, indicating that he was still seen in these regions as the guarantor of royal authority.

=== Sasanian period ===
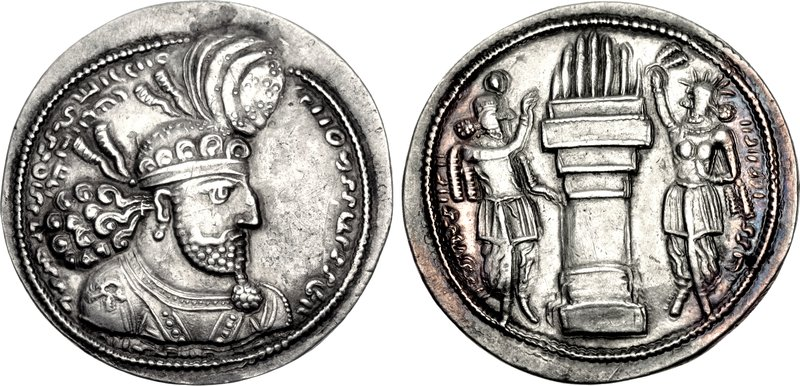
Drachma of Hormizd I

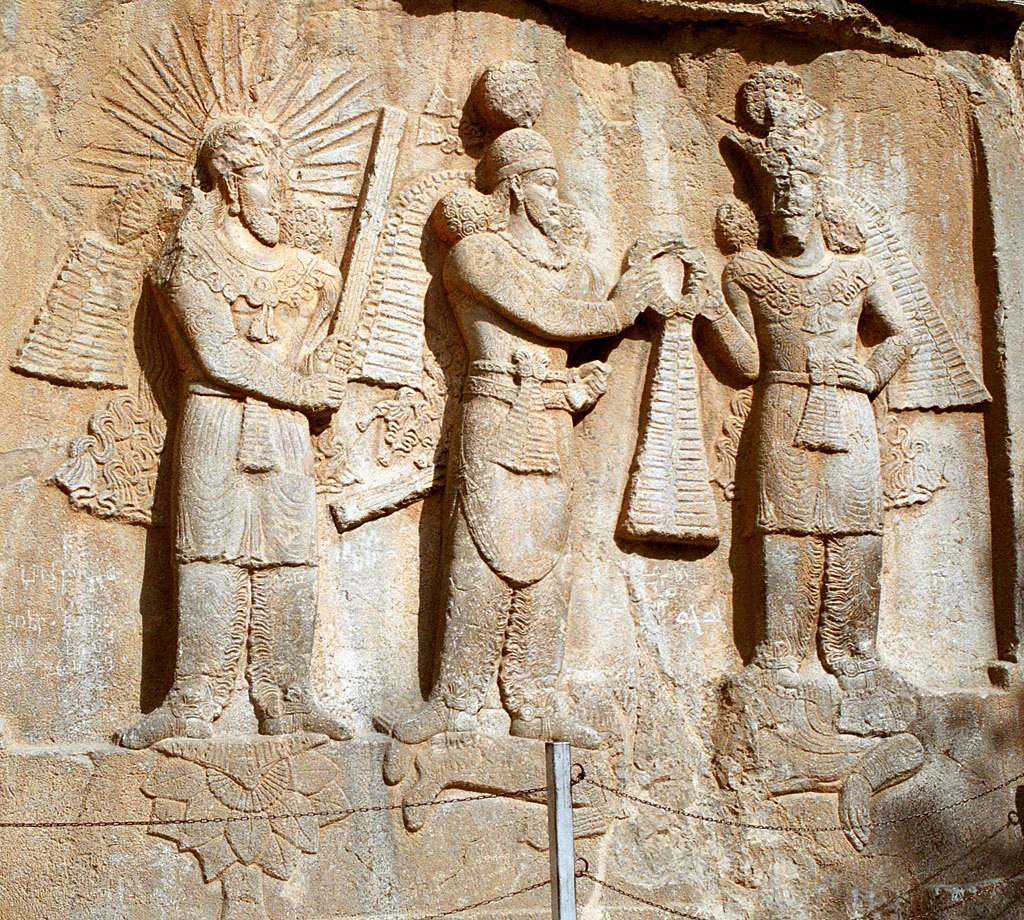
Investiture of Sassanid emperor Ardashir II (3rd century CE) bas-relief at Taq-e Bostan, Iran. On the left stands the yazata Mithra with raised barsom, sanctifying the investiture.

In late antiquity, Mithra (Middle Persian: Mihr) was one of the important gods in the Sasanian Empire, alongside Ahura Mazda and Anahita. The great festival of Mithra, Mehregan, was one of the most important in the Empire, alongside the New Year festival (Nowruz).

Mithra was apparently regarded as a divine protector of the Kushano-Sasanian rulers and gave them their power.

The only ruler to have him depicted on coins was Hormizd I (272-273 CE). The reverse of Hormizd I's coin portrayed two attendants, the attendants face the temple and are wearing different crowns. The figure on the left side represents Hormizd I, whilst the figure on the right—depending on its portrayal—represents the Iranian deities Mithra or Anahita.

The best-known representation of Mithra from this period is a rock-carved bas-relief from Taq-e Bostan, depicting a bearded and radiant Mithra on a lotus symbolizing divine splendor (Khvarenah), holding a ritual bundle of sticks (barsom), attending a scene of the investiture of Ardashir II (379-383 CE). It is thought that the rule of Ardashir II was further legitimized by the god who guaranteed the security of treaties.

The god also appears on some seals of the period in his solar aspect. The inscriptions on the seals of the Sasanian period attest to the fact that names formed from that of the god remained common.

=== Umayyad period ===
A marriage contract from Samarkand, dated 710 CE, invokes Mithra in his ancestral role as guarantor of the social bond.

=== Present-day Zoroastrianism ===
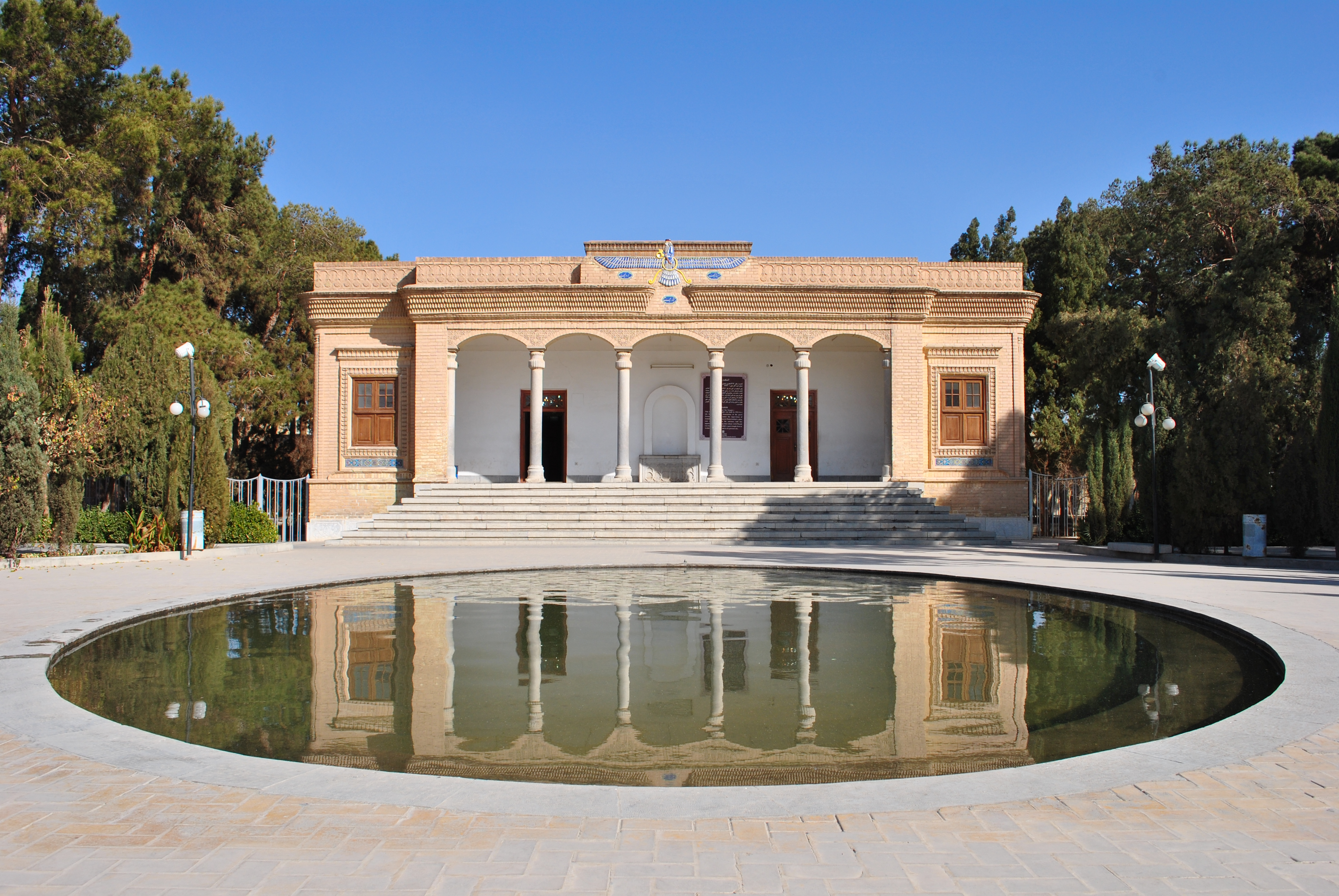
Fire Temple of Yazd in Iran

In contemporary Zoroastrianism, Mithra remains seen as the ultimate guarantor of justice; he continues to be venerated through ancient Avestan hymns and prayers, celebrated with great pomp during his annual festival Mehregan, and throughout the rest of the year in chapels dedicated to him. Mehregan is generally held in the autumn (earlier in the Yazd region). Traditionally, the local Zoroastrian community gathers for a celebration that includes a ceremonially slaughtered and roasted sheep or lamb, but this practice has tended to become less common since the mid-20th century, as it is perceived as inconsistent with religious principles.

In the Revayats and Parsi texts in Gujarati, the expression Dar-e Mehr appears, meaning "gate/court of Mithra," and is used to designate the fire temple, a Zoroastrian place of worship. Today, it is known as Dar be-mehr. This etymology has not received a consensus explanation. Etymological theories see a derivation from mithryana (Meillet) or *mithradana (Gershevitch) or mithraion (Wilcken). It has been proposed that the term is a throwback to the age of the shrine cults, the name being retained because all major Zoroastrian rituals were solemnized between sunrise and noon, the time of day especially under Mithra's protection.

== Identification with Zeus ==
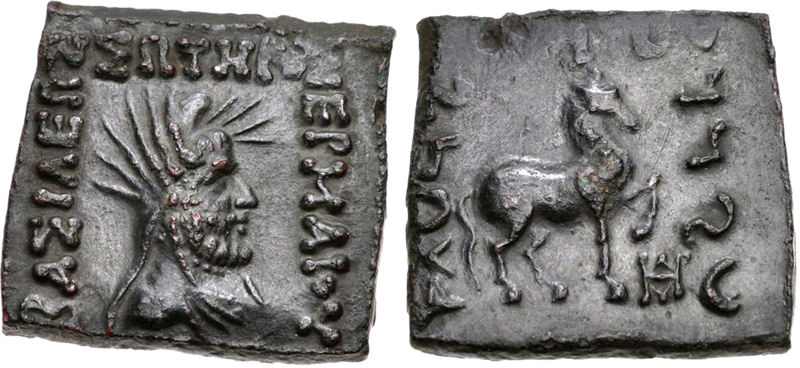
Coin of King Hermaios depicting on the obverse (front) the head of Zeus-Mithras, in profile and radiate.

In Hellenistic Bactria (Greco-Bactrian kingdom, c. 246-130 BC), Mithra seems to have been more assimilated to Zeus than to Helios or Apollo, which refers to his role as guarantor of kingship. The largest sanctuary in the city of Ai-Khanoum, the main site excavated for Hellenistic Bactria, could be dedicated to this Zeus-Mithras.

With the coin issues of Heliocles I (c. 145-130 BC) appears a bearded god, resembling Zeus, with sunbeams radiating from his head, which seems to attest to this syncretism between the Greek god and the local solar deity, namely Mithra. This figure is found again on issues of later kings, linked to the "Indo-Greek" sphere, who dominated Kapissa, Amyntas, and Hermaios (c. 95-70 BC). The fact that Mithra is identified with Zeus in these regions could confirm his role as supreme deity (whereas further west the assimilation occurs with Ahura Mazda).

Subsequently, the Kushano-Sasanian kings also featured Mithra, again in the guise of the bearded Zeus, named Miuro in one of the earliest issues of the dynasty.

== In Manichaeism ==
Persian and Parthian-speaking Manichaeans used the name of Mithra current in their time (Mihryazd, q.e. Mithra-yazata) for two different Manichaean angels.

1. The first, called Mihryazd by the Persians, was the "Living Spirit" (Aramaic rūḥā ḥayyā), a savior-figure who rescues the "First Man" from the demonic Darkness into which he had plunged.
2. The second, known as Mihr or Mihr Yazd among the Parthians, is the "Messenger" (Aramaic īzgaddā), likewise a savior figure, but one concerned with setting up the structures to liberate the Light lost when the First Man had been defeated.

The second figure mentioned above, the Third Messenger, was the helper and redeemer of mankind, and identified with another Zoroastrian divinity, Narisaf (derived from Pahlavi Narsēh from Avestan Nairyō.saȵhō, meaning 'Potent Utterance', the name of a Yazata). Citing Boyce, Sundermann remarks, "It was among the Parthian Manicheans that Mithra as a Sun God surpassed the importance of Narisaf as the common Iranian image of the Third Messenger; among the Parthians the dominance of Mithra was such that his identification with the Third Messenger led to cultic emphasis on the Mithraic traits in the Manichaean God."

Unrelated to these Mihrs are Parthian and Sogdian Mytr or Mytrg. Although sharing linguistic roots with the name Mithra, Werner Sundermann established that those names denote Manicheanism’s equivalent of Maitreya.

== See also ==
- List of solar deities
- Maitreya
- Mithraic reliefs of Jort
- Mitra
- Varuna
- Verethragna

== Works cited ==
- Boyce, Mary (1969), "On Mithra's Part in Zoroastrianism", Bulletin of the School of Oriental and African Studies, 32 (1): 10–34, doi:10.1017/S0041977X00093678.
- Boyce, Mary (2001), "Mithra the King and Varuna the Master", Festschrift für Helmut Humbach zum 80., Trier: WWT, pp. 239–257.
- Bricault, Laurent; Roy, Philippe (2021). Les cultes de Mithra dans l'Empire romain (in French). Toulouse: Presses universitaires du Midi.
- Curtis, Vesta Sarkhosh; Stewart, Sarah (2008). The Sasanian Era. I.B.Tauris. pp. 1–200. ISBN 978-0-85771-972-0.
- Gnoli, Gerardo (1987), "Aštād", Encyclopaedia Iranica, vol. 2, New York: Routledge & Kegan Paul.
- Grenet, Frantz (2001). "Mithra dieu iranien : nouvelles données". Topoi. Orient-Occident (in French). 11 (1). Société des amis de la Bibliothèque Salomon Reinach: 35–58. doi:10.3406/topoi.2001.1927.
- Grenet, Franz (2006). "Mithra ii. Iconography in Iran and Central Asia". Encyclopædia Iranica.
- Lecoq, Pierre (2016). Les livres de l'Avesta: Textes sacrés des Zoroastriens (in French). Paris: Le Cerf. p. 415-462.
- Martinez-Sève, Laurianne (2010). "Pouvoir et religion dans la Bactriane hellénistique: Recherches sur la politique religieuse des rois séleucides et gréco-bactriens". Chiron (40): 9–10.
- Schindel, Nikolaus (2013). "Sasanian Coinage". In Potts, Daniel T. (ed.). The Oxford Handbook of Ancient Iran. Oxford University Press. ISBN 978-0-19-973330-9.
- Schmidt, Hans-Peter (2006), "Mithra I: Mithra in Old Indian and Mithra in Old Iranian", Encyclopaedia Iranica, vol. OT 10, New York: iranica.com.
