= Mah =

Zoroastrian deity

- God of Moon; Guardian of Plants and Livestock
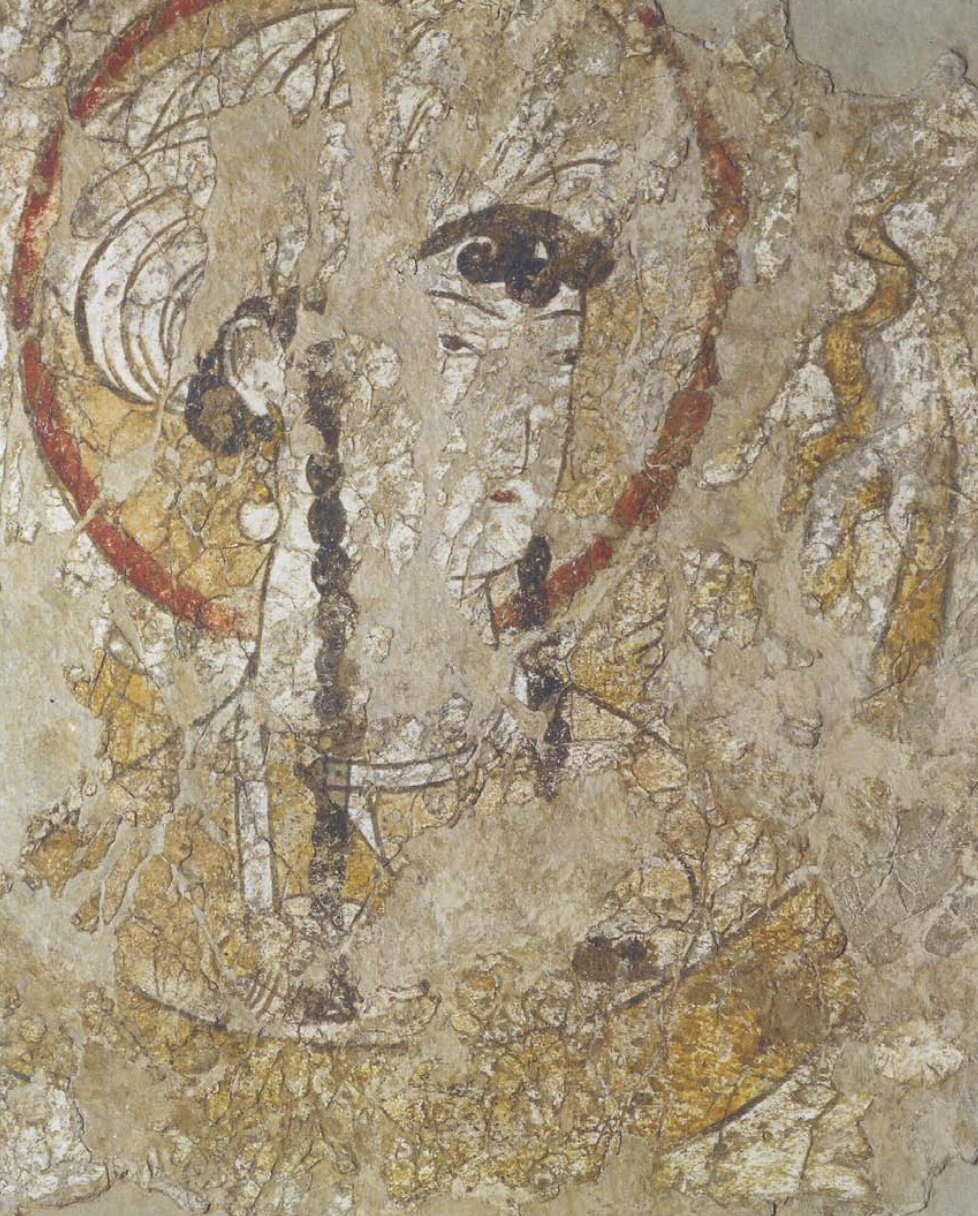
- Mah depicted as a beardless feminine figure on a Panjakent wall painting, late 7th or early 8th century
- Other names: Chāndra
- Avestan: Mångha 𐬨𐬂𐬢𐬵𐬀
- Affiliation: The Thirty-Three Deities, Guardians of the Days of the Month
- Abode: Sky
- Planet: Moon
- Symbol: Moon, Cow (due to the resemblance of its horns to the crescent moon)
- Sacred flower: Narcissus
- Attributes: Increase of the flock of sheep, Lush vegetation and Prosperity, Care for the stars, Life-Giving and Honorable
- Day: 12th of each month in the Iranian calendar, Monday of each week
- Gender: male
- Festivals: Māh Ruz
- Associated deities: Vohu Manah, Rama, Drvaspa

Equivalents
- Greek: Artemis
- Roman: Diana
- Indian: Soma

Mångha (Avestan: 𐬨𐬂𐬢𐬵𐬀 måŋha) is the Avestan for "Moon, month", equivalent to Persian Māh (ماه; Old Persian 𐎶𐎠𐏃 māha). It is the name of the lunar deity in Zoroastrianism. The Iranian word is masculine. Although Mah is not a prominent deity in the Avestan scripture, his crescent was an important symbol of royalty throughout the Parthian and Sassanid periods.

The Iranian word is cognate with the English moon, from PIE *mēns.

== Avesta ==
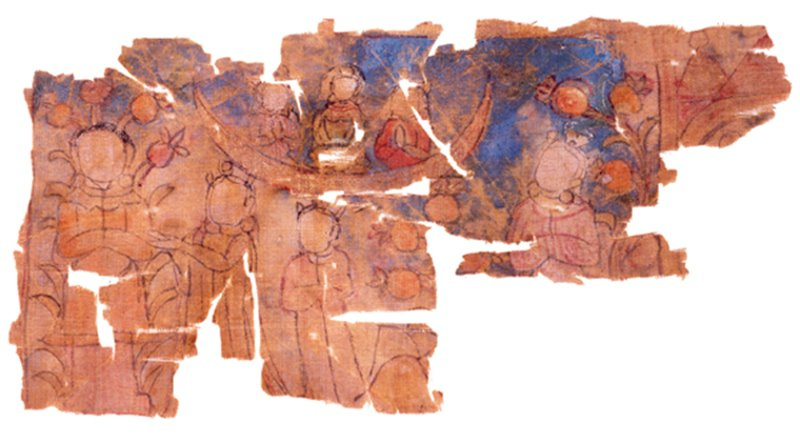
Painting of the Earth and Moon God in Manichaeism

Although there are two Avestan hymns dedicated to the Moon, he is not a prominent divinity. In both the third Nyaish as well as in the seventh Yasht, the 'moon' more commonly spoken of is the physical moon. In these hymns, the phases of the moon are described at length. Ahura Mazda is described to be the cause of the moon's waxing and waning, and the Amesha Spentas evenly distribute the light of the moon over the earth. The Fravashis are said to be responsible for keeping the moon and stars on its appointed course. The sun, moon, and stars revolve around the peak of Hara Berezaiti.

The Moon is however also "bestower, radiant, glorious, possessed of water, possessed of warmth, possessed of knowledge, wealth, riches, discernment, weal, verdure, good, and the healing one". "During the spring, the Moon causes plants to grow up out of the earth".

The Moon is repeatedly spoken of as possessing the cithra (Note: The precise meaning of the word cithra in this context is unknown. It is traditionally translated as "seed", which in the sense of "prototype" carries the connotation of a particular physical form or appearance. It can also mean "seed" in the sense of "race", "stock", or progeny.) of the primeval bull. This is an allusion to a cosmological drama that is however only properly attested in the texts of Zoroastrian tradition (see below).

== In tradition ==
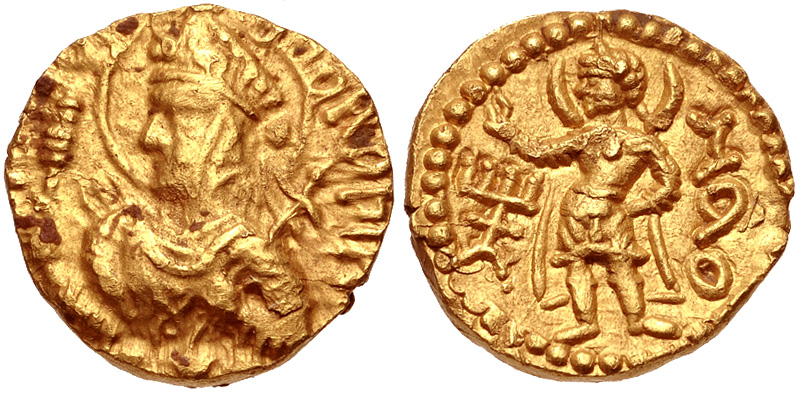
Coinage of Kushan ruler Huvishka, with the Lunar deity Mah (Mao) on the reverse, 2nd century CE. The lunar crescent appears behind the shoulders.

Herodotus states that the moon was the tutelary divinity of the Iranian expatriates residing in Asia Minor. The divinity Mah appears together with Mithra on Kushan coins.

In the Zoroastrian calendar, the twelfth day of the month is dedicated to and is under the protection of the Moon.

The Moon plays a prominent role in Zoroastrian cosmogony, in particular as described in detail in the Bundahishn, a text finished in the 12th century. The legend runs as follows: Ahriman (Av: Angra Mainyu) incites Jeh the primeval whore to kill the primordial bovine Gawiewdad (Av. Gavaevodata). Jeh does as told, but as the creature lies dying, the chihr is rescued and placed in the care of the moon. This chihr is then the "prototype" (karb) of all creatures of the animal world.

In the hierarchy of yazatas, the Moon is the assistant (or 'cooperator', hamkar) of Vohu Manah (MP: Bahman), the Amesha Spenta of animal welfare, in particular of cattle. The identification with Vohu Manah - the hypostasis of "Good Purpose" or "Good Mind" - is reflected in other texts where the moon is associated with mental harmony and inner peace. (Note: Mah is also the Persian language name of a species of fish, which gives rise to the Persian language expression, az mah ta mahi, "from the moon to the mah-fish", to mean "everything". That expression has its origin in Persian mythology, where the world is believed to sit on a rock, on the back of a bull, on a kamkam, on the back of the mah fish, on water, on wind, and on the veil of darkness. cf. The Rubaiyat, Omar Khayyam,: Whose secret Presence, through Creation's veins Running, Quicksilver-like eludes your pains: Taking all shapes from Mah to Mahi; and They change and perish all – but He remains;)

== See also ==
- Men (deity)
