= Comparative religion =

Systematic comparison of the world's religions

Various religious symbols representing the world's largest religions (from left to right): 1st row: Christianity, Judaism, Hinduism; 2nd row: Islam, Buddhism, Shinto; 3rd row: Sikhism, the Baháʼí Faith, Jainism

Comparative religion is the branch of religious studies that systematically compares the doctrines, practices, themes and impacts (including migration) of the world's religions. In general, the comparative study of religion yields a deeper understanding of the fundamental philosophical concerns of religion such as ethics, metaphysics and the nature and forms of salvation. It also considers and compares the origins and similarities shared between the various religions of the world. Studying such material facilitates a broadened and more sophisticated understanding of human beliefs and practices regarding the sacred, numinous, spiritual and divine.

In the field of comparative religion, a common geographical classification of the main world religions distinguishes groups such as Middle Eastern religions (including Abrahamic religions and Iranian religions), Indian religions, East Asian religions, African religions, American religions, Oceanic religions, and classical Hellenistic religions.

There also exist various sociological classifications of religious movements.

== History ==
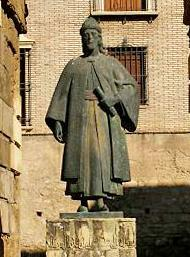
A statue of Ibn Hazm, father of modern comparative religious studies, in Córdoba Spain.

Al-Biruni (973 – c. 1050) and Ibn Hazm (994 – 1064), both of the Islamic Golden Age and considered the "fathers of comparative religion", compared the study of religious pluralism, and their works have been significant in the fields of theology and philosophy. Al-Biruni discussed his idea of history in The Remaining Signs of Past Centuries (c. 1000 AD) which was translated by Eduard Sachau in the 19th century. It is a comparative study of calendars of different cultures and civilizations, interlaced with mathematical, astronomical, and historical information, exploring the customs and religions of different peoples.

In the seventeenth century, antiquarians such as Athanasius Kircher along with Sir Thomas Browne were pioneering scholars of comparative religion. In 1655, Dara Shikoh authored the Majma-ul-Bahrain a Sufi, text on comparative religion.

Social scientists in the 19th century took a strong interest in comparative and "primitive" religion through the work of Max Müller, Edward Burnett Tylor, William Robertson Smith, James George Frazer, Émile Durkheim, Max Weber, and Rudolf Otto. Nicholas de Lange, Professor of Hebrew and Jewish Studies at Cambridge University, says that

The comparative study of religions is an academic discipline which has been developed within Christian theology faculties, and it has a tendency to force widely differing phenomena into a kind of strait-jacket cut to a Christian pattern. The problem is not only that other 'religions' may have little or nothing to say about questions which are of burning importance for Christianity, but that they may not even see themselves as religions in precisely the same way in which Christianity sees itself as a religion.

Examples that demonstrate this point are Buddhism and Chinese Folk Religions. These belief systems have not historically been seen as mutually exclusive and have blended over time into different beliefs such as Pure Land Buddhism. This shows a marked difference from Western conceptions of religions, which see adherence to one religion as precluding membership of another faith.

Hinduism and Buddhism provide another insight in the form of soteriology. Comparative study of religions may approach religions with a base idea of salvation with eternal life after death, but religions like Hinduism or Buddhism don't necessarily share this view. Instead, Hinduism and Theravada Buddhism both speak of a falling back into nonexistence and escaping the cycle of reincarnation, rather than eternal life after death.

== Geographical classification ==
According to Charles Joseph Adams, in the field of comparative religion, a common geographical classification discerns the main world religions as follows:

1. Middle Eastern religions, including Christianity, Islam, Judaism, Zoroastrianism, and a variety of ancient belief systems;
2. East Asian religions, the religious communities of China, Japan, Korea and Vietnam, and consisting of Confucianism, Taoism, the various schools of Mahayana ("Greater Vehicle") Buddhism, and Shintō;
3. Indian religions, including early Buddhism, Hinduism, Jainism, Sikhism, and sometimes also the Theravada ("Way of the Elders") Buddhism and the Hindu- and Buddhist-inspired religions of South and Southeast Asia;
4. African religions, the ancient belief systems of the various indigenous peoples of Africa, excluding ancient Egyptian religion, which is considered to belong to the ancient Middle East;
5. American religions, the beliefs and practices of the various Indigenous peoples of the two American continents;
6. Oceanic religions, the religious systems of the peoples of the Pacific islands, Australia, and New Zealand; and
7. Religions of ancient Greece and Rome and their Hellenistic descendants.

=== Middle Eastern religions ===
==== Abrahamic or Western Asian religions ====
In the study of comparative religion, the category of Abrahamic religions includes the three monotheistic religions, Christianity, Islam and Judaism, which claim Abraham (Hebrew Avraham אַבְרָהָם; Arabic Ibrahim إبراهيم ) as a part of their sacred history. Smaller religions such as the Baháʼí Faith that fit this description are sometimes included but are often omitted.

The original belief in the God of Abraham eventually became strictly monotheistic present-day Rabbinic Judaism. Religious Jews regard Judaism as the expression of the covenant that God established with the Children of Israel. Jews hold that the Torah forms part of the larger text known as the Tanakh or the Hebrew Bible. They also look to a supplemental oral tradition represented by later texts such as the Midrash and the Talmud.

Christians believe that Christianity represents the fulfillment and continuation of the Jewish Old Testament. Christians believe that Jesus (Hebrew Yeshua יֵשׁוּעַ) is the awaited Messiah (Christ) foretold in the Old Testament prophecies, and also honor the subsequently produced New Testament scriptures. Generally, Christians believe that Jesus is both the incarnation of God and the Son of God. Their creeds generally hold in common that the incarnation, ministry, suffering, death on the cross, and resurrection of Jesus took place for the salvation of mankind.

Islam teaches that the present Christian and Jewish scriptures have been corrupted over time and are no longer the original divine revelations as given to the Jewish people and to Moses, Jesus, and other prophets. For Muslims, the Quran is the final, complete revelation from God (Arabic الله Allah); they believe it to have been revealed to Muhammad alone, whom they characterise as the final prophet of Islam and as the Khatam an-Nabiyyin, meaning the last of the prophets ever sent by Allah ("seal of the prophets").

Based on the Muslim figure of the Mahdī, the ultimate savior of humankind and the final Imām of the Twelve Imams, Ali Muhammad Shirazi, later known as "the Báb", created the Bábí movement out of the belief that he was the gate to the Twelfth Imām. This signaled a break with Islam and started a new religious system, Bábism. However, in the 1860s a split occurred, after which the vast majority of Bábís who considered Mirza Husayn `Ali or Bahá'u'lláh to be the Báb's spiritual successor founded the Baháʼí Movement, while the minority who followed Subh-i-Azal came to be called Azalis. The Baháʼí division eventually became a full-fledged religion in its own right, the Baháʼí Faith. In comparison to the other Abrahamic religions - Judaism, Christianity and Islam - the number of adherents for Baháʼí faith and other minor Abrahamic religions are not very numerous.

Out of the three major Abrahamic faiths, Christianity and Judaism are the two religions that diverge the most in theology and practice.

The historical interaction between Islam and Judaism started in the 7th century CE with the origin and spread of Islam. There are many common aspects between Islam and Judaism, and as Islam developed, it gradually became the major religion closest to Judaism. In contrast to Christianity, which originated from interaction between ancient Greek, Roman, and Hebrew cultures, Judaism is very similar to Islam in its fundamental religious outlook, structure, jurisprudence and practice. There are many traditions within Islam that originate from traditions which are recorded in the Hebrew Bible or which stem from post-biblical Jewish traditions. These practices are known collectively as the Isra'iliyat.

The historical interaction between Christianity and Islam connects fundamental ideas in Christianity with similar ones in Islam. Islam accepts many aspects of Christianity as part of its faith – with some differences in interpretation – and rejects other aspects; for example, it simplifies complex Christian Christological teaching and completely avoids the potential pitfalls of Trinitarianism. Islam holds that the Quran is the final revelation from God and a completion of all previous revelations, including the Bible.

Mandaeism, sometimes also known as Sabianism (after the mysterious Sabians mentioned in the Quran, a name historically claimed by several religious groups), is a Gnostic and monotheistic religion. John the Baptist is their chief prophet, and frequent baptism is part of their core practices. According to most scholars, Mandaeism originated sometime in the first three centuries CE, either in southwestern Mesopotamia or in the Syro-Palestinian area. However, some scholars take the view that Mandaeism is older and dates from pre-Christian times. Mandaeans assert that their religion predates Judaism, Christianity, and Islam as a monotheistic faith. Mandaeans believe that they descend directly from Shem, Noah's son, and also from John the Baptist's original disciples.

==== Iranian religions ====
Several important religions and religious movements originated in Greater Iran, that is, among speakers of various Iranian languages. They include Ætsæg Din, Manichaeism, Mazdakism, Mithraism, Ahl-e Haqq, Yazdanism, Zoroastrianism, and Zurvanism.

Depiction of the Faravahar, a popular symbol for Zoroastrianism

Perhaps one of the most important religions that originated in Iran was Zoroastrianism. While not, properly speaking, a world religion, it became widespread in the Iranian cultural sphere, especially through the Achaemenid and Sasanian Empires. It went into decline alongside many Iranian religions with the rise of Islam and the establishment of Caliphates. The religion still survives today in small numbers, with a particularly notable example being the Parsis in India and Pakistan.

Scholars have often noted the similarities between Zoroastrianism and the Abrahamic religions, especially Christianity. They've particularly noted this due to the historic relationship between the Jews and the Zoroastrian Persian Empires, as well as the relationship between Greek philosophy, Persia, and Christianity. They've debated whether Zoroastrianism played an influential role in shaping these religions.

Key areas of concern include a shared sense of duality between the forces of good and evil, or light and darkness. In addition to this, there is a shared belief in the resurrection of the dead as well as an emphasis on free will and the moral responsibility of mankind. These are seen by some as having influenced the three major Abrahamic faiths as well as Gnosticism and the Baháʼí Faith.

Manichaeism is another Iranian faith that shares many similarities with Zoroastrianism. Notably, Manichaeism shares a belief in the prophethood of Zoroaster while also acknowledging the prophethood of Gautama Buddha and Jesus Christ. It shares a dualist cosmology that pits good and light against evil and darkness, with an adversary to oppose the benevolent God. Furthermore, Manichaeism and Mandaeism also share a common belief in many of the figures and stories of the Abrahamic faiths, which has raised questions of influences and origins.

=== Indian religions ===
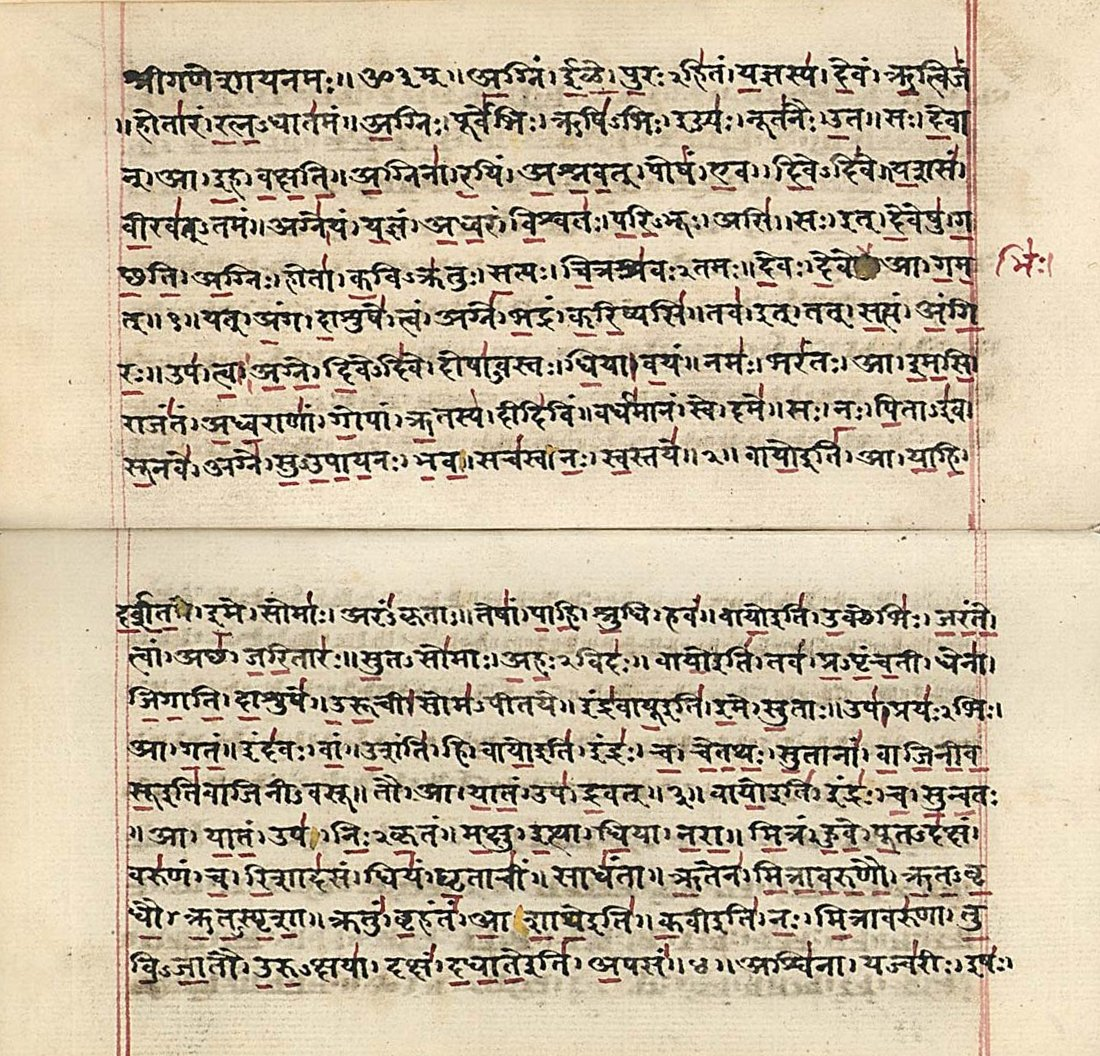
The Rig Veda is one of the oldest Vedic texts. Shown here is a Rig Veda manuscript in Devanagari, early nineteenth century.

In comparative religion, Indian religions refer to all the faiths that originated in South Asia. It is believed that "the kinship of the religions of India stems from the fact that Jains, Buddhists, and Sikhs look back to Hinduism as their common mother."

Al-Biruni deeply studied the Vedic religions, and through his works essential details about pre-11th century Indian religions and cultures emerged. Adi Shankaracharya was an early 8th century philosopher and theologian who consolidated the doctrine of Advaita Vedanta. (Note: Modern scholarship places Shankara in the earlier part of the 8th century CE (c. 700–750). Earlier generations of scholars proposed 788–820 CE. Other proposals are 686–718 CE, 44 BCE, or as early as 509–477 BCE.) Gautama Buddha is mentioned as an Avatar of Vishnu in the Puranic texts of Hinduism. Most Hindus believe the Buddha accepted and incorporated many tenets of Hinduism in his doctrine. Prominent modern Hindu reformers such as Mahatma Gandhi and Vivekananda acknowledge Buddhist influence. Like Hindus, Gandhi himself did not believe Buddha established a non-Hindu tradition. He writes, "I do not regard Jainism or Buddhism as separate from Hinduism."

=== East Asian religions ===
The Chinese character depicting Ru, the central concept in Confucianism

A East Asian religion refers to a distinct group of religions that developed within a pluralistic society where Confucianism which emphasizes ritual propriety li and ancestor worship, coexisted with Mahayana Buddhism, which centers on Dharma.

Unlike the Indian Buddhist cultural sphere where Dharma held a dominant influence, East Asia possessed its own traditional philosophy in Confucianism. At times, the Confucian practice of ancestor worship led to the state sponsorship of the indigenous polytheistic religions of various East Asian peoples, as seen with Taoism during the Tang and Ming dynasties, and Shinto in Japan. Through this sponsorship, Taoism and Shintoism grew organically into indigenous polytheistic religions.

Occasionally, East Asian religions are referred to as "Taoic religions." This is because adherents of Taoism historically asserted their dominance by continually framing the "Three Teachings", including the Buddhist marga (the path) and the Confucian path as three distinct ways. However, Taoism actually wielded the least influence among the Three Teachings and functioned primarily as a folk belief system that never once achieved the status of a ruling state religion. Therefore, classifying them as "Taoic religions" is inappropriate.

Taoism and Chan Buddhism for centuries had a mutual influence on each other in China, Japan, Korea, and Taiwan. These influences were inherited by Zen Buddhism when Chan Buddhism arrived in Japan and adapted as Zen Buddhism.

Despite the geographical distance that would seemingly preclude any direct influence, some scholars have historically observed similarities between traditional Chinese religious beliefs and Christianity. This was noted by Jesuit missionaries who became known as figurists. Figurists promoted the idea that the ancient Chinese knew the truth of Christian revelation and that many of the figures described in Chinese texts are actually figures and concepts from Christianity. Noted parallels include shared flood myths, similarities between Fuxi and Enoch, as well as parallels between Christ and the sages. There is also a noted similarity between the Tao being "the Way" as well as Christ claiming to be "the Way".

While scholarship rejects this view today, it was a notable view in the history of comparative religion. These beliefs were ultimately opposed and disavowed by the Catholic Church in the 18th century.

The introduction of Nestorian Christianity to China under the Tang dynasty also led to increasing similarities between Chinese Buddhism and Nestorian Christianity. Christians began using Buddhist and Taoist concepts to explain their faith. During this time the Jingjiao documents were created, sometimes called sutras that demonstrated the blending of Christianity with Buddhism. Nestorian Christians and Buddhists formed a monastic tradition that furthered the similarities. This fusion was so pronounced that when Emperor Wuzong of the Tang dynasty began persecuting Buddhists in the 9th century, he claimed Christianity was merely a heresy of Buddhism rather than a distinct religion. This conflation contributed to the collapse of Nestorian Christianity in China during the Buddhist persecutions.

== Comparing traditions ==
Religious ideologies can be systematically understood as having formed many major groups with tens of thousands of subbranches. It is a form of cultural evolution that can be intuitively illustrated through trees depicting historical relationships and the diversification over time of the various traditions. Some of the most successful have been those religions that aligned with empires, kingdoms, or caliphates early in their history (e.g., Christianity, Islam, Hinduism, Buddhism). A few major groups of religion are given below.

=== Baháʼí Faith ===
- Baháʼí Faith and the unity of religion
- Baháʼí Faith and Buddhism
- Baháʼí Faith and Hinduism
- Baháʼí Faith and Zoroastrianism

=== Buddhism ===
- Buddhism and Christianity
- Buddhism and Eastern religions
- Buddhism and Gnosticism
- Buddhism and Hinduism
- Buddhism and Jainism
- Buddhism and Theosophy
- Buddhism and Islam
- Comparison of Buddhism and Christianity

=== Christianity ===
- Christianity and other religions
- Buddhism and Christianity
- Comparison of Buddhism and Christianity
- Christianity and Islam
- Christianity and Judaism
- Christianity and Neopaganism
- Christianity and Paganism
- Christianity and Vodou
- Christianity and Mormonism
- Christianity and Theosophy

=== Confucianism ===
- Confucianism and eastern religions
- Confucianism and western religions

=== Hinduism ===
- Hinduism and other religions
- Baháʼí Faith and Hinduism
- Buddhism and Hinduism
- Hindu–Islamic relations
- Jainism and Hinduism
- Hinduism and Sikhism
- Hinduism and Judaism

=== Islam ===
- Islam and other religions
- Christianity and Islam
- Hindu–Islamic relations
- Islam and Jainism
- Islamic–Jewish relations
- Islam and Sikhism
- Mormonism and Islam

=== Jainism ===
- Buddhism and Jainism
- Islam and Jainism
- Jainism and Sikhism

=== Judaism ===
- Christianity and Judaism
- Islamic–Jewish relations
- Hinduism and Judaism

=== Mormonism ===
- Mormonism and Christianity
- Mormonism and Islam
- Mormonism and Judaism

=== Paganism and Neopaganism ===
- Christianity and Paganism
- Christianity and Neopaganism

=== Sikhism ===
- Hinduism and Sikhism
- Islam and Sikhism
- Jainism and Sikhism

=== Taoism ===
- Taoism and other religions

=== Zoroastrianism ===
- Zoroastrianism and other religions
- Zoroastrianism and Baháʼí Faith

== See also ==
- Comparative mythology
- Comparative theology
- Hierographology
- Human Sacrifice
- Inclusivism
- Institute for Interreligious Dialogue
- Integral theory (Ken Wilber)
- Interfaith
- List of founders of religious traditions
- List of religions
- Panbabylonism
- Parallelomania and parallelophobia
- Parliament of the World's Religions
- Patternism
- Religious pluralism
- Religious universalism
