= Sarva Dharma Sama Bhava =

Hindu concept

Sarva Dharma Sama Bhava is a concept coined by Mahatma Gandhi that embodies the equality of the destination of the paths followed by all religions.

The phrase is attributed to Mahātmā Gāndhi, who first used it in September 1930 in his communications to his followers to quell divisions that had begun to develop between Hindus and Muslims. The concept played a role in Gandhi's movement to unite people belonging to various castes and communities into a huge anti-colonial movement.

The concept is one of the key tenets of secularism in India, which do not separate church and state, but instead is an attempt by the state to embrace all religions. As per Amartya Sen India's pluralism has always been the doctrine of state manifested through its policy of secularism that is based on Upanishads idea of Sarva dharma sama bhav.

Sarva dharma sama bhav is often translated as "All religions are the same" or "All path's lead to the same destination (In a religious sense)", although its literal meaning is closer to "Same feeling towards all religions".

== See also ==
- Comparative religion
- Hindu–Christianity relations
- Hindu–Islamic relations
- Hinduism and Judaism
- Ganga-Jamuni tehzeeb
- Unity in diversity
- Religious syncretism
- Hindutva
- We Are the World
