= Nicolas Siouffi =

Religious scholar, numismatist

Nicolas Siouffi (1829 (Damascus) – 1901 (Baabda)) was a Syrian Christian, and later French citizen and vice-consul at Mosul, remembered for his study of Mandaeism. He is known for works such as Études sur les Soubbas ou les Sabéens.

Mandaeans were known locally in Arabic as Ṣubba, which Siouffi identified with the Sabians, a People of the Book in the Quran. Siouffi claimed to have identified 4000 Sabians in the Mandaean population. This was well received by the theosophist G. R. S. Mead, but received highly critical reviews from scholars, accusing Siouffi of ignorance and his teacher of dishonesty.
