= People of the Book =

Islamic term originally used to refer to Jews and Christians

- Arabic: أهل الكتاب
- Romanization: ahl al-kitāb
- Literal meaning: "People of the Book"

People of the Book, or Ahl al-Kitāb (Arabic: أهل الكتاب), is a classification in Islam for the adherents of those religions that are regarded by Muslims as having received a divine revelation from God, generally in the form of a holy scripture. The classification chiefly refers to pre-Islamic Abrahamic religions. In the Quran, they are identified as the Jews, the Christians, the Sabians, and—according to some interpretations—the Zoroastrians. Beginning in the 8th century, this recognition was extended to other groups, such as the Samaritans (who are closely related to the Jews), and, controversially, Hindus, Buddhists, Jains, and Sikhs, among others. In most applications, "People of the Book" is simply used by Muslims to refer to the followers of Judaism and Christianity, with which Islam shares many values, guidelines, and principles.

Historically, in countries and regions following Islamic law, the religious communities that Muslims recognized as People of the Book were subject to a legal status known as dhimmi, meaning that they had the option to pay a special head tax called jizya in exchange for being granted the privilege to practice their faith and govern their community according to the rules and norms of their own religion. Jizya was levied on all mentally and physically capable adult males from these recognized non-Muslim communities. Practitioners of non-recognized religions were not always granted this privilege, although many later Islamic states, particularly those in the Indian subcontinent, amended their laws to extend the application of dhimmi status beyond the originally designated Jewish and Christian communities.

In the Quran, the term is used in a variety of contexts, from religious polemics to passages emphasizing the community of faith among those who possess scriptures espousing monotheism, as opposed to polytheism or any other form of belief.

The designation of People of the Book is also relevant to Islamic marriages: a Muslim man is only permitted to marry a non-Muslim woman if she is Jewish or Christian, and he must additionally ensure that any children produced with his Jewish or Christian wife/wives are raised in the Muslim faith. Muslim women are not permitted to marry non-Muslim men, even if they are Jewish or Christian. In the case of a Muslim–Christian marriage, which is to be contracted only after permission from the Christian party, the Ashtiname of Muhammad dictates that the Muslim husband is not allowed to prevent his Christian wife from attending church for prayer and worship.

More recently, the term has been reappropriated by some Jews and Christians as a means of self-identification vis-à-vis Muslims.

== In the Quran ==
=== Meaning of the term ===
When used in conjunction with a person, the term ahl identifies the members of that person's household, including their fellow tribespeople, relatives and all those who share a family background with them. However, it may also be used with place names to refer to people living in a certain locality (e.g., ahl al-Madīna in Quran 9:101, 'the people of Medina'), or with more abstract nouns, as in ahl madhhab, 'the people of a certain madhhab or school of thought'.

The word kitāb, meaning 'writing' or 'book', occurs very often in the Quran, generally in the sense of a divine rather than a human activity, which consists in writing down and recording everything that is created. More than just referring to a 'book', it conveys meanings of divine knowledge, divine authority, and divine revelation.

The term ahl al-kitāb, then, refers to those who have been given access to such knowledge and revelation: they are the people to whom God has 'sent down' (see tanzīl) his wisdom by means of a prophet, as an act of divine grace. However, the revelations given to the People of the Book, taking the form of the Torah (al-Tawrāt), the Psalms (al-Zabūr), and the Gospel (al-Injīl), were all partial, and it is precisely by already being familiar with the books (kutub) previously sent down that the People of the Book were expected to be able to recognize Muhammad as a prophet, and the Quran as the final and most complete revelation.

=== Identity ===
Several verses in the Quran are commonly understood as identifying the Jews, the Christians, and the Sabians as People of the Book. Thus, for example Sūrat al-Māʾida 5:68–69, which mentions these groups along with the Muslims ("the believers") as being safe from fear and grief:

[68] Say, ˹O Prophet,˺ “O People of the Book! You have nothing to stand on unless you observe the Torah, the Gospel, and what has been revealed to you from your Lord.” And your Lord’s revelation to you ˹O Prophet˺ will only cause many of them to increase in wickedness and disbelief. So do not grieve for the people who disbelieve. [69] Indeed, the believers, Jews, Sabians and Christians—whoever ˹truly˺ believes in Allah and the Last Day and does good, there will be no fear for them, nor will they grieve.

Sūrat al-Baqara 2:62 is similar to this, but there is also a verse (Sūrat al-Ḥajj 22:17) which lists the same groups in another context, that of how God will judge them on the Day of Resurrection, but now adding two more groups to the list:

Indeed, the believers, Jews, Sabians, Christians, Magi, and the polytheists—Allah will judge between them ˹all˺ on Judgment Day. Surely Allah is a Witness over all things.

The last-named group, "the polytheists" (the mushrikūn, lit. 'those who associate'), are the opposite of the first-named, "the believers" (the Muslims). What is less clear, however, is the status of the groups mentioned in between, who now also include the "Magi" (al-majūs), that is to say, the Zoroastrians (who are named only once in the Quran, in this verse). This was a matter of dispute among medieval Muslim scholars, who questioned whether the Zoroastrians had a clear prophet and scripture, as well as whether their doctrines on the nature of God and creation were in accordance with those of Islam and the other religions recognized as having received a revelation. Ultimately, though, most Islamic jurists granted the Zoroastrians partial status as a People of the Book, while still disagreeing on the extent to which legal privileges, such as intermarriage with Muslims, should be allowed.

=== Usage ===
The Quran emphasizes the community of faith between possessors of monotheistic scriptures, and occasionally pays tribute to the religious and moral virtues of communities that have received earlier revelations, calling on Muhammad to ask them for information. More often, reflecting the refusal of Jews and Christians in Muhammad's environment to accept his message, the Quran stresses their inability to comprehend the message they possess but do not put into practice and to appreciate that Muhammad's teaching fulfills that message.

The People of the Book are mentioned several times in the 98th chapter of the Quran, Sūrat al-Bayyina ('The Clear Proof'):

[1] The disbelievers from the People of the Book and the polytheists were not going to desist from disbelief until the clear proof came to them: [2] a messenger from Allah, reciting scrolls of utmost purity, [3] containing upright commandments. [4] It was not until this clear proof came to the People of the Book that they became divided about his prophethood— [5] even though they were only commanded to worship Allah alone with sincere devotion to Him in all uprightness, establish prayer, and pay alms-tax. That is the upright Way. [6] Indeed, those who disbelieve from the People of the Book and the polytheists will be in the Fire of Hell, to stay there forever. They are the worst of all beings. [7] Indeed, those who believe and do good—they are the best of all beings. [8] Their reward with their Lord will be Gardens of Eternity, under which rivers flow, to stay there for ever and ever. Allah is pleased with them and they are pleased with Him. This is only for those in awe of their Lord.

According to Islamic studies scholar Yvonne Haddad, this short chapter condemns all those who reject the 'clear proof' (bayyina) of the Prophet to the eternal fire of hell, whether they are People of the Book or disbelievers (kuffār).

The People of the Book are also referenced in the jizya verse (Q9:29), which has received varied interpretations.

The Quran permits marriage between Muslim men and women who are People of the Book (Jews and Christians).

== History ==
=== Muhammad's era (610–632) ===
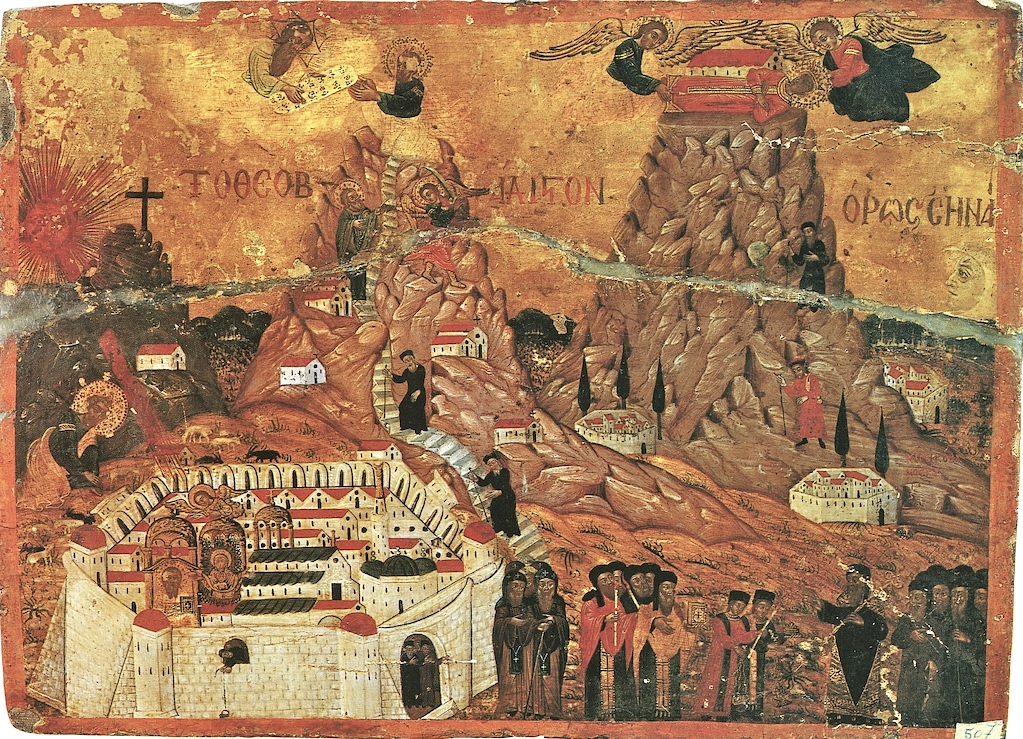
The Ashtiname of Muhammad, a treaty between Muslims and Christians, was purportedly recorded between Muhammad and Saint Catherine's Monastery, which is depicted in this icon.

The Ashtiname of Muhammad, a treaty purportedly made between Muhammad and the Christians of Saint Catherine's Monastery, stated that if a Muslim man wished to marry a Christian woman, marriage could only occur with her consent and she must be permitted to continue attending church to pray and worship. The Ashtiname states that Christians cannot be forced to fight in wars and that Muslims should fight on their behalf; it also states that Christian churches are to be respected and forbids stealing from them. The Ashtiname forbids Muslims to remove Christians from their jobs, including those who serve as judges or monks. Muslims are bound until the Last Judgment to adhere to the treaty or: "he would spoil God's covenant and disobey His Prophet." The policy of the Ottoman Sultans abided by the Ashtiname.

=== Rashidun Caliphate (634–661) ===
During the second caliph Umar's reign (r. 634–642), the Christian community of Najran and the Jewish community of Khaybar were deported to the newly conquered regions of Syria and Iraq. Umar set aside the Christian ban on the Jews and allowed them to pray and reside in Jerusalem. Umar signed a pact with the Christians of Jerusalem, which granted them safety in the region. He also awarded the status of the People of the Book to the Zoroastrians, although some practices contrary to Islam were prohibited.

At the beginning of the Muslim conquest of Mesopotamia in c. 640, the leader of the Mandaeans (one of the religious groups who historically claimed to be the Sabians mentioned in the Quran), Anush bar Danqa, is said to have traveled to Baghdad in order to appear before the Muslim authorities, showing them a copy of the Ginza Rabba (the Mandaean holy book), and proclaiming the chief Mandaean prophet to be John the Baptist (known to Muslims as Yahya ibn Zakariyya). Consequently, the Muslim authorities afforded them the status of People of the Book. However, this account is likely apocryphal, and if it took place at all, it must have occurred after the founding of Baghdad in 762. The earliest source to unambiguously apply the term 'Sabian' to the Mandaeans was al-Hasan ibn Bahlul (fl. 950–1000) citing the Abbasid vizier Abu Ali Muhammad ibn Muqla (c. 885–940). However, it is not clear whether the Mandaeans of this period already identified themselves as Sabians or whether the claim originated with Ibn Muqla.

=== Later Islamic usage ===
When the Umayyad general Muhammad ibn Qasim (c. 694–715) conquered Brahmanabad, he is said to have granted Hindus, Buddhists, and Jains the status of People of the Book.

Islamic scholars differ on whether Hindus are considered People of the Book. The Islamic conquest of India necessitated the definition be revised, as most of India's inhabitants were followers of the Indian religions. Many Muslim clergy in India considered Hindus as people of the book, and from Muhammad bin Qasim in the Umayyad era to the Mughal ruler Aurangzeb in the 17th century, Muslim rulers were willing to consider Hindus as People of the Book.

=== Dhimmi ===
Dhimmi is a historical term referring to the status accorded to People of the Book living in an Islamic state. The word literally means "protected person". According to scholars, dhimmis had their rights fully protected in their communities, but as citizens in the Islamic state, had certain restrictions, and it was obligatory for them to pay the jizya tax, which complemented the zakat, or alms, paid by the Muslim subjects. Dhimmis were excluded from specific duties assigned to Muslims, and did not enjoy certain political rights reserved for Muslims, but were otherwise equal under the laws of property, contract, and obligation.

Under sharia, the dhimmi communities were usually subjected to their own special laws, rather than some of the laws which were applicable only to the Muslim community. For example, the Jewish community in Medina was allowed to have its own Halakhic courts, and the Ottoman millet system allowed its various dhimmi communities to rule themselves under separate legal courts. These courts did not cover cases involving religious groups outside their own community or capital offences. Dhimmi communities were also allowed to engage in certain practices that were usually forbidden for the Muslim community, such as the consumption of alcohol and pork.

Historically, dhimmi status was originally applied to Jews, Christians, and Sabians. This status later also came to be applied to Zoroastrians, Hindus, Jains, and Buddhists. Moderate Muslims generally reject the dhimma system as inappropriate for the age of nation-states and democracies.

== Usage by Jews and Christians ==
In Judaism, the term "People of the Book" (Hebrew: עם הספר, Am HaSefer) has been reappropriated as a term to designate the Jewish people, in reference to the Torah or to the entire Hebrew Bible. Members of some Christian denominations have also embraced the term "People of the Book" in reference to themselves, foremost among them the Puritans as well as the Seventh-day Adventist Church and the Baptists.

== See also ==
- Glossary of Islam
- Outline of Islam
- Abrahamic religions
- Al-Bayyina
- Christianity and Islam
- Divisions of the world in Islam
- Islam and Judaism
- Islam and other religions
- Islamic schools and branches
- Judeo-Christian
- Pact of Umar
