= Comparison of Buddhism and Christianity =

Examination of the influence of Buddhism and Christianity on one another

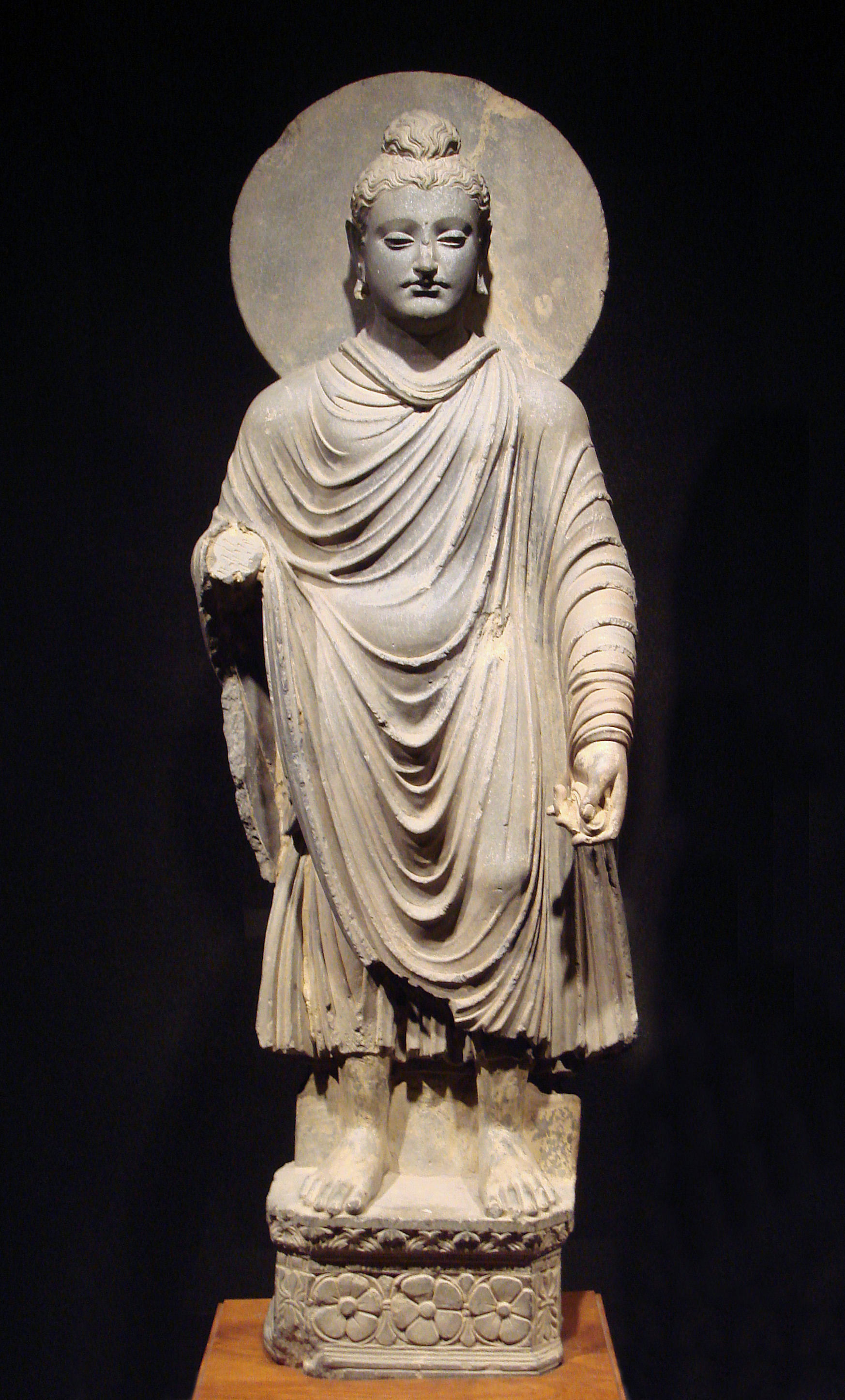
A statue of Siddartha Gautama preaching.

Since the arrival of Christian missionaries in India in the 1st century (traces of Christians in Kerala from 1st-century Saint Thomas Christians), followed by the arrival of Buddhism in Western Europe in the 4th and 5th centuries, similarities have been perceived between the practices of Buddhism and Christianity. During the 20th century, the differences between these two belief systems were also highlighted.

Despite surface level and non-scholarly analogies, Buddhism and Christianity have inherent and fundamental differences at the deepest levels, beginning with monotheism's place at the core of Christianity and Buddhism's orientation towards non-theism and its rejection of the notion of a creator deity, which runs counter to teachings about God in Christianity; and extending to the importance of Grace in Christianity against the rejection of interference with Karma in Theravada Buddhism, etc.

The central iconic imagery of the two traditions underscore the difference in their belief structure, when the death of Gautama Buddha at an old age is contrasted with the image of the crucifixion of Jesus as a willing sacrifice for the atonement for the sins of humanity. Buddhist scholars such as Masao Abe see the centrality of crucifixion in Christianity as an irreconcilable gap between the two belief systems.

Most modern scholarship has rejected the claims for the travels of Jesus to India or Tibet or influences between the teachings of Christianity and Buddhism as not historical, and has seen the attempts at parallel symbolism as cases of parallelomania which exaggerate the importance of trifling resemblances.

== Initial suggestions of similarity ==
Reports of Buddhist practices started to arrive in Western Europe by the 11th century, and were followed by trips by Christian missionaries such as John of Montecorvino, and reports began to arrive in the 16th century as missionaries such as St. Francis Xavier arrived in the East. In the 19th century, some authors began to perceive similarities between Buddhist and Christian practices, e.g. in 1878 T.W. Rhys Davids wrote that the earliest missionaries to Tibet observed that similarities have been seen since the first known contact: "Lamaism with its shaven priests, its bells and rosaries, its images and holy water, its popes and bishops, its abbots and monks of many grades, its processions and feast days, its confessional and purgatory, and its worship of the double Virgin, so strongly resembles Romanism that the first Catholic missionaries thought it must be an imitation by the devil of the religion of Christ." In 1880 Ernest De Bunsen made similar observations in that with the exception of the death of Jesus on the cross, and of the Christian doctrine of atonement, the most ancient Buddhist records resemble the traditions recorded in the Gospels about the life and doctrines of Jesus.

The author of Jesus's Godama Sources claims that Western, or Christian, culture has not even developed the manner of expressions which would allow the very idea of borrowings to be considered. To support this claim the author quotes the admittedly prejudicial speech of Max Muller from his India, What Can it Teach Us, which states: "Our natural inclination would be to suppose that the Buddhist stories borrowed from our Christian sources and not vice versa. But here the conscience of the scholar comes in. Some of these stories are found in the Hinayana Buddhist Canon and date, therefore, before the Christian era."

In 1904 William Crooke suggested that Christian rosaries had originated in India and arrived in Western Europe during the Crusades via its Muslim version, the tasbih. In 1921 Charles Eliot, the British ambassador to Japan also wrote of apparent similarities between Christian practices and their counterparts in Buddhist tradition, and suggested a dependent origin for both traditions. Early in the 20th century Burnett Hillman Streeter suggested that the moral teaching of the Buddha has four resemblances to the Sermon on the Mount.

Late in the 20th century, historian Jerry H. Bentley also wrote of similarities and stated that it is possible "that Buddhism influenced the early development of Christianity" and suggested "attention to many parallels concerning the births, lives, doctrines, and deaths of the Buddha and Jesus". Some high level Buddhists have drawn analogies between Jesus and Buddhism, e.g. in 2001 the Dalai Lama stated that "Jesus Christ also lived previous lives", and added that "So, you see, he reached a high state, either as a Bodhisattva, or an enlightened person, through Buddhist practice or something like that."

== Specific analogies ==
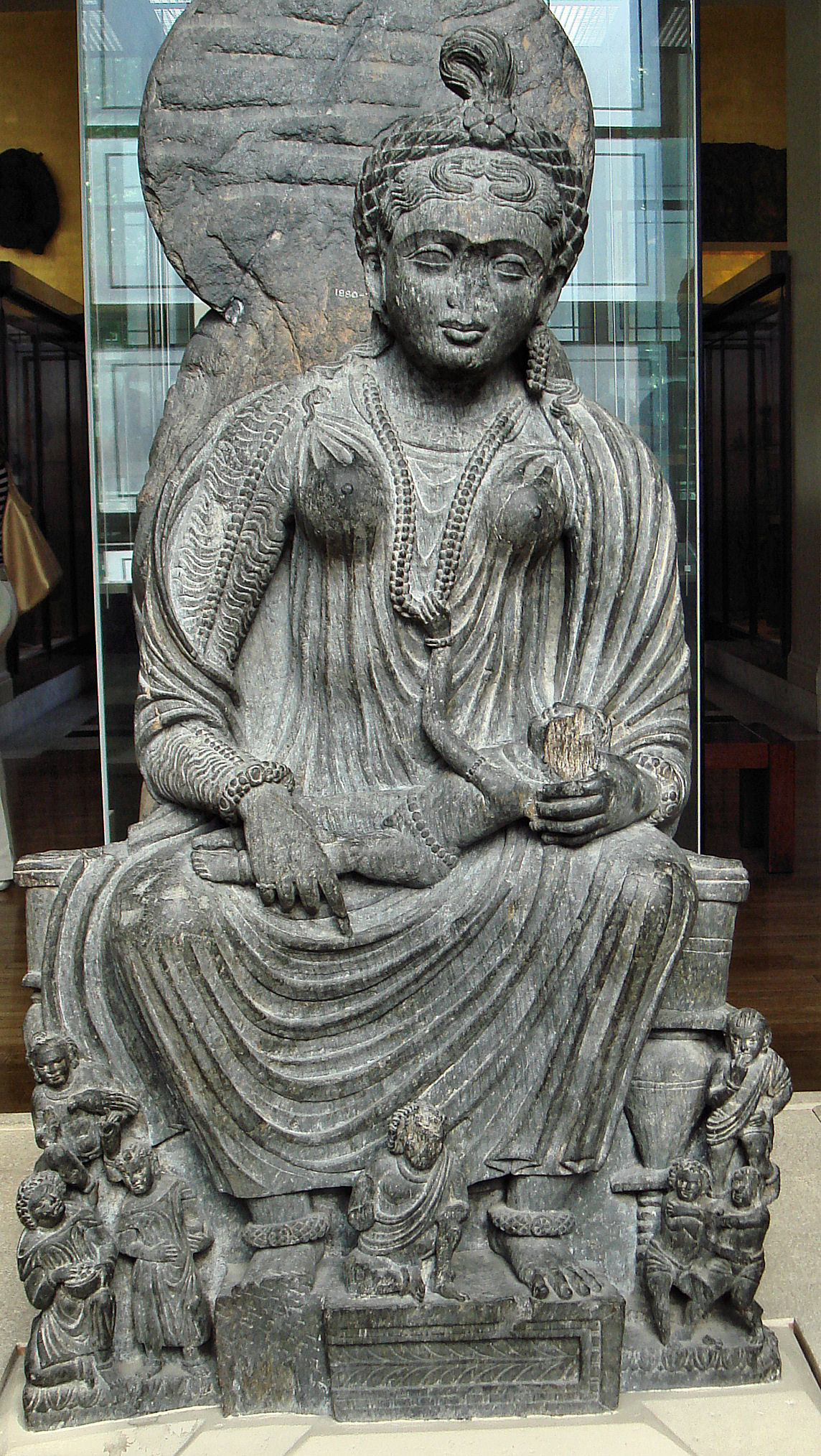
Hariti has been suggested as a source for depictions of the Virgin Mary. Gandhara, 2nd or 3rd century

R.C. Amore refers to a miracle from the first chapter of Mahavagga, the Book of the Discipline, IV, where Buddha himself displayed his power over nature. Amore thinks that Jesus himself was influenced by Buddhist teachings and that Buddhist material continued to influence Christianity as it developed. R. Stehly gives six examples of parallel themes between the story of Peter's walking on the water and the Buddhist Jataka 190.

The Sinologist Martin Palmer has commented on the similarity between the Blessed Virgin Mary and Guan Yin. Guanyin is the Chinese name for a male bodhisattva in India and Tibet, Avalokitesvara, who underwent a gradual feminization process in China late in the first millennium CE, after a period of proselytization by Turkic Nestorian Christians. The Tzu-Chi Foundation, a Taiwanese Buddhist organization, also noticing the similarity, commissioned a portrait of Guan Yin and a baby that resembles the typical Madonna and Child painting.

Z. P. Thundy has surveyed the similarities and differences between the birth stories of Buddha by Maya and Jesus by Mary and notes that while there are similarities such as virgin birth, there are also differences, e.g. that Mary outlives Jesus after raising him, but Maya dies soon after the birth of Buddha, as all mothers of Buddhas do in the Buddhist tradition. Thundy does not assert that there is any historical evidence that the Christian birth stories of Jesus were derived from the Buddhist traditions, but suggests that as an avenue for further research.

Jonathan Silk emphasizes the miraculous and god-like behaviors and words of the Buddha, Siddhartha Gautama, in his young years, an infant proclaiming he will attain a cease to suffering, and that he knows all spiritual knowledge there is to reach this goal. Silk continues on to describe the same Gautama Buddha as a surprised and appalled adolescent finding out the reality of sickness and death in life - something inevitable to all humans. Silk explicitly states the paradox: "The infant, upon his birth, knows everything; the young man he becomes knows nothing", and spends the rest of the article attempting to persuade readers, specifically those who are Buddhist believers, to embark on this journey of attaining nirvana and facing the stark realities of life, just like the Buddha did. Silk argues that one possible reason for this paradox in the Buddha's life is to show Buddhist believers that there is darkness and ignorance in the world that can be overcome through practice and rebirth, just like the Buddha.

Another author, Kristi Upson-Saia contemplates the purposes and reactions to ancient childhood stories of the boy Jesus, especially as many of these stories are contradictory to the benevolent and tender-hearted savior most of the world knows him as. Upson-Saia presents the reader with stories of Jesus cursing and killing his teacher who had just reprimanded him. Upson-Saia speculates that many of the ill-fitting anecdotes of Jesus' childhood may have been fabricated as a predictor of the future narratives of Jesus. One example Upson-Saia gives is the outburst of anger that Jesus shows in the temple as recorded in three of the four gospels.

One supposition in particular stuck out as many connections can be drawn to Silk's article on the account of the Buddha's life; Upson-Saia parallels the extraordinary knowledge and wisdom of the boy Jesus in the classroom to that of young Krishna (of Hinduism) and young Buddha (of Buddhism). Upson-Saia goes on to link Jesus' actions to other ancient narratives of gods, like Hercules.

== Irreconcilable foundations ==
There are inherent and fundamental differences between Buddhism and Christianity, one significant difference being that while Christianity is at its core monotheistic and relies on a God as a Creator, Buddhism is generally non-theistic and rejects the notion of a Creator God who provides divine values for the world.

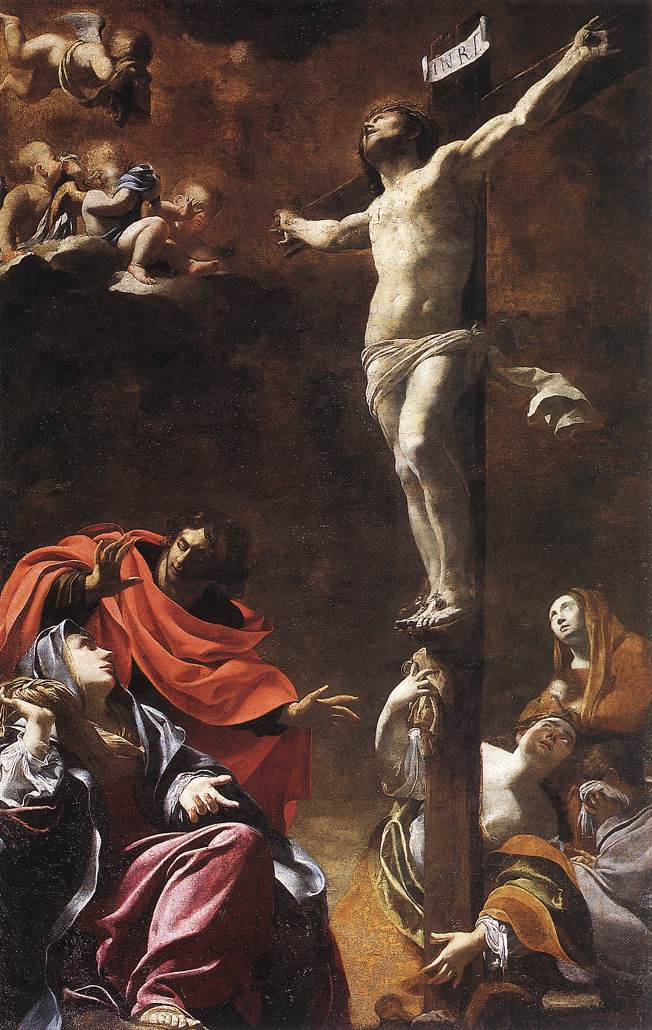
The Crucifixion (1622) by Simon Vouet; Church of Jesus, Genoa. The crucifixion of Jesus is at the center of Christian theology.

The Nicene Creed, the most widely used Christian creed, states that "We believe in one God, the Father Almighty, Maker of heaven and earth, of all that is seen and unseen." However, the notion of theistic creation is generally foreign to Buddhist thought, and the question of the existence of God is perhaps one of the most fundamental barriers between the teachings of Christianity and Buddhism. Although Mahayana Buddhism expresses belief in Bodhisattva, this is very different from the notion of Creator God in Christianity. While some variations of Buddhism believe in an impersonal eternal Buddha or creative force, in general Buddhism sees the universe as eternal and without a starting point of creation.

There are inherent differences in the Christian and Buddhist beliefs regarding the End Times and eschatology. Jan Nattier states that while Buddhism has a notion of "relative eschatology" that refers to specific cycles of life, the term "Buddhist eschatology" does not relate to any "final things", or that the world will end one day - Buddhist scripture routinely referring to the "beginning-less Saṃsāra" as a never ending cycle of birth and death with no starting point. However, Christian eschatology directly involves the concept of "end to all creation" at the Last Judgement when the world will reach its conclusion. Scholars generally regard the Buddhist and Christian views of the End Times as incompatible.

There are other fundamental differences, e.g. while grace is part of the very fabric of Christian theology, in Theravada Buddhism no deity can interfere with karma and hence the notion of any type of grace is inadmissible within these teachings. Mahayana Buddhism however, differs on this issue.

The crucifixion of Jesus as a single event in history that acts for the atonement of sins is a central element of Christian belief. This, however, produces a strong difference between Christian and Buddhist teachings. Buddhist scholar Masao Abe pointed out that while "the event of the Cross" is central to Christianity, it is not possible for Buddhism to accept its importance. Buddhist philosopher D. T. Suzuki stated that every time he saw a crucifixion scene it reminded him of the "gap that lies deep" between Christianity and Buddhism.

This inherent difference in the belief systems is also reflected on the iconic imagery of the two traditions. The depiction of the harsh crucifixion of Jesus as a willing sacrifice for the atonement for the sins of humanity is central to Christian iconography, and is totally different from the peaceful death of an eighty-year-old Gautama Buddha lying between two trees as he accepts final Nirvana. (Or Parinirvana)

Moreover, modern scholarship has generally rejected suggestions of an influence from Buddhism on Christianity as fanciful and without any historical basis. Paula Fredriksen states that no serious scholarly work places Jesus outside the backdrop of 1st-century Palestinian Judaism.

== See also ==
- Buddhism and Christianity
- Index of Buddhism-related articles
- List of converts to Christianity from Buddhism
- List of converts to Buddhism from Christianity
- Parallelomania
- Religious views on truth
