= Manyu sukta =

Religious hymn from the Rigveda

Manyu suktam is hymn 10.83 and 10.84 from the Rigveda. It contains 14 verses and is dedicated to the deity Manyu. Manyu in Vedic Sanskrit stands for anger, temper, or passion. The deity Manyu worshipped in this sukta is visualised in Veda as the Lord Rudra, who is victorious over anger, temper, or passion. Other devatas such as Varuna, Indra, and Maruts are also mentioned in this sukta. In Dvaita Vedanta, however, these two sūktas are used in the invocation of Narasimha, the lion-faced god described in Bhagavatam.

The renowned sectarian Vaishnava theologian Madhvacharya quoted Manyu Sukta in the context of Bhima killing Dushasana in the Mahabharata war and said that Bhima invoked Lord Narasimha through this hymn after killing Dushasana. Vaishnava saint Dhirendra Tirtha wrote a commentary on the Manyu Sukta and dedicated it to Lord Narasimha. Indian scholar V. R. Panchamukhi has said, "The commentary Manyu Sūkta by Sri Dhirendratirtha interprets Manyu as Narasimha, the internal controller of Rudra and who is the embodiment of knowledge."
