= Islam and other religions =

World Muslim population by percentage (Pew Research Center, 2014).

Islam and other religions is the complex theological, legal, and historical relationship between Islam and other faith traditions. Over the centuries of Islamic history, Muslims have held many different attitudes towards other religions. Some Muslim-majority countries are open to freedom of religion, but some are not. The Qur'an prescribes that the People of the Book – i.e., Jews, Christians, and Zoroastrians – have a special status.

== Al-Baqara 256 ==
The 256th verse (ayah) of Al-Baqara, in the Quran, includes the phrase that "there is no compulsion in religion". The Quran says that, since the revelation has clearly distinguished righteousness from unrighteousness, the people must choose which to follow. This verse immediately follows The Verse of the Throne.

== Non-Muslims and Islam ==
The Qur'an distinguishes between the monotheistic People of the Book (ahl al-kitab), i.e., Jews, Christians, Sabians and others on the one hand and polytheists or idolaters on the other hand. There are certain kinds of restrictions that apply to polytheists but not to "People of the Book" in classical Islamic law. One example is that Muslim males are allowed to marry a Christian or Jew, but not a polytheist. Muslim women, however, may not marry non-Muslim men.

The Quran told Muslims to discuss the common points between Muslims and non-Muslims. It directs Muslims not to fight with people of the Book.

The idea of Islamic infallibility is encapsulated in the formula, "Islam is exalted and nothing is exalted above it."

Abraham, Moses, Hebrew prophets, and Jesus were all prophets of Islam, but according to Muslim tradition their message and the texts of the Torah and the Gospels were corrupted.

And dispute not with the People of the Book, except with means better than mere disputation, unless I be with those of them who inflict wrong and injury, but say to them: "We believe in the revelation which has come down to us and in that which came down to you; Our God and your God is one; and it is to Him that we bow.

Apostasy in Islam can be punishable by death and/or imprisonment, according to some interpretations. Still, they are only found in hadiths and there is nothing in the Quran that commands the death penalty for apostasy, so the issue of apostasy is controversial. W. Heffening states that Shafi'is interpret verse ^{[Quran 2:217]} as adducing the main evidence for the death penalty in the Qur'an. Wael Hallaq states the death penalty was a new element added later and "reflects a later reality and does not stand in accord with the deeds of the Prophet." He further states that "nothing in the law governing apostate and apostasy derives from the letter of the holy text." There are also interpretations according to which apostates are not executed or punished, and there is freedom of religion.

In the 7th-century text Concerning Heresy, the Christian scholar John of Damascus named Islam as Christological heresy, referring to it as the "heresy of the Ishmaelites". The position has remained popular in Christian circles well into the 20th century, by theologians such as the Congregationalist cleric Frank Hugh Foster and the Roman Catholic historian Hilaire Belloc, the latter of whom described it as "the great and enduring heresy of Mohammed."

== Early Muslim practice ==
Some Jews generally rejected Muhammad's status as a prophet. According to Watt, "Jews would normally be unwilling to admit that a non-Jew could be a prophet." In the Constitution of Medina, Muhammad demanded the Jews' political loyalty in return for religious and cultural autonomy. In every major battle with the Medinans, two local Jewish tribes were found to be treacherous (see ^{[Quran 2:100]}). After Badr and Uhud, the Banu Qainuqa and Banu Nadir (the latter being an ethnic Arab tribe who converted to Judaism, according to the Muslim historian al-Yaqubi), respectively, took up arms against the ummah and were subsequently expelled "with their families and possessions" from Medina.

The Syriac Patriarch Ishôyahb III wrote in his correspondence to Simeon of Rewardashir, "As for the Arabs, to whom God has at this time given rule (shultãnâ) over the world, you know well how they act toward us. Not only do they not oppose Christianity, but they praise our faith, honour the priests and saints of our Lord, and give aid to the churches and monasteries."

After Muhammad's death in 632, Islamic rule grew rapidly, encompassing what is now the Middle East, Egypt, North Africa, and Iran. Most of the new subjects were Christian, Jewish, and Zoroastrian, the first two being considered People of the Book. (After some argument, the Zoroastrians were considered People of the Book as well.)

== Later Islamic practices ==
=== Later Islamic conquests ===
From historical evidence, it appears Tokharistan was the only area of Iran heavily colonized by Arabs, where Buddhism flourished when they arrived and the only area incorporated into the Arab empire where Sanskrit studies were pursued up to the conquest. The grandson of Barmak was the vizier of the empire and took a personal interest in Sanskrit works and Indian religions. When the Barmakids were removed from power and their influence disappeared, no further translations of Sanskrit works into Arabic are known until that of Al-Biruni.

=== Comparative religion and anthropology of religion ===
After the Arab conquest of the Buddhist center of Balkh, a Quranic commentator was denounced for anthropomorphism, a standard attack on those sympathetic to Buddhism. Hiwi al-Balkhi had attacked the authority of the Quran and revealed religions, reciting the claims of Zoroastrianism, Christianity and Judaism.

In the early 11th century, the Islamic scholar Abū Rayhān Bīrūnī wrote detailed comparative studies on the anthropology of religions across the Middle East, Mediterranean and especially the Indian subcontinent. Biruni's anthropology of religion was only possible for a scholar deeply immersed in the lore of other nations.

According to Arthur Jeffery, "It is rare until modern times to find so fair and unprejudiced a statement of the views of other religions, so earnest an attempt to study them in the best sources, and such care to find a method which for this branch of study would be both rigorous and just." Biruni compared Islam with pre-Islamic religions, and was willing to accept certain elements of pre-Islamic wisdom that conformed with his understanding of the Islamic spirit.

In the introduction to his Indica, Biruni himself writes that his intent behind the work was to engage dialogue between Islam and the Indian religions, particularly Hinduism as well as Buddhism. Biruni was aware that statements about a religion would be open to criticism by its adherents, and insisted that a scholar should follow the requirements of a strictly scientific method. According to William Montgomery Watt, Biruni "is admirably objective and unprejudiced in his presentation of facts" but "selects facts in such a way that he makes a strong case for holding that there is a certain unity in the religious experience of the peoples he considers, even though he does not appear to formulate this view explicitly." Biruni argued that Hinduism was a monotheistic faith like Islam, and in order to justify this assertion, he quotes Hindu texts and argues that the worship of idols is "exclusively a characteristic of the common people, with which the educated have nothing to do."

Biruni argued that the worship of idols "is due to a kind of confusion or corruption." According to Watt, Biruni "goes on to maintain that in the course of generations the origin of the veneration of the images is forgotten, and further that the ancient legislators, seeing that the Veneration of images is advantageous, made it obligatory for the ordinary. He mentions the view of some people that, before God sent prophets, all mankind were idol-worshippers, but he apparently does not presumably held that, apart from the messages transmitted by prophets, men could know the existence and unity of God by rational methods of philosophy." Biruni argued that "the Hindus, no less than the Greeks, have philosophers who are believers in monotheism." Al-Biruni also compared Islam and Christianity, citing passages from the Qur'an and the Bible which state that their followers should always speak the truth.

== Contemporary Islam ==
Some countries are predominantly Muslim and allow freedom of religion, adhering to democratic principles. Of particular note are the following countries:

- Indonesia and Malaysia have a significant population from the Hindu, Christian and Buddhist religions.
- In Syria, there are about 2.2 million Christians (10–12% of the population) from about 15 different religious and ethnic sects (Greek Orthodox, Syrian Orthodox, Church of the East, Protestants, Armenians Apostolic and various Catholics, Greek, Syrian, Armenian, Chaldean, Maronite, Latin), as well as a few dozen Jews. They have many hundreds of independent privately owned churches and some 15 synagogues. The freedom of religion is well observed by the state law and reflected in the country's long historical record of tolerance since the Umayyad Caliphate days. Christmas and Easter are official holidays for both the Catholic and Orthodox calendar.
- Pakistan has different electorates for Muslims and non-Muslims, and also two chief justices of the Supreme Court of Pakistan were Hindu and Christian after the formation of the country.

Other Islamic nations are not so tolerant of minority religions:

- The constitution of the Islamic Republic of Iran recognizes Islam, Christianity, Judaism, and Zoroastrianism as People of the Book and official religions, and they are granted the right to exercise religious freedom in Iran. Five of the 270 seats in parliament are reserved for these three religions. However, the situation of the followers of the Bahá'í Faith, the largest religious minority in the country, is far worse. State-sanctioned persecution of Bahá'ís allows them to be attacked and dehumanized on political, religious, and social grounds to separate Bahá'ís from the rest of society. According to Eliz Sanasarian, "Of all non-Muslim religious minorities the persecution of the Bahá'ís has been the most widespread, systematic, and uninterrupted." See Religion in Iran and Persecution of Bahá'ís. Also, senior government posts are reserved for Muslims. All minority religious groups are barred from being elected president. Jewish, Christian and Zoroastrian schools must be run by Muslim principals. Compensation for death paid to the family of a non-Muslim was (by law) less than if the victim was a Muslim. Conversion to Islam is encouraged by entitling converts to inherit the entire share of their parents' (or even uncle's) estate if their siblings (or cousins) remain non-Muslim. Iran's non-Muslim population has fallen dramatically. For example, the Jewish population in Iran dropped from 80,000 to 30,000 in the first two decades of the revolution.
- In Egypt, a 16 December 2006 judgement of the Supreme Administrative Council created a clear demarcation between "recognized religions"—Islam, Christianity and Judaism—and all other religious beliefs; the ruling effectively delegitimizes and forbids the practice of all but these aforementioned religions. The ruling leaves members of other religious communities, including Bahá'ís, without the ability to obtain the necessary government documents to have rights in their country, essentially denying them all rights of citizenship. They cannot obtain ID cards (resulting in the Egyptian identification card controversy), birth certificates, death certificates, marriage or divorce certificates, and passports; they also cannot be employed, educated, treated in public hospitals or vote among other things.

According to Islamic law, jizya (poll tax) is to be paid by all non-Muslims living in a Muslim state, excluding the weak and the poor, for the general welfare of the state. Also, in his book "Al-Kharaj," Abu Yusuf says, "No Jizya is due on females or young infants." In exchange for the tax, the non-Muslims are required to be given security, provided compensation from the Muslim Exchequer when they are in need, treated equally with Muslims, and enjoy rights as nationals of the state. Al-Balathiri comments on this, saying, "Khaled Ibn Al-Walid, on entering Damascus as a conqueror, offered a guarantee of security to its people and their properties and churches, and promised that the wall of the city would not be pulled down, and none of their houses would be demolished. It was a guarantee of God, he said, and of the Caliph and all believers to keep them safe and secure on condition they paid the dues of the Jizya."

== Islamic views on religious pluralism ==
Surah Al-Ma'idah verse 48 states:

If Allah so willed, He would have made you a single People, but His plan is to test each of you separately, in what He has given to each of you: so strive in all virtues as in you are in a race. The goal of all of you is to Allah. It is He that will show you the truth of the matters in which ye dispute.

— Quran 5:48

Surah Al-Ankabut verse 46 states:

And do not argue with the People of the Scripture except in a way that is best, except for those who commit injustice among them, and say, "We believe in that which has been revealed to us and revealed to you. And our God and your God is one; and we are Muslims [in submission] to Him."

The Quran criticizes Christians and Jews who believed that their own religions are the only source of truth:

They say, if you want to be guided to salvation, you should either become a Jew or Christian. Say: What about the religion of Abraham, he also worshiped no one but Allah. We believe in Allah, and the revelation given to us, and to Abraham, to Ishmael, Isaac, Jacob, and the Tribes of Israel, and that given to Moses and Jesus, and that given to all prophets from their Lord: We make no difference between one and another of them: And we bow to Allah. So, if they believe, they are indeed on the right path, but if they turn back, Allah will suffice them, and He is the All-Hearing, the All-Knowing. This is the Baptism of Allah. And who can baptize better than Allah. And it is He Whom we worship. Say: Will you dispute with us about Allah, He is our Lord and your Lord; that we are responsible for our doings and you for yours; and that We are sincere in Him? Or do ye say that Abraham, Ishmael, Isaac, Jacob and the Tribes were Jews or Christians? Say: Do ye know better than Allah? Ah! who is more unjust than those who conceal the testimony they have from Allah. But Allah is not unmindful of what ye do! That was a people that hath passed away. They shall reap the fruit of what they did, and ye of what ye do! Of their merits there is no question in your case.

— Quran 2:135-141

Surah Al-Baqara verse 113 states:

The Jews say: "The Christians have nothing to stand upon"; and the Christians say: "The Jews have nothing to stand upon." Yet they both have something to stand upon, they both recite the Book. Like unto their word is what those say who know not; but Allah will judge between them in their quarrel on the Day of Judgment.

— Quran 2:113

Surah 3 verse 64 states:

Say: "O People of the Book! Come to what is common between us and you: That we worship none but God, that we associate no partners with Him, that we erect not, from among ourselves, Lords other than Allah. If then they turn back, say: 'Bear witness that we are bowing to Allah’s will.'"

— Quran 3:64

Islam's fundamental theological concept is the belief in one God. Muslims are not expected to visualize God but to worship and adore him as a protector. Any kind of idolatry is condemned in Islam. (Quran 112:2)

Muslims believe that Allah sent the Qur'an to bring peace and harmony to humanity through Islam (submission to Allah). Religious persecution is also prohibited.^{[Quran 10:99–100 (Translated by Yusuf Ali)]}

Various sects became intolerant when gaining favour with the rulers, and often work to oppress or eliminate rival sects, for example, the contemporary persecution of Muslim minorities in Saudi Arabia.

=== Views on forms of worship in other religions ===
The 14th century Sufi saint Abd al-Karim al-Jili stated that all principal religions actually worship Allah in their own way:

1. The Infidels; they disbelieve in a lord, because they worship the essence of God which reflects there is no lord over him.
2. The Physicists; worshipping the natural properties, which are actually attributes of God.
3. The Philosophers; worshipping the seven planets, which represents further names of God.
4. The Dualists; worshipping God as the Creator and the One.
5. The Magians; worship God in the names of Unity in which all names and attributes past just as fire destroys and transmutes them in their nature.
6. The Materialists; denying a creator and instead believe in the eternity of Time. Thus they just believe in his He-ness, in which God is just potentially but not actually creative.
7. The Jews.
8. The Sabians (Mandaeans).
9. The Christians.
10. The Muslims.

Although there are different ways to worship God, those who do not worship like it was ordinated by a prophet will suffer in the afterlife. This suffering causes pleasure, because they feel spiritual delight in the way of their worship until they repent and take refuge in God.

The Sunni scholar and mystic Mahmoud Shabestari holds that every religion is in some way worshipping Allah. Even idol-worshippers actually would unconsciously worship him.

== Forced conversion ==
The Quran Al-Baqara 256 says, "Let there be no compulsion in religion: Truth stands out clear from Error" (Quran 2:256 and Quran 18:29).

Quranic translator M. A. S. Abdel Haleem wrote of the Sword Verse, verse 9:5 of At-Tawba 5: "In this context, this definitely refers to the ones who broke the treaty" between Muslims and a group of idolaters during the time of Muhammad.

According to historian Bernard Lewis, forced conversions played a role, especially in the 12th century under the Almohad dynasty of North Africa and Andalusia. He is also of the opinion that other incidents of forced conversions have been rare in Islamic history. He adds that "In the early centuries of Islamic rule, there was little or no attempt at forcible conversion, the spread of the faith being effected rather by persuasion and inducement." A few well-known examples of forced conversion are:

- Anusim of Meshhad, the Jewish community was forced, on pain of death, to convert in 1839 under Qajar rule. Most continued Jewish practices in secret and many of their descendants returned to Judaism in the early 20th century.
- Francis Bok—Sudanese-American activist, from Christianity; later returned to his Christian faith.
- Steve Centanni and Olaf Wiig—forced to convert at gunpoint by terrorists of the Holy Jihad Brigades.
- Sabbatai Zevi—convert from Judaism, 17th-century mystic, pseudo-Messiah and the self-proclaimed "King of Jews." Converted ostensibly of his own free will, while in prison. Although some speculate that he may have been executed for treason had he not converted. Muslim authorities were opposed to his death.

== See also ==
- Al-Baqara 256
- Criticism of Islam
- Divisions of the world in Islam
- Christianity and Islam
- Mormonism and Islam
- Hinduism and Islam
- Jainism and Islam
- Islam and Sikhism
- Islam and Judaism
- Islam and antisemitism
- Persecution of Shia Muslims
- Islamic missionary activity
