= Al-Bayyina =

98th chapter of the Qur'an

Surah 98 of the Quran
البينة Al-Bayyinah The Evidence
- Qira'ah; English text
- Classification: Medinan^{(contested)}
- Other names: Evidence, The Proof, The Clear Sign, The Evidence of the Truth
- Position: Juzʼ 30
- No. of verses: 8

Al-Bayyina
Recitation of Al-Bayyina in mujawwad.

Al-Bayyina or The Evidence (Arabic: البينة, al-bayyinah, "the clear proof") is the 98th chapter (surah) of the Qur'an, with 8 ayat or verses. The surah is titled after the word al-bayyinah, which occurs at the end of the first and fourth verses.

== Summary ==
- 1-2 The idolaters stagger at the revelations of the Quran.
- 3-4 Jews and Christians (a.k.a. "the People of the Book") dispute among themselves since the advent of Muhammad and his new religion.
- 5 Nonbelievers of all classes threatened with divine judgments
- 6 Those who disbelieve: Nonbelievers, People of the Book, and polytheists are the worst of all creatures, destined for hell forever.
- 7-8 'Those who believe and performs righteous deeds' are "the best of creatures"; their reward is heaven.

== Hadith ==
According to a narration from the Prophet, a servant who has doubts about God in his heart should not recite Surah Al-Baynah. Also, whoever recites this Surah at night, God will send angels to protect him in religious and worldly matters and to seek forgiveness for him. And whoever recites it during the day receives a reward equivalent to everything upon which the light of day shines and which the darkness of night envelops.

Abu al-Darda also narrated from the Prophet: "If people knew what was hidden in this Surah, they would certainly leave their families and wealth to learn it."
