= Hinduism and other religions =

In the field of comparative religion, many scholars, academics, and religious figures have looked at the relationships between Hinduism and other religions.

== Indian religions ==
=== Buddhism ===
Buddhism and Hinduism have common origins in the Ganges culture of northern India during the "second urbanisation" around 500 BCE. They have shared parallel beliefs that have existed side by side, but also pronounced differences.

=== Jainism ===
Hinduism and Jainism have a rather similar view on the topic of asceticism, or, in simpler terms, abstinence. It is thought that their beliefs on the topic come from the early belief that some meditative and monastic practices cleanse the body of impurity. The Hindu theory of Karma gave Jainism a great deal of support to start promoting asceticism. Both of these traditions attribute human greed, hatred, and delusion to the presence of impure residues (samskaras or vasanas) that must be cleansed as the individual person moves towards "freedom" (death). Both of these religions believe that practicing asceticism is not only to the benefit of the individual but also to the benefit of the society as a whole. Nonviolence plays a large role in both of these religions so the concept of asceticism relies greatly on both of their beliefs.

== Abrahamic religions ==
=== Christianity ===
==== History ====
Although little is known of the immediate growth of the church, Bar-Daisan (154–223 CE) reports that in his time there were Christian tribes in North India which claimed to have been converted by Thomas and to have books and relics to prove it.

==== Doctrine ====
Indian philosopher Sarvepalli Radhakrishnan, wrote:

Unfortunately Christian religion inherited the Semitic creed of the ‘jealous God’ in the view of Christ as ‘the only begotten son of God’ so could not brook any rival near the throne. When Europe accepted the Christian religion, in spite of its own broad humanism, it accepted the fierce intolerance which is the natural result of belief in 'the truth once for all delivered to the saints.'

In Hinduism (also in Jainism and Sikhism), the concept of moksha is akin to that of Buddhism's nirvana, but some scholars further claim that it is akin as well to Christianity's doctrine of salvation. Hindu sannyasi Swami Tripurari states:

... in theory the sinners of the world are the beneficiaries of Christ’s sacrifice, but it is God the father for whose pleasure Christ underwent the crucifixion, even when the father’s joy in this scenario lies in the salvation of sinners. Christ represents the intermediary between God and humanity, and his life aptly illustrates the fact that it is sacrifice by which we come to meet our maker. Thus in Christ the Divine teaches us “the way” more than he does the goal. The Christ conception represents “the way” in the sense that the way is sacrifice, out of which love arises. The Krishna conception represents that for which we not only should, but must sacrifice, compelled by the Godhead’s irresistible attributes, etc. depicted therein.

The Christian Ashram Movement, a movement within Christianity in India, embraces Vedanta and the teachings of the East, attempting to combine the Christian faith with the Hindu ashram model, and Christian monasticism with the Hindu sannyasa tradition. In Western countries, Vedanta has influenced some Christian thinkers (see also: Pierre Johanns, Abhishiktananda, Bede Griffiths), while others in the anti-cult movement have reacted against the activities of immigrant gurus and their followers.

== Other religions ==
Many theologians interpret Hinduism to teach that since all souls will eventually arrive at salvation, every religion can lead to it.

=== Baháʼí Faith ===
Hinduism is recognized in the Baháʼí Faith as one of four known religions and its scriptures are regarded as predicting the coming of Baháʼu'lláh (Kalki avatar). Krishna is included in the succession of Manifestations of God. The authenticity of the Hindu scriptures is seen as uncertain.

=== Zoroastrianism ===
The "Council of Dharmic Faiths" (UK) regards Zoroastrianism, whilst not originating in the Indian subcontinent, also as a Dharmic religion.

There are direct links between Hinduism and Zoroastrianism. Many analysts of Hinduism claim that Hinduism embraces elements of all contemporary religions, Hence scriptures of Hinduism such as Vedas and Puranas, along with Buddhism, Jainism and Sikhism, have incorporated and adopted significantly elements from the Avesta of Greek religion and Zoroastrianism: Asura from Ahura, Deva from Daeva, Hindu monotheism from Ahura Mazda, Varuna, Vishnu and Garuda from Agni, the heavenly juice from the drink called Soma-Haoma, the contemporary Indian and Persian war of Devasuras from Arya, Arya from Mithra, Mitra from Mithra, Dyaushpita and Jupiter from Jupiter, Yagya to Yagya, Narasanga to Narasangasa, Indra, Gandharva to Gandharva, Vajra, Vayu, Mantra, Yama, Ahuti, Hamta to Sumati etc.

==== Cognate terms ====
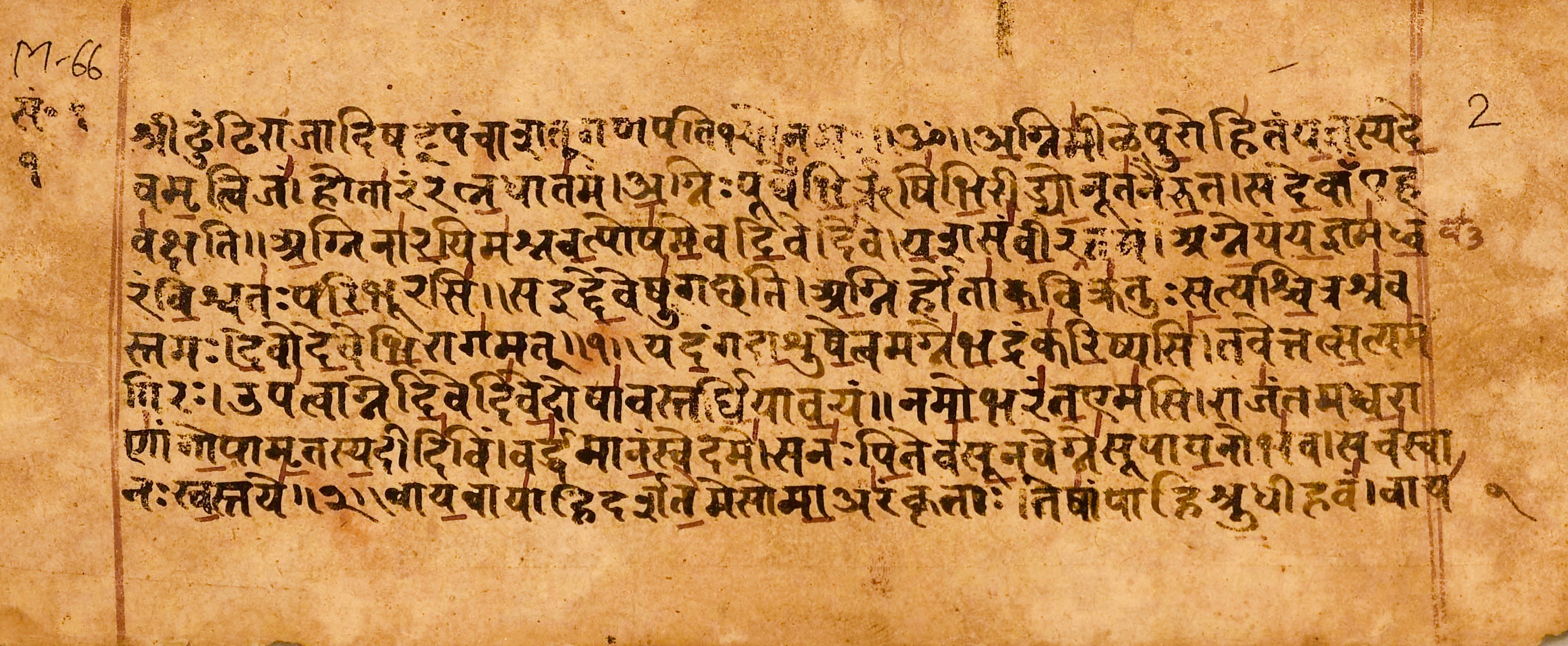
Rigveda manuscript page (1.1.1–9)

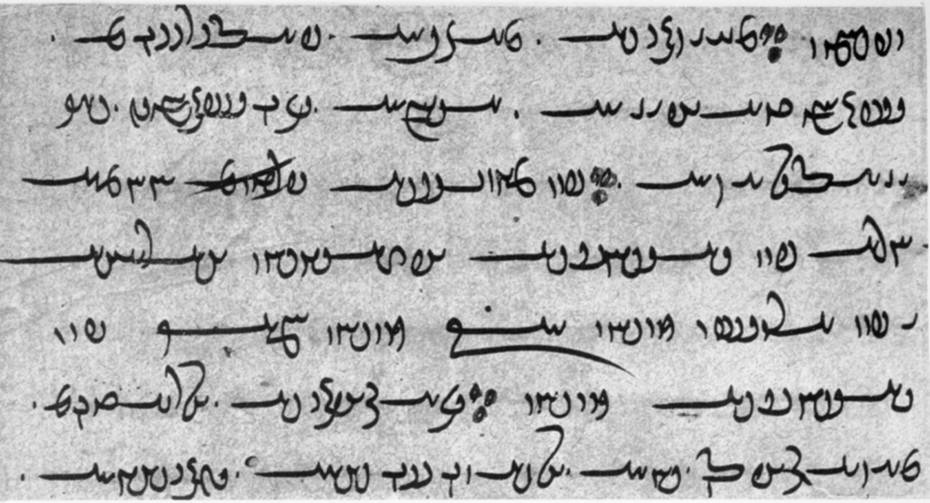
Yasna 28.1 (Bodleian MS J2)

The following is a list of cognate terms that may be gleaned from comparative linguistic analysis of the Rigveda and Avesta. Both collections are from the period after the proposed date of separation (c. 2nd millennium BC) of the Proto-Indo-Iranians into their respective Indic and Iranian branches.

Vedic Sanskrit	Avestan	Common meaning
āp	āp	"water," āpas "the Waters"
Apam Napat, Apām Napāt	Apām Napāt	the "water's offspring"
aryaman	airyaman	"Arya-hood" (lit:** "member of Arya community")
Asura Mahata/Medha (असुर महत/मेधा)	Ahura Mazda	"The Supreme Lord, Lord of Wisdom"
rta	asha/arta	"active truth", extending to "order" and "righteousness"
atharvan	āθrauuan, aθaurun Atar	"priest"
ahi	azhi, (aži)	"dragon, snake", "serpent"
daiva, deva	daeva, (daēuua)	a class of divinities
manu	manu	"man"
mitra	mithra, miθra	"oath, covenant"
asura	ahura	another class of spirits
sarvatat	Hauruuatāt	"intactness", "perfection"
Sarasvatī (Ārdrāvī śūrā anāhitā, आर्द्रावी शूरा अनाहिता)	Haraxvati/Haraxvaitī (Ārəduuī Sūrā Anāhitā)	a controversial (generally considered mythological) river, a river goddess
sauma, soma	haoma	a plant, deified
svar	hvar, xvar	the Sun, also cognate to Greek helios, Latin sol, Engl. Sun
Tapati	tapaiti	Possible fire/solar goddess; see Tabiti (a possibly Hellenised Scythian theonym). Cognate with Latin tepeo and several other terms.
Vrtra-/Vr̥tragʰná/Vritraban	verethra, vərəθra (cf. Verethragna, Vərəθraγna)	"obstacle"
Yama	Yima	son of the solar deity Vivasvant/Vīuuahuuant
yajña	yasna, object: yazata	"worship, sacrifice, oblation"
Gandharva	Gandarewa	"heavenly beings"
Nasatya	Nanghaithya	"twin Vedic gods associated with the dawn, medicine, and sciences"
Amarattya	Ameretat	"immortality"
Póṣa	Apaosha	"demon of drought"
Ashman	Asman	"sky, highest heaven"
Angira Manyu	Angra Mainyu	"destructive/evil spirit, spirit, temper, ardour, passion, anger, teacher of divine knowledge"
Manyu	Maniyu	"anger, wrath"
Sarva	Sarva	"Rudra, Vedic god of wind, Shiva"
Madhu	Madu	"honey"
Bhuta	Buiti	"ghost"
Mantra	Manthra	"sacred spell"
Aramati	Armaiti	"piety"
Amrita	Amesha	"nectar of immortality"
Amrita Spanda (अमृत स्पन्द)	Amesha Spenta	"holy nectar of immortality"
Sumati	Humata	"good thought"
Sukta	Hukhta	"good word"
Narasamsa	Nairyosangha	"praised man"
Vayu	Vaiiu	"wind"
Vajra	Vazra	"bolt"
Ushas	Ushah	"dawn"
Ahuti	azuiti	"offering"
púraṁdhi	purendi	
bhaga	baga	"lord, patron, wealth, prosperity, sharer/distributor of good fortune"
Usij	Usij	"priest"
trita	thrita	"the third"
Mas	Mah	"moon, month"
Vivasvant	Vivanhvant	"lighting up, matutinal"
Druh	Druj	"Evil spirit"
Ahi Dasaka	Azhi Dahaka	"biting serpent"

=== Yezidism ===
Recently, some people have found similarities between the customs of Hindus and Yezidis, suggesting that in ancient times they may have even been one people. Recent comparisons and historical research between the two people have revealed many links that now thousands of Hindus and Yezidis believe that they are part of the same family.

== See also ==
- Indian religions
- Eastern religions
- Religious harmony in India
