= Parallelomania =

Exegetical attitudes

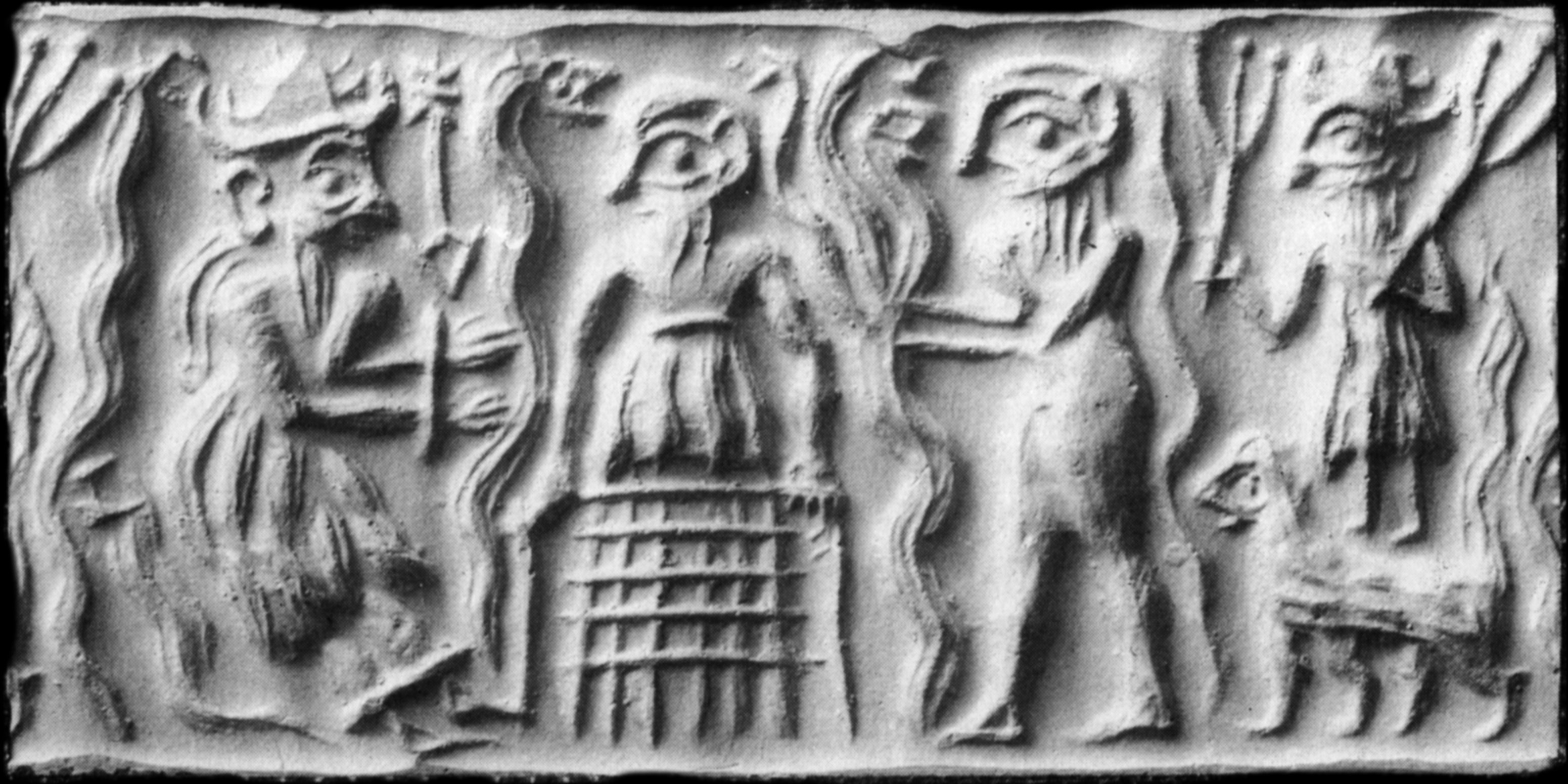
Ancient Sumerian cylinder seal impression: Dumuzid tortured in the Underworld by the galla

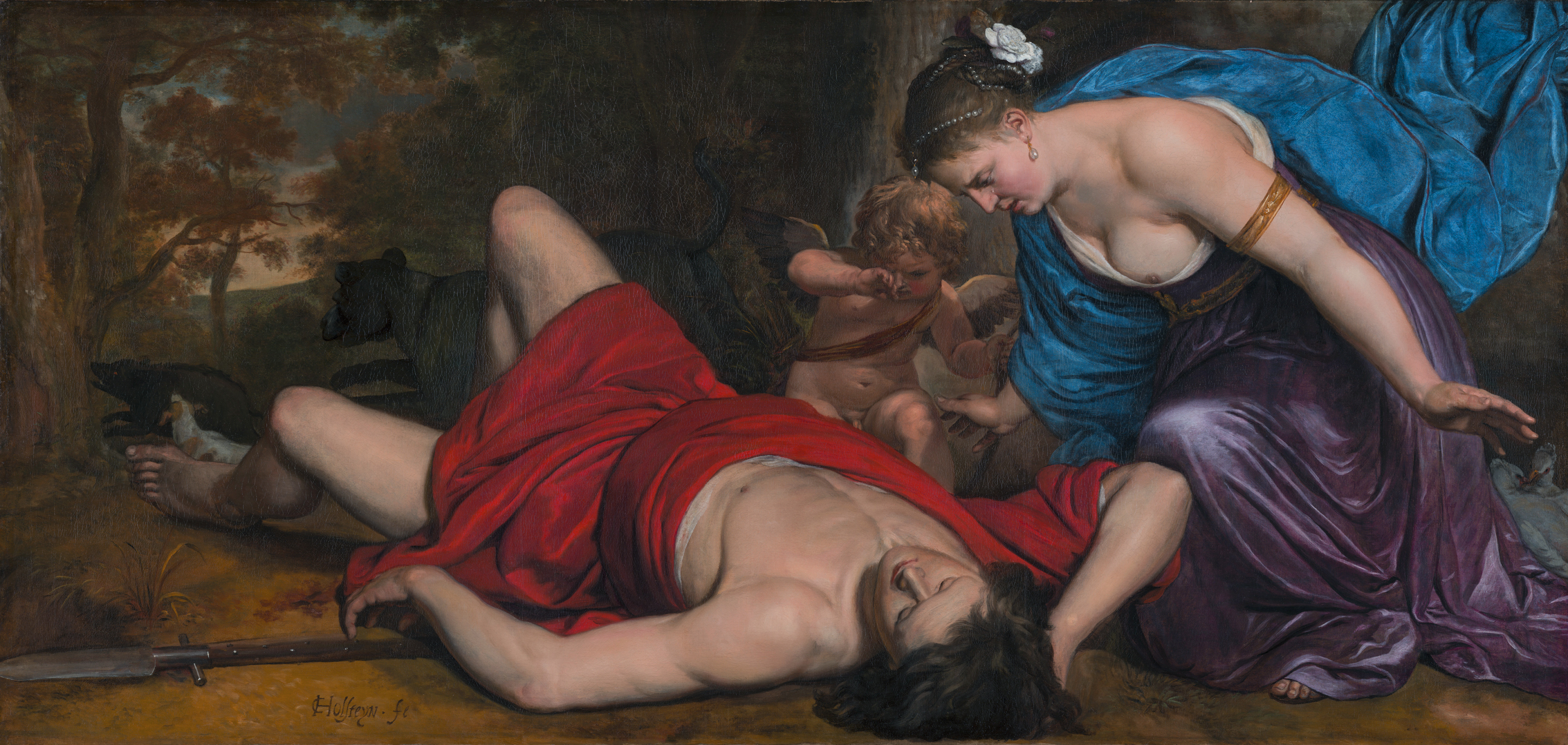
Venus and Cupid lamenting the dead Adonis (1656) by Cornelis Holsteyn

The dying-and-rising deity motif may be an example of parallelomania, and dismissing it might be an example of parallelophobia

In historical analysis, biblical criticism and comparative mythology/religion, parallelomania has been used to refer to a phenomenon (mania) where authors perceive apparent similarities and construct parallels and analogies without historical basis.

The concept was introduced to scholarly circles in 1961 by Rabbi Samuel Sandmel (1911–1979) of the Hebrew Union College in a paper of the same title, where he stated that he had first encountered the term in a French book of 1830, but did not recall the author or the title. Sandmel stated that the simple observations of similarity between historical events are often less than valid, but at times lead to a phenomenon where an author first notices a supposed similarity, overdoses on analogy, and then "proceeds to describe source and derivation as if implying a literary connection flowing in an inevitable or predetermined direction". Martin McNamara, MSC (Milltown Institute of Theology and Philosophy) stated that Sandmel's initial paper has proven to be "highly influential".

Christian and Jewish scholars have used the concept in a number of cases and areas. Thomas Schreiner (Southern Baptist Theological Seminary) applies it to over-generalization of the simple use of the verb "see" used as a participle to refer to a casual act of observation, to extending its meaning to have deeper spiritual contexts in order to construct parallels. Jewish scholar Jacob Neusner has stated that some portrayals of Aphrahat as someone who cherry picked from Rabbinical literature are based on weak parallels which fall within Sandmel's characterization of parallelomania. Joseph Fitzmyer, a priest of the Society of Jesus (SJ), states the analyses of the Pauline epistles have at times suffered from parallelomania through the construction of unwarranted analogies with prior traditions. Gerald O'Collins, SJ states that most scholars are now aware of the pitfalls of parallelomania which exaggerate the importance of trifling resemblances.

== See also ==
- Apophenia
- Correspondence (theology)
- Hyperdiffusionism in archaeology
- Panbabylonism
- Pareidolia
- Typology (theology)
