= List of former Buddhists =

The following is a list of former Buddhists who no longer identify as such, organized by their current religious affiliation or ideology.

== Atheism ==
Name	Nationality	Notes	Refs.
Adam Carolla	American	Radio, TV, and podcast personality, raised as a Buddhist, now identifies as non-religious and an atheist.	

== Christianity ==
Name	Nationality	Notes	Refs.
Mitsuo Fuchida	Japanese	Imperial Japanese Navy Air Service captain noted for involvement in the attack on Pearl Harbor who later became an evangelist	
Kari Lake	American	politician and former television news anchor, converted from Buddhism to evangelical Christianity	
Zack Lee	Indonesian	actor and boxer	
Jaruvan Maintaka	Thai	former Auditor-General of Thailand	
Chieko N. Okazaki	American	Relief Society leader, converted from Buddhism to the Church of Jesus Christ of Latter-day Saints	
Talduwe Somarama	Sri Lankan	former Buddhist monk and assassin	
Charlie Soong	Chinese	businessman and missionary	
Janice Vidal	Hong Konger	singer	
Paul Williams	British	professor in Indian religions at the University of Bristol	
Ben Weasel	American	singer and guitarist for the punk rock band Screeching Weasel, converted from Buddhism to Catholicism	
Vanness Wu	Taiwan	actor and singer	
Yu Tian	Taiwan	singer-politician	

== Hinduism ==
- Mihirakula – Huna ruler
- Rajasinghe I – Sri Lankan king who conquered Kandy
- Rishabhadatta – Satrap viceroy
- Rudradaman I – Satrap ruler and conqueror of the Satavahanas

== Islam ==
- The Barmakid family – originally the guardians of the great Buddhist shrine near Balkh, upon conversion they became "the greatest family" in the early Abbasid caliphate
- Muhammad ibn Suri – king of the Ghurid dynasty from the 10th-century to 1011
- Mahmud Ghazan – seventh ruler of the Ilkhanate
- Korguz – was a Uyghur governor of Khorasan during the reign of the Mongol ruler Ogedei Khan
- Muhammad Khodabandeh – eighth Ilkhaid dynasty ruler in Iran from 1304 to 1316
- Mubarak Shah – head of the ulus of the Chagatai Khanate (1252–1260, March–September 1266)
- Donei Kalaminjaa – king of the Maldives
- Tarmashirin – Khan of the Chagatai Khanate following Duwa Timur
- Hussein Ye – Islamic scholar of Chinese Malaysian descent whose lectures are frequently aired on Peace TV

== See also ==
- List of converts to Buddhism
