= Manyu (deity) =

Hindu deity

- Affiliation: Rudras
- Texts: Rigveda

Manyu (Sanskrit: मन्यु, lit. 'passion') is a war god in Vedic Hinduism. He is a deity referenced in the Rigveda, with hymns dedicated to him in the eponymous Manyu Sukta.

== Literature ==
=== Vedas ===
The hymns of the Rigveda extol Manyu as the "slayer of foes", "self-existent", "wielder of the thunder", and "much-invoked". Manyu is identified with deities such as Indra, Varuna, and Agni. These hymns urge Manyu to grant treasure and wealth, strength in battles, and overwhelm the enemy with terror.

The Atharvaveda also mentions the deity in a hymn dedicated to Kama.

=== Brahma Purana ===
The Brahma Purana describes the origin of Manyu. It states that a terrible war was once waged between the devas and the asuras, in which the former were defeated. The devas are stated to have travelled to the Gautamī river valley, where they performed a penance to propitiate Shiva. The destroyer deity is said to have produced Manyu from his third eye, and presented him to the devas. In the subsequent battle that followed, Manyu's assistance allowed the devas to gain victory.

=== Bhagavata Purana ===
Shiva is referred to as Manyu in the Bhagavata Purana.

=== Associations ===
Manyu is also described to be one of the eleven Rudras.

Some philosophers like Madhavacharya have posited that Manyu is merely an epithet of Narasimha, an avatar of Vishnu.
