= Sabians =

Religious group mentioned in the Quran

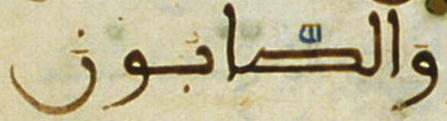
"... and the Sabians", Quran 5:69 (Note: Maghrebi manuscript, c. 1250–1350)

The Sabians, sometimes also spelled Sabaeans or Sabeans, are a religious group mentioned three times in the Quran (as الصابئون al-Ṣābiʾūn, in later sources الصابئة al-Ṣābiʾa), where it is implied that they belonged to the 'People of the Book' (ahl al-kitāb). Their original identity, which seems to have been forgotten at an early date, has been called an "unsolved Quranic problem". Modern scholars have variously identified them as Mandaeans, Manichaeans, Sabaeans, Elchasaites, Archontics, ḥunafāʾ (either as a type of Gnostics or as "sectarians"), or as adherents of the astral religion of Harran. Some scholars believe that it is impossible to establish their original identity with any degree of certainty.

At least from the ninth century on, the Quranic epithet 'Sabian' was claimed by various religious groups who sought recognition by the Muslim authorities as a People of the Book deserving of legal protection (dhimma). Among those are the Sabians of Harran, adherents of a poorly understood ancient Semitic religion centered in the upper Mesopotamian city of Harran, who were described by Syriac Christian heresiographers as star worshippers. These Harranian Sabians practiced an old Semitic form of polytheism, combined with a significant amount of Hellenistic elements. Most of the historical figures known in the ninth–eleventh centuries as al-Ṣābiʼ were probably either members of this Harranian religion or descendants of such members, most notably the Harranian astronomers and mathematicians Thabit ibn Qurra (died 901) and al-Battani (died 929).

From the early tenth century on, the term 'Sabian' was applied to purported 'pagans' of all kinds, such as the ancient Egyptians and Greeks, or Buddhists. Ibn Wahshiyya (died c. 930) used the term for a type of Mesopotamian paganism that preserved elements of ancient Assyro-Babylonian religion.

Today in Iraq and Iran, the name 'Sabian' is normally applied to the Mandaeans, a modern ethno-religious group that follows the teachings of their prophet John the Baptist (Yahya ibn Zakariya). These Mandaean Sabians, whose most important religious ceremony is baptism, are monotheistic, and their holy book is known as the Ginza Rabba. Mandaean Sabian prophets include Adam, Seth, Noah, Shem and John the Baptist with Adam being the founder of the religion and John being the greatest and final prophet.

== Etymology ==
The etymology of the Arabic word Ṣābiʾ is disputed. According to one interpretation, it is the active participle of the Arabic root ṣ-b-ʾ ('to turn to'), meaning 'converts'. Another widely cited hypothesis, first proposed by Daniel Chwolsohn in 1856, is that it is derived from an Aramaic root meaning 'to dip' or 'to baptize'.

The interpretation as 'converts' was cited by various medieval Arabic lexicographers and philologists, and is supported by a tradition preserved by Ibn Hisham (died 834, editor of the earliest surviving biography of Muhammad) relating that the term ṣābiʾa was applied to Muhammad and the early Muslims by some of their enemies (perhaps by the Jews), who regarded them as having 'turned' away from the proper religion and towards heresy. As such, the term may have been reappropriated by early Muslims, first as a self-designation and then to refer to other people from a Jewish Christian background who 'turned' to the new revelations offered by Muhammad. In the context of the Quranic passages in which the term occurs, it may thus refer to all people who leave their faiths, finding fault in them, but who have yet to come to Islam. In this sense, the term ṣābiʾ would be similar in meaning to the term ḥanīf.

Understanding the term as a reference to 'dippers' or 'baptizers' fits best with those interpretations that identify the Quranic Sabians with Baptist sects like the Elchasaites or the Mandaeans. However, this etymology has also been used to explain Ibn Hisham's story about Muhammad and his followers being called 'Sabians', which would then be a reference to the ritual washing performed by Muslims before prayer, a practice resembling those of various Baptist sects.

Other etymologies have also been proposed. According to Judah Segal, the term referred to Ṣōbā, a Syriac name for Nisibis, a city in Upper Mesopotamia. It has also been related to Hebrew ṣābā', "[heavenly] host", implying star worshippers.

== Sabians of the Quran ==
=== In the Quran ===
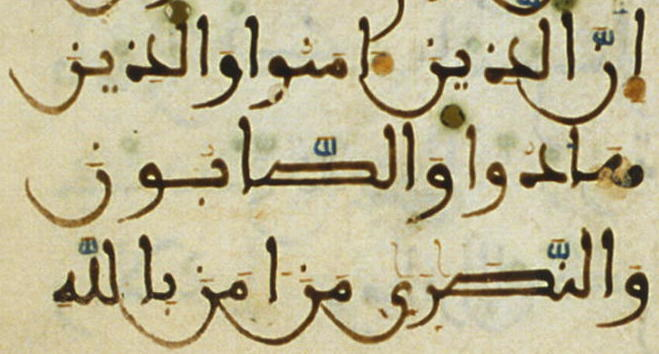
First part of Quran 5:69, Maghrebi manuscript, c. 1250–1350

The Quran briefly mentions the Sabians in three places: in Sūrat al-Baqara (2:62), in Sūrat al-Māʾida (5:69), and in Sūrat al-Ḥajj (22:17).

According to Sūrat al-Baqara, "surely those who believe, and those who are Jews, and the Christians, and the Sabians, whoever believes in Allah and the Last day and does good, they shall have their reward from their Lord, and there is no fear for them, nor shall they grieve."^{[Quran 2:62 (Translated by Shakir)]}

According to Sūrat al-Māʾida, "surely those who believe and those who are Jews and the Sabians and the Christians whoever believes in Allah and the last day and does good – they shall have no fear nor shall they grieve."^{[Quran 5:69 (Translated by Shakir)]}

According to Sūrat al-Ḥajj, "surely those who believe and those who are Jews and the Sabians and the Christians and the Magians and those who associate (others with Allah) – surely Allah will decide between them on the day of resurrection; surely Allah is a witness over all things."^{[Quran 22:17 (Translated by Shakir)]}

The first two verses have generally been interpreted to mean that the Sabians belonged to the People of the Book (ahl al-kitāb, cf. 5:68), just like the Jews, the Christians and, according to a few interpretations, the Zoroastrians (the 'Magians', al-majūs). (Note: Whether the 'Magians' listed in Quran 22:17 are to be understood as belonging to the People of the Book was a matter of dispute among medieval Muslim scholars. Islamic jurists generally granted Zoroastrians partial status as a People of the Book, though they disagreed on the extent to which legal privileges such as intermarriage with Muslims should be allowed (see Darrow 2003; Nasr et al. 2015, p. 834, verse 22:17).) However, neither of the three verses give any indication of who the Sabians might have been or what they may have believed. According to François de Blois, the fact that they are classified in the Quran among Abrahamic monotheists renders it unlikely that they were either the polytheists of Harran or the Mandaeans, the latter of whom defined themselves in opposition to the Abrahamic prophetic tradition.

=== In later sources ===
==== Islamic ====
In some Sunni hadiths, they are described as converts to Islam.

At the beginning of the Muslim conquest of Mesopotamia, the leader of the Mandaeans, Anush bar Danqa, appeared before Muslim authorities showing them a copy of the Ginza Rabba, the Mandaean holy book, and proclaiming the chief Mandaean prophet to be John the Baptist, who is also mentioned in the Quran by the name Yahya ibn Zakariya. Consequently, the Muslim caliphates provided them with acknowledgement as the Quranic Sabians and People of the Book.

Other classical Arabic sources include the Fihrist of ibn al-Nadim (c. 987), who mentions the Mogtasilah ("Mughtasila", or "self-ablutionists"), a sect of Sabians in southern Mesopotamia who are identified with the Mandaeans or Elcesaites.

Al-Biruni (writing at the beginning of the eleventh century CE) said that the '"real Sabians'" were "the remnants of the Jewish tribes who remained in Babylonia when the other tribes left it for Jerusalem in the days of Cyrus and Artaxerxes. According to E. S. Drower (1937) these remaining tribes ... adopted a system mixed up of Magism and Judaism.'

According to Abu Yusuf Absha al-Qadi, Caliph al-Ma'mun of Baghdad in 830 CE stood with his army at the gates of Harran and questioned the Harranians about what protected religion they belonged to. As they were neither Muslim, Christian, Jewish, nor Magian, the caliph told them they were non-believers. He said they would have to become Muslims, or adherents of one of the other religions recognized by the Quran, by the time he returned from his campaign against the Byzantines or he would kill them. The Harranians consulted with a lawyer, who suggested that they find their answer in the Quran II.59, which said that Sabians were tolerated. It was unknown what the sacred text intended by "Sabian," and so they took the name.

The pagan people of Harran identified themselves with the Sabians in order to fall under the protection of Islam. The Harranians may have identified themselves as Sabians in order to retain their religious beliefs. Multiple medieval sources state that the Harranian Sabians acknowledged Hermes Trismegistus as their prophet. Validation of Hermes as a prophet comes from his identification with Idris (i.e., Enoch) in Quran 19:57 and 21:85. This has often led modern scholars to think of the Harranian Sabians as Hermeticists, though there is in fact no further evidence for this.

Furthermore, this account of the Harranian Sabians does not fit with the existence of earlier records making reference to Sabians in Harran. Usamah ibn Ayd, writing before 770 CE (his year of death), already referred to a city of Sabians in the region where Harran lies. The jurist Abu Hanifa, who died in 767 CE, is recorded to have discussed the legal status of Harranian Sabians with two of his disciples.

Additionally, al-Masudi reported in his Meadows of Gold and Mines of Gems, that the Sabian religion was founded by a man named "Budhasaf" who lived during the reign of the mythical Persian king, Hushang, whereas Al-Biruni wrote that Budhasaf came forward in India after the 1st year of Tahmuras. However, he also narrates a story that Haran, the brother of Abraham, was the founder of the Sabian religion.

==== Other ====
The Jewish scholar Maimonides (1135 or 1138–1204) translated the book The Nabataean Agriculture, which he considered an accurate record of the beliefs of the Sabians. According to Maimonides, the Sabians believed in idolatrous practices "and other superstitions mentioned in the Nabatean Agriculture". He provided considerable detail about the pagan Sabians in his Guide for the Perplexed.

The Sabians are also mentioned in the literature of the Baháʼí Faith. These references are generally brief, describing two groups of Sabians: Those "who worship idols in the name of the stars, who believed their religion derived from Seth and Idris" [Harranian Sabians], and others "who believed in the son of Zechariah (John the Baptist) and didn't accept the advent of [Jesus Christ] the son of Mary" [Mandaeans]. 'Abdu'l-Bahá briefly describes Seth as one of the "sons of Adam". Bahá'u'lláh identifies Idris with Hermes Trismegistus in a tablet. He does not, however, specifically name Idris as the prophet of the Sabians. Sometimes referred to as Sabeans, this religious group has been mentioned in the Baha'i Faith among the many early religions of the previous dispensations. In Baha'i writing, `Abdu'l-Bahá' attributes the Sabeans as possibly being the source of some foundations to the science of logic.

=== Modern scholars ===
Chwolson (1856) differentiates between the pagan "pseudo-Sabians" of Harran and the real Sabians, which he identifies as the marsh Arabs of Iraq. The Caliph Mamun asked the pagan Harranians to choose a recognized religion, become Muslim, or die. They subsequently identified themselves with the Sabians. Chwolson also connected the Elcesaites with the Manicheans and with the Essenes.

The Syriac Christian Nicolas Siouffi, and later French Vice-Consul at Mosul, claimed to have identified 4,000 Sabians in the Mandaean population. Siouffi's work was well received by the Theosophist G.R.S. Mead, but scholars criticized the estimates and study.

A.H. Layard mentions in his travel diary meeting a "travelling silversmith" who was "Sabaean or Christian of St. John". He estimated around 300~400 families to live in Shooshtar and Basra at the time. He also mentioned the Sabians (spelled by Layard as Sabaeans) to be under oppression from Turkish and Persian authorities.

Gavin Maxwell, while travelling with explorer Wilfred Thesiger in the southern marshes of Iraq, records in his diary that the Sabians were "People of the Book". The marsh Arabs called them "Subbi". They had their own script and religious practices. He estimated their number as "perhaps ten thousand". They dressed in the manner of the Sunnis. They lived only near moving (rather than stagnant) marsh water. In the mid-1950s, they were considered skilled artisans in the area, to whom others turned for metalwork. The work they were principally known for outside Iraq was silverwork.

J. Hämeen-Anttila (2002, 2006) notes that in the marsh areas of Southern Iraq, there was a continuous tradition of Mandaean religion, and that there was another pagan, or 'Sabian', centre in the tenth-century Islamic world centred around Harran. These pagan Sabians are mentioned in the Nabataean corpus of Ibn Wahshiyya.

== Pagan Sabians ==
Among the various religious groups which in the 9th and 10th centuries came to be identified with the Sabians mentioned in the Quran, at least two groups were pagans. Moreover, both appear to have engaged in some kind of star worship.

=== Sabians of Harran ===
By far the most famous of these two are the Sabians of Harran, adherents of a Hellenized Semitic polytheistic religion that had managed to survive during the early Islamic period in the Upper Mesopotamian city of Harran. They were described by Syriac Christian heresiographers as star worshippers. Most of the scholars and courtiers working for the Abbasid and Buyid dynasties in Baghdad during the ninth–eleventh centuries who were known as 'Sabians' were either members of this Harranian religion or descendants of such members, most notably the Harranian astronomers and mathematicians Thabit ibn Qurra (died 901) and al-Battani (died 929). There has been some speculation on whether these Sabian families in Baghdad, on whom most of our information about the Harranian Sabians indirectly depends, may have practiced a different, more philosophically inspired variant of the original Harranian religion. However, apart from the fact that it contains traces of Babylonian and Hellenistic religion, and that an important place was taken by planets (to whom ritual sacrifices were made), little is known about Harranian Sabianism. They have been variously described by scholars as (neo)-Platonists, Hermeticists, or Gnostics, but there is no firm evidence for any of these identifications. (Note: On the Sabians of Harran, see further Dozy & de Goeje 1884; Margoliouth 1913; Tardieu 1986; Tardieu 1987; Peters 1990; Green 1992; Fahd 1960–2007; Strohmaier 1996; Genequand 1999; Elukin 2002; Stroumsa 2004; De Smet 2010.) Al-Biruni lists off some of the prophets the Sabians of Harran are said to have believed in: Aghādhīmūn, Wālīs, Pythagoras, Bābā, Sawar.

=== Lower Mesopotamian Sabians ===
Apart from the Sabians of Harran, there were also various religious groups living in the Mesopotamian Marshes who were called the 'Sabians of the Marshes' (Arabic: Ṣābiʾat al-baṭāʾiḥ). Though this name has often been understood as a reference to the Mandaeans, there was in fact at least one other religious group living in the marshlands of Southern Iraq. This group still practiced a polytheistic Babylonian religion or similar, in which Mesopotamian gods had already been venerated in the form of planets and stars since antiquity. According to Ibn al-Nadim, our only source for this specific group counted among the 'Sabians of the Marshes', they "follow the doctrines of the ancient Aramaeans [ʿalā maḏāhib an-Nabaṭ al-qadīm] and venerate the stars". However, there is also a large corpus of texts by Ibn Wahshiyya (died c. 930), most famously his Nabataean Agriculture, which describes at length the customs and beliefs — many of them going back to Mespotamian models — of Iraqi Sabians living in the Sawād.

== Contemporary Sabians ==
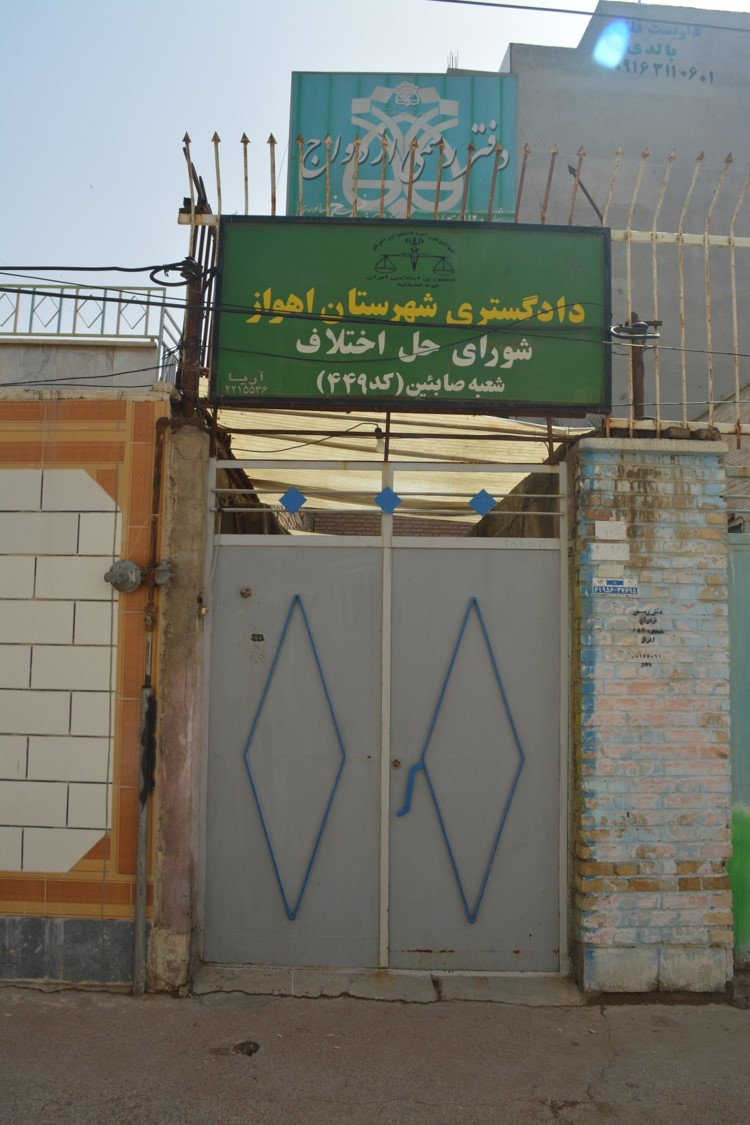
Mandaean Sabian court for marital dispute, Ahvaz, Iran (2015)

Today in Iraq and Iran, the Sabians are those that claim to follow the teachings of John the Baptist. They are Mandaean Sabians. They have been vulnerable to violence since the 2003 American invasion of Iraq and numbered fewer than 5,000 in Iraq in 2007. Before the invasion, the highest concentrations of Mandaeans were in Amarah, Nasiriyah and Basra. Besides these southern regions and Ahvaz in Iran, large numbers of Mandaeans were found in Baghdad, giving them easy access to the Tigris River. Today, they primarily live around Baghdad, where the high priest resides who conducts services and baptisms. Some have moved from Baghdad to Kurdistan where it is safer.

== See also ==
- Category:Sabian scholars from the Abbasid Caliphate
