= Hinduism and Judaism =

Among the oldest existing religions in the world

Hinduism and Judaism are among the oldest existing religions in the world. The two share some similarities and interactions throughout both the ancient and modern worlds.

== Theological similarities ==
Scholarly comparisons of Hinduism and Judaism were common during the Age of Enlightenment as part of arguments concerning the deistic worldview. Hananya Goodman states that Hinduism and Judaism have played an important role in European discussions of idolatry, spirituality, primitive theories of race, language, mythologies, etc.

Later Jewish scholars also compared Kabbalah with Indian religious and philosophical traditions. Rabbi and editor Asriel Günzig published a 1900 Hebrew essay often translated as "Kabbalah and Indian Philosophy", in Ha-Eshkol, in which he compared Kabbalah with Indian thought. Boaz Huss writes that Günzig drew on translations of the Upanishads, referred to Schopenhauer's high regard for the Vedas, and argued for a "wonderful resemblance" between Indian and Israelite religion.

Both religions were regarded by some scholars to be ethnic religions, and not promoting conversions. Adherents of both religions, however, are found across the world. Both religions share common elements in regard to a complicated system of laws, purity codes, and dietary restrictions, for defining their communities.

Judaism has been compared to Hinduism by new religious movement founder Rajneesh and Steve J. Rosen, an International Society for Krishna Consciousness adherent. Both cite the similarities between Brahmins and Jews who viewed themselves as "God's chosen people". Rosen adds that the former had a "community of priests" while the latter had a "Kingdom of Priests".

David Flusser says that the record of Abraham has many similarities with the story of Yajnavalkya from the Upanishads, stating that "One can easily discover parallels in the Upanishads to the Abraham legend".

American biologist Constantine Samuel Rafinesque (1783–1840), in his book The American Nations, discusses linguistic and traditional similarities between the two religions.

== Scriptures ==
Barbara Holdrege compared the role of scriptures in Brahmanical, Rabbinic Jewish, and Kabbalistic traditions, highlighting that both the Vedas and Torah are seen not just as texts, but as multileveled cosmic realities encompassing historical and transmundane dimensions. She adds further that sacred status, authority, and function of scripture in these traditions are to a certain extent shaped by these conceptions and thus such a study is essential for understanding the role of Veda and Torah as the paradigmatic signs of their respective traditions.

Judaism, notable for its monotheistic conception of God, has some similarities with those Hindu scriptures that are monotheistic, such as the Vedas.

Hindu sects hold a variety of beliefs about the nature and identity of God, ranging from a form of monotheism to polytheism, pantheism, and panentheism. According to the Mahabharata and some Vaishnavite Puranas, Narayana is the supreme deity. Vaishnavism considers Vishnu or Krishna to be the supreme God, while Shaivites consider Shiva to be the supreme god, keeping in mind the Agamas, certain Upanishads and the Pashupati seal; the latter being discovered amongst the remains of the Indus Valley Civilization.

In Judaism, God is an absolute one, indivisible and incomparable being who is the ultimate cause of all existence. In Hinduism, gods are considered to have similar statuses to another when distinct, being "aspects or manifestations of a single, transcendent god" or an "impersonal absolute".

Bernard Jackson points out the extent to which legal regulations, customs, and royal ordinances in Halakha in the Jewish tradition and Dharmaśāstra among Hindus are binding on members of their respective societies. Jackson adds that both Jewish and Hindu law evidence a great sensitivity to the interplay of local custom and authoritative law. He says that in both religions, the writing down of a collection of norms did not necessarily mean that all or even most norms were intended to be enforced, and that the laws connected with royal authority were not necessarily statutory. Wendy Doniger states that Hinduism and Judaism are alike in their tendency toward orthopraxy rather than orthodoxy.

== Relations ==
=== Historical ===
Ancient trade and cultural communication between India and the Levant is documented in the Periplus of the Erythraean Sea and the accounts surrounding the Queen of Sheba in the Hebrew Bible.

Bhavishya Purana is regarded by a number of scholars to have predicted Judaism's prophet Moses, and similar parallels are found in the Vedas.

The trade relations of both communities can be traced back to 1,000 BCE and earlier to the time of the Indus Valley Civilisation of the Indian subcontinent and the Babylonian culture of Middle East. A Buddhist story describes Indian merchants visiting Baveru (Babylonia) and selling peacocks for public display. Similar, earlier accounts describe monkeys exhibited to the public.

The Torah has also been helpful for understanding relations between these two traditions. Geographical analysis of Israel suggests that the authors of the Torah were talking about India, where the sale of animals such as monkeys and peacocks took place. Trade connections between India and Mediterranean Jewish communities continued, and later, the languages of these cultures started to share linguistic similarities.

=== Modern ===
Some of the leading figures in the field of Indology like Theodor Aufrecht, Theodor Goldstücker, Theodor Benfey, Charles Rockwell Lanman, Salomon Lefmann, Gustav Solomon Oppert, Betty Heimann etc. were of Jewish descent.

The world's first Jewish-Hindu interfaith leadership summit, led by the World Council of Religious Leaders, Hindu organisations in India and Jewish organisations in Israel, as well as the American Jewish Committee, was held in New Delhi in February 2007. The summit included the then Chief Rabbi of Israel Yona Metzger, the American Jewish Committee's International Director of Interreligious Affairs David Rosen, a delegation of chief rabbis from around the world, and Hindu leaders from India. During the summit, Rabbi Metzger stated:

Jews have lived in India for over 2,000 years and have never been discriminated against. This is something unparalleled in human history.

As both communities share a history of religious hatred, violence, persecution, discrimination, and forced conversions from common sources - namely Muslims and Christians, the creation of Israel as a Jewish state by Zionists was supported by some Hindu nationalists who also wanted to make undivided India a Hindu state, most notably M. S. Golwalkar, who said:

The Jews had maintained their race, religion, culture and language; and all they wanted was their natural territory to complete their Nationality.

Swami Dayananda recognized the similarities of both religions and pointed to the belief in One supreme being, non-conversion, oral recitation of the Veda and the Torah, and the special importance of peace and non-violence. Savarupananda Saraswatiji explained that "Both the Hindu and Jewish communities have a lot in common, we need to discover and nurture these areas for the benefit of millions of people." This meeting included Rabbis such as Daniel Sperber, Yona Metzger, and others. They affirmed a number of points, one of which was:

Their respective traditions teach that there is one supreme being who is the ultimate reality, who has created this world in its blessed diversity and who has communicated Divine ways of action for humanity, for different people in different times and places.

In 2008, a second Hindu-Jewish summit took place in Jerusalem. Included in the summit was a meeting between Hindu groups and then Israeli President Shimon Peres, where the importance of a strong Israeli-Indian relationship was discussed. The Hindu delegation also met with Israeli politicians Isaac Herzog and Majalli Whbee. Hindu groups visited and said their prayers at the Western Wall, and also paid their respects to Holocaust victims. In 2009, a smaller Hindu-Jewish interfaith meeting organized by the World council of Religious Leaders, Hindu American Foundation and the American Jewish Committee was held in New York and Washington. Hindu and Jewish representatives gave presentations, and participants wore lapel pins combining the Israeli, Indian, and American flags.

About 5,000 Jews reside in India today. The Bnei Menashe are a group of more than 9,000 Jews from the Indian states Manipur and Mizoram who have resided in India since as early as 8th century BCE. On 31 March 2005, Sephardi Rabbi, Shlomo Amar, one of Israel's two chief rabbis, accepted the Bnei Menashe's claim of being one of the ten lost tribes considering their devotion to Judaism. His decision was significant because it paved the way for all members of Bnei Menashe to enter Israel under Israel's Law of Return. In the past two decades, some 1,700 Bnei Menashe members have moved to Israel. Israel has reversed the policy of immigration for the remaining 7,200 Bnei Menashe.

There are some who profess a belief in both religions: they regard themselves as Hinjew, a portmanteau of Hindu and Jew.

Many Jews take vipassana and yoga as a supplement to traditional Hasidic musical meditation and dynamic meditation.

According to a report by the Pew Research Center conducted in the US, of all religious groups, Hindus and Jews remain the most successful at retaining their adherents and are the two most educated groups.

In recent years, observers have noted increasing interactions and expressions of mutual support between some proponents of Hindutva and Zionism, particularly in online spaces. Political analysts have discussed parallels between the Bharatiya Janata Party and Israel's Likud, though interpretations of these similarities vary and remain debated. During the tenure of Narendra Modi, relations between India and Israel have strengthened across areas such as defense, technology and agriculture. India's voting patterns in international forums including at the United Nations Human Rights Council, have at times reflected a shift in approach compared to earlier governments. Similarly, under Benjamin Netanyahu, Israel has maintained close ties with India and has generally refrained from publicly criticizing India's internal policies. Analysts attribute this mainly to strategic, diplomatic and political considerations, though views differ on the extent to which ideological alignment plays a role.

Public statements by political and religious figures on both sides have occasionally drawn attention and criticism, Uttar Pradesh Chief Minister Yogi Adityanath faced criticism for remarks expressing support for Israel's military actions against Hamas, which he compared to the Taliban, and for accusing opposition parties of "selective activism". During a public address in Israel, Modi described Israel as a "fatherland" and India as the "motherland" in remarks directed towards Indian Jews who consider Israel as their homeland; commentators and media reports offered differing interpretations of the statement.

== See also ==
- History of the Jews in India
- India–Israel relations
- Indian Jews in Israel
- Jewish Buddhist
