= Islamic–Hindu relations =

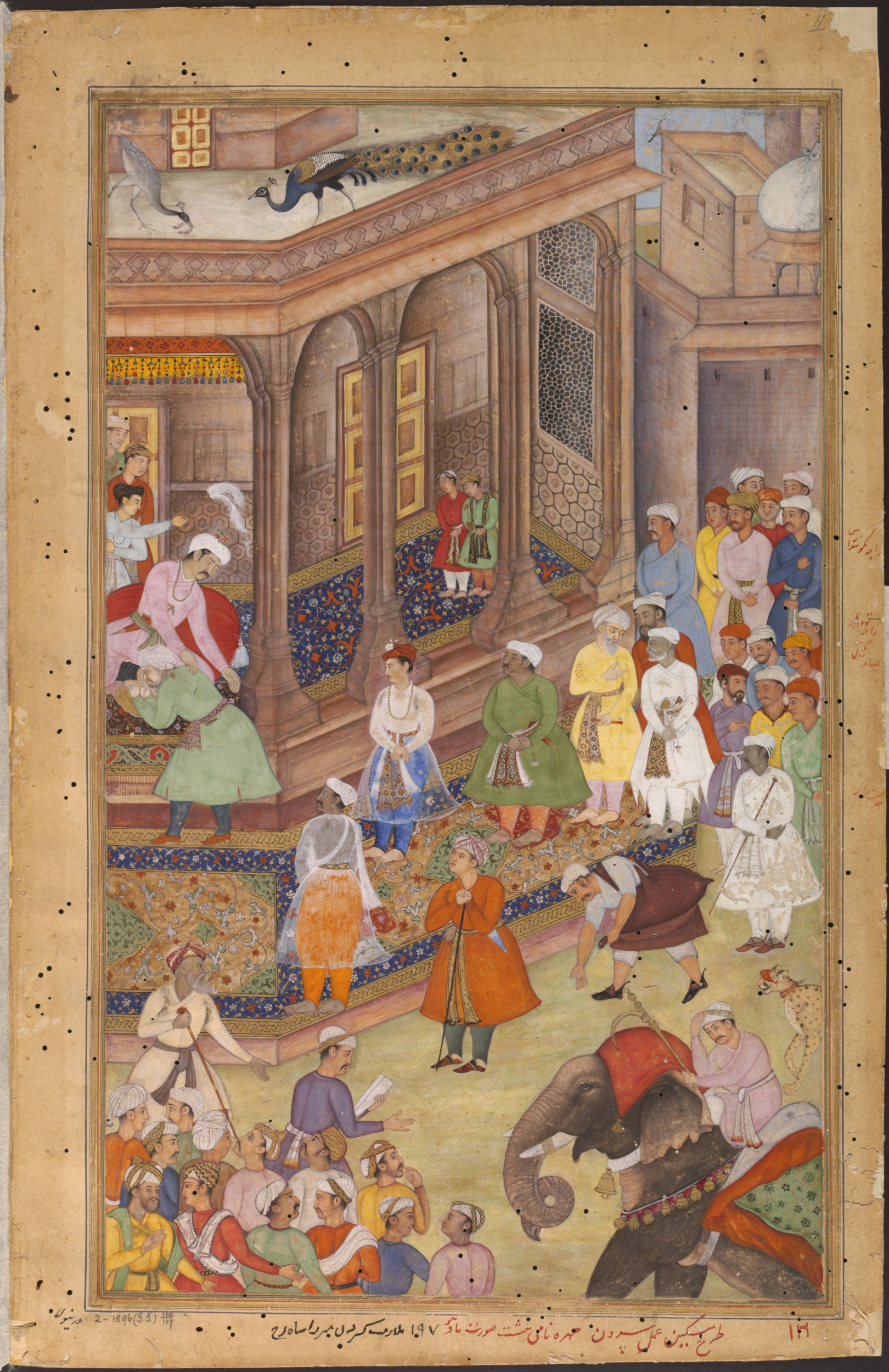
Akbar greeting Hindu Rajput rulers and other nobles at court. He attempted to foster communal harmony between Hindus and Muslims.

Islam and Hinduism share some ritual practices, such as fasting and pilgrimage, but their views differ on various aspects. There are also hundreds of shared ritual spaces, called dargahs (literally, "doorway" or "threshold"), for Hindus and Muslims. These mark shrines for revered Muslim (frequently Sufi) leaders and are visited by both Muslims and Hindus. Their interaction has witnessed periods of cooperation and syncretism, and periods of religious discrimination, intolerance, and violence. As a religious minority in India, Muslims are part of Indian culture and have lived alongside Hindus for over 13 centuries.

== History ==
Interactions between Muslims and Hindus began in the 7th century, after the advent of Islam in the Arabian Peninsula. These interactions were mainly by trade throughout the Indian Ocean. Historically, these interactions formed contrasting patterns in northern and southern India. While there is a history of conquest and domination in the north, Hindu-Muslim relations in Kerala and Tamil Nadu have been peaceful. However, historical evidence has shown that violence had existed by the year 1700 AD.

=== Under the Mughal Empire ===
In the 16th century, the Mughal Empire was established. Mughal religious policy varied between emperors. Akbar abolished Jizya and accommodated Hindu, Jain, Parsi, and Christian religious figures. Later rulers adopted more restrictive policies: Shah Jahan restricted the construction of new Hindu temples and Aurangzeb prohibited the construction and repair of certain Hindu temples, reimposed Jizya and ordered the destruction of many prominent temples. During the Mughal era, the construction of grand monuments such as the Taj Mahal and the Red Fort took place. While the Mughals promoted religious harmony and cultural advancements and nurtured Hindu scholars, poets, and artists, facilitating a dynamic cultural interchange that enriched both Islamic and Hindu traditions, there were instances of religious conflicts between the Mughals and the Rajput over control of territories. Aurangzeb was criticized for his policies of religious intolerance towards Hindus.

=== In British India ===
During the 18th to 20th centuries, India was ruled by the British, who introduced a policy of divide and rule to maintain their control over the country. The British also introduced a system of separate electorates, which further exacerbated the divide between the Hindu and Muslim communities. The First Indian War of Independence in 1857 was a major uprising against British rule in India. The rebellion was fueled by a range of grievances, including economic exploitation, social and religious discrimination, and political oppression. While the rebellion was not solely based on religious tensions between Hindus and Muslims, these tensions did play a role in fueling the conflict. During the rebellion, there were instances of both Muslim and Hindu soldiers and civilians fighting together against the British, as well as instances of conflict between the two communities.

== In popular culture ==
=== Music ===
There have been instances of syncretic cooperation on music with Islamic and Hindu themes. For example, the national poet of Bangladesh, Kazi Nazrul Islam, wrote many Islamic devotional songs for mainstream Bengali folk music. He also explored Hindu devotional music by composing Shyama Sangeet, Durga Vandana, Sarswati Vandana, bhajans and kirtans, often merging Islamic and Hindu values. Nazrul's poetry and songs explored the philosophy of Islam and Hinduism.

== See also ==
- Alberuni's India
- Anti-Mosque campaign in India
- Din-i Ilahi
- Legend of Cheraman Perumals § The story of Tajuddeen
- Divisions of the world in Islam
- Hindu–Muslim unity
- Hinduism and other religions
- Islam and other religions
- Islam in South Asia
- Sufism in India
- Violence against Muslims in India
- Category:Persecution of Hindus by Muslims
- Category:Anti-Hindu violence in Pakistan

== Bibliography ==
Relations

- Friedrichs, Jörg (2018), Hindu–Muslim Relations: What Europe Might Learn from India, Taylor & Francis, ISBN 978-0-429-86207-6
- Jain, Meenakshi (2010), Parallel Pathways: Essays on Hindu-Muslim Relations 1707–1857, Konark Publishers, ISBN 9788122007831
- Sikand, Yoginder (2004), Muslims in India Since 1947: Islamic Perspectives on Inter-Faith Relations, Routledge, ISBN 978-0415314862

Islam in South Asia

- Holt, Peter M. (1977), Peter Malcolm Holt; Ann K. S. Lambton; Bernard Lewis (eds.), The Cambridge History of Islam (New ed.), Cambridge University Press, ISBN 978-0521291378
- Khalidi, Omar (2009), Shiping Hua (ed.), Islam and democratization in Asia, Cambria Press, ISBN 978-1604976328
- Metcalf, Barbara D. (2009), Barbara D. Metcalf (ed.), Islam in South Asia in Practice, Princeton University Press, ISBN 978-0691044200

Communal violence

- Wilkinson, Steven I. (2006), Votes and Violence: Electoral Competition and Ethnic Riots in India, Cambridge University Press, ISBN 978-0521536059
- Reference, Blackwell (1999). Townson, Duncan (ed.). "Indian communal massacres (1946–7)". Blackwell Reference. doi:10.1111/b.9780631209379.1999.x. ISBN 9780631209379.
- Markovits, Claude. "India from 1900 to 1947". Mass Violence.Org.
- D'Costa, Bina (2010), Nationbuilding, Gender and War Crimes in South Asia, Routledge, ISBN 978-0415565660
- Ghosh, Partha S. (2004), Ranabir Samaddar (ed.), Peace Studies: An Introduction To the Concept, Scope, and Themes, SAGE, ISBN 978-0761996606
- Hussain, Monirul (2009), Sibaji Pratim Basu (ed.), The Fleeing People of South Asia: Selections from Refugee Watch, Anthem, p. 261, ISBN 978-8190583572
- Berglund, Henrik (2011), Galina Lindquist; Don Handelman (eds.), Religion, Politics, and Globalization: Anthropological Approaches, Berghahn, p. 105, ISBN 978-1845457716
- Smith, Glenn (2005), Asvi Warman Adam; Dewi Fortuna Anwar (eds.), Violent Internal Conflicts in Asia Pacific: Histories, Political Economies, and Policies, Yayasan Obor, ISBN 9789794615140
- Pandey, Gyanendra (2005), Routine violence: nations, fragments, histories, Stanford University Press, ISBN 978-0804752640
- Ghassem-Fachandi, Parvis (2012), Pogrom in Gujarat: Hindu Nationalism and Anti-Muslim Violence in India, Princeton University Press, p. 2, ISBN 978-0691151779
- Metcalf, Barbara (2013), Deana Heath; Chandana Mathur (eds.), Communalism and Globalization in South Asia and its Diaspora, Routledge, ISBN 978-0415857857

General

- Brown, J. M. (1994), Modern India: The Origins of an Asian Democracy, The Short Oxford History of the Modern World (2nd ed.), Oxford University Press, ISBN 978-0-19-873113-9
- Chandra, Satish (2007). History of Medieval India. New Delhi: Orient Longman. ISBN 978-81-250-3226-7.
- Chua, Amy (2007). Day of Empire: How Hyperpowers Rise to Global Dominance – and Why They Fall. Doubleday. ISBN 978-0-385-51284-8.
- Fowler, Jeaneane D. (2002), Perspectives of Reality: An Introduction to the Philosophy of Hinduism, Sussex Academic Press, ISBN 978-1898723936
- Metcalf, Barbara D.; Metcalf, Thomas R. (2006), A Concise History of Modern India (2nd ed.), Cambridge University Press, ISBN 978-0-521-68225-1
- Madani, Mohsen Saeidi (1993). Impact of Hindu culture on Muslims. New Delhi: M D Publications. ISBN 978-81-85880-15-0.
