= Ahurani =

Ahurani is the Avestan language name of a Zoroastrian (class of) divinity associated with "the waters" (āpō). In scripture, the expression ahurani appears both in the singular and in the plural, and may - subject to context - either denote a specific divinity named Ahurani, or a class of divinities that are ahuranis.

The Avestan feminine suffix -ani denotes "companion, wife, mate", hence ahurani means "partner of ahura." The ahura of the name may or may not be a reference to Ahura Mazda or to the other Ahuras. Following recent scholarship (see Ahura for details), it is now generally supposed that there was once been a divinity whose proper name was *Ahura, and from whom the various ahuras of the Avesta receive this epithet.

== In scripture ==
=== In the Yasna Haptanghaiti ===
In the Yasna Haptanghaiti, the ahuranis are invoked in the plural, as "companions of the ahura." In these verses of great antiquity and linguistically as old as the Gathas, they are also said to be "created by Ahura Mazda" (Yasna 38.4).

=== In the Younger Avesta ===
In the Younger Avesta, the expression appears in the singular: Ahurani bears gifts of health, prosperity, renown, and for the well-being of the soul (Yasna 68.3-4). In Yasna 68.11, the devotee asks Ahurani for a long life and a welcome in the radiant abode of the righteous (i.e. paradise, cf. ashavan).

In Yasna 68, which is a "hidden" (since not explicitly dedicated to them) Yasht, the "ahuric one of (the) Ahura," appears to represent water in all its variations: rivers, wells, lakes, seas, snow and rain (Yasna 68.6). As such, the single divinity appears to be synonymous with the *apas, the group of Indo-Iranian divinities of the waters.

In other verses, the waters are themselves revered as the ahuranis (Yasna 38.3). The ahuranis enlighten thought, speech and actions (Yasna 68.4). This is in line with the Indo-Iranian tradition of identifying water with wisdom (Avestan: mazda). The ahuranis as described as bringers of fertility and peace. In Yasna 68.1-2 (cf. Ab-Zohr, "offering to water"), the celebrant priest offers the ahuranis a libation of milk and butter (representing animal creation).

== In tradition ==
Ahurani(s) are not included in any list of yazatas, nor do they/does she have a day-name dedication in the Zoroastrian calendar. This may be because in later Zoroastrianism Aredvi Sura Anahita dominates as divinity of the waters, and it is to her that the hymn to the waters (the Aban Yasht) is dedicated.

There appear to be historic parallels between the Avestan ahuranis and the RigVedic varunanis, the "wives of Varuna." These parallels are one of the points of comparison for the theory that Ahura Mazda and Varuna both descend from a common predecessor (see Ahura Mazda for details).

== Bibliography ==
- Boyce, Mary (1975), A History of Zoroastrianian, Vol. I, Leiden/Köln: Brill p. 51.
- Boyce, Mary (1983), "Aban", Encyclopaedia Iranica, vol. 1, New York: Routledge and Kegan Paul p. 58.
- Dhalla, Maneckji Nusservanji (1938), History of Zoroastrianism, New York: OUP pp. 230–231.
- Jordan, Michael (2002), "Ahurani", Encyclopedia of Gods, London: Kyle Cathie
- Schlerath, Bernfried (1983), "Ahurānī", Encyclopaedia Iranica, vol. 1, New York: Routledge and Kegan Paul p. 688.
