= Aban =

Avestan-language term for "the waters"

Apas (/ˈɑːpəs, æp-/, Avestan: āpas) is the Avestan language term for "the waters", which, in its innumerable aggregate states, is represented by the Apas, the hypostases of the waters.

Āb (plural Ābān) is the Middle Persian-language form.

== Introduction ==
"To this day reverence for water is deeply ingrained in Zoroastrians, and in orthodox communities offerings are regularly made to the household well or nearby stream." The ape zaothra ceremony—the culminating rite of the Yasna service (which is in turn the principal act of worship)—is literally for the "strengthening of the waters."

Avestan apas (from singular āpō) is grammatically feminine, and the Apas are female. The Middle Persian equivalents are ābān/Ābān (alt: āvān/Āvān), from which Parsi Gujarati āvā/Āvā (in religious usage only) derive.

The Avestan common noun āpas corresponds exactly to Vedic Sanskrit āpas, and both derive from the same proto-Indo-Iranian word, stem *ap- "water", cognate with the British river Avon. In both Avestan and Vedic Sanskrit texts, the waters—whether as waves or drops, or collectively as streams, pools, rivers or wells—are represented by the Apas, the group of divinities of the waters. The identification of divinity with element is complete in both cultures : in the Rig Veda the divinities are wholesome to drink, in the Avesta the divinities are good to bathe in.

As also in the Indian religious texts, the waters are considered a primordial element. In Zoroastrian cosmogony, the waters are the second creation, after that of the sky. Aside from Apas herself/themselves, no less than seven Zoroastrian divinities are identified with the waters: all three Ahuras (Mazda, Mithra, Apam Napat), two Amesha Spentas (Haurvatat, Armaiti), and two lesser Yazatas (Aredvi Sura Anahita and Ahurani).

Abans, a crater on Ariel, one of the moons of Uranus, is named after aban.

== In scripture ==
In the seven-chapter Yasna Haptanghaiti, which interrupts the sequential order of the Gathas and is linguistically as old as the Gathas themselves, the waters are revered as the Ahuranis, wives of the Ahura (Yasna 38.3). Although not otherwise named, Boyce associates this Ahura with Apam Napat (middle Persian: Burz Yazad), another divinity of waters.

In Yasna 38, which is dedicated "to the earth and the sacred waters", apas/Apas is not only necessary for nourishment, but is considered the source of life ("you that bear forth", "mothers of our life"). In Yasna 2.5 and 6.11, apas/Apas is "Mazda-made and holy".

In the Aban Yasht (Yasht 5), which is nominally dedicated to the waters, veneration is directed specifically at Aredvi Sura Anahita, another divinity identified with the waters, but originally representing the "world river" that encircled the earth (see In tradition, below). The merger of the two concepts "probably" came about due to prominence given to Aredvi Sura during the reign of Artaxerxes II (r. 404-358 BCE) and subsequent Achaemenid emperors. Although (according to Lommel and Boyce) Aredvi is of Indo-Iranian origin and cognate with Vedic Saraswati, during the 5th century BCE Aredvi was conflated with a Semitic divinity with similar attributes, from whom she then inherited additional properties.

In other Avesta texts, the waters are implicitly associated with [Spenta] Armaiti (middle Persian Spendarmad), the Amesha Spenta of the earth (this association is properly developed in Bundahishn 3.17). In Yasna 3.1, the eminence of Aban is reinforced by additionally assigning guardianship to another Amesha Spenta Haurvatat (middle Persian: (K)hordad).

== In tradition ==
According to the Bundahishn ('Original Creation', an 11th- or 12th-century text), aban was the second of the seven creations of the material universe, the lower half of everything.

In a development of a cosmogonical view already alluded to in the Vendidad (21.15), aban is the essence of a "great gathering place of the waters" (Avestan: Vourukasha, middle Persian: Varkash) upon which the world ultimately rested. The great sea was fed by a mighty river (proto-Indo-Iranian: *harahvati, Avestan: Aredvi Sura, middle Persian: Ardvisur). Two rivers, one to the east and one to the west, flowed out of it and encircled the earth (Bundahishn 11.100.2, 28.8) where they were then cleansed by Puitika (Avestan, middle Persian: Putik), the tidal sea, before flowing back into the Vourukasha.

In the Zoroastrian calendar, the tenth day of the month is dedicated to the (divinity of) waters (Siroza 1.10), under whose protection that day then lies. Additionally, Aban is also the name of the eighth month of the year of the Zoroastrian calendar (Bundahishn 1a.23-24), as well as that of the Iranian calendar of 1925, which follows Zoroastrian month-naming conventions. It might be the precursor of the holy month of Sha'aban in the Hijri calendar. Sha'aban meaning the Zoroastrian name-day feast of Abanagan, also known as the Aban Ardvisur Jashan by Indian Zoroastrians (see: Parsis), is celebrated on the day that the day-of-month and month-of-year dedications intersect, that is, on the tenth day of the eighth month. The celebration is accompanied by a practice of offering sweets and flowers to a river or the sea.

From among the flowers associated with the yazatas, aban's is the water-lily (Bundahishn 27.24).

== See also ==
- Temple of Anahita, Istakhr
- Temple of Anahita, Kangavar
- Qadamgah (ancient site)
- Minar (Firuzabad)

== Bibliography ==
- Boyce, Mary (1975). History of Zoroastrianism, Vol. I. Leiden: Brill. ISBN 978-90-04-10474-7.
- Boyce, Mary (1982). History of Zoroastrianism, Vol. II. Leiden: Brill. ISBN 978-90-04-06506-2.
- Boyce, Mary (1983). "Aban". Encyclopaedia Iranica. Vol. I. New York: Mazda Pub. p. 58.
- Lommel, Herman (1927). Die Yašts des Awesta. Göttingen–Leipzig: Vandenhoeck & Ruprecht/JC Hinrichs.
- Lommel, Herman (1954). "Anahita-Sarasvati". Asiatica: Festschrift Friedrich Weller Zum 65. Geburtstag. Leipzig: Otto Harrassowitz. pp. 405–413.
- Girshman, Roman (1962). Persian art, Parthian and Sassanian dynasties. London: Golden Press.
- Aban Yasht, as translated by James Darmesteter in
  Müller, Friedrich Max, ed. (1883). SBE, Vol. 23. Oxford: OUP.
- Yasna 38 (to the earth and the sacred waters), as translated by Lawrence Heyworth Mills in
  Müller, Friedrich Max, ed. (1887). SBE, Vol. 31. Oxford: OUP.
- Anklesaria, Behramgore Tehmuras (1956). The Greater Bundahishn.
