= Proto-Indo-Iranian religion =

Religion of the Indo-Iranian peoples

Proto-Indo-Iranian religion was the religion of the Indo-Iranian peoples and includes topics such as the mythology, legendry, folk tales, and folk beliefs of early Indo-Iranian culture. Reconstructed concepts include the universal force *Hṛta- (Sanskrit rta, Avestan asha), the sacred plant and drink *sawHma- (Sanskrit Soma, Avestan Haoma) and gods of social order such as *mitra- (Sanskrit Mitra, Avestan and Old Persian Mithra, Miϑra) and *bʰaga- (Sanskrit Bhaga, Avestan and Old Persian Baga). Proto-Indo-Iranian religion is an archaic offshoot of Indo-European religion.

== Origins and development ==
Indo-Iranian languages include three subgroups: the Indo-Aryan languages (including the Dardic languages), the Iranian languages (east and west), and the Nuristani languages. From these various and dispersed cultures, a set of common ideas may be reconstructed from which a common, unattested proto-Indo-Iranian source may be deduced.

=== Relationship to Proto-Indo-European religion ===
When Vedic texts were the oldest surviving evidence of early Indo-European-speaking peoples, it was assumed that these texts preserved aspects of Proto-Indo-European culture with particular accuracy. Many ethnologists hoped to unify Indo-Iranian, Celtic, Norse, Greek, Germanic and Roman into a Proto-Indo-European religion. Max Müller believed that Indo-Iranian religion began as sun worship. Georges Dumézil stressed the tripartite social system of Indo-European religion and society. Later scholarship has moved away from considering all these religions near-identical.

=== Development ===
Some beliefs developed in different ways as cultures separated and evolved. For example, the word 'daeva,' which appears in the Avesta, also bears a linguistic relationship to the Sanskrit word 'deva,' referring to one of the principal classes of gods, as well as other related words throughout the Indo-European traditions. Indra, the greatest of the devas from Vedic literature, is often listed in Zoroastrian texts as one of the greatest of the evil forces, sometimes second only to Angra Mainyu himself. In the traditional Zoroastrian confession of faith as recorded in the Avesta, the rejection of the daevas is one of the most significant qualifiers for a follower of the tradition, alongside worshipping Ahura Mazda and following the teachings of Zarathustra. Similarly, the parallels between the malevolent Vedic Asuras and benevolent Zoroastrian Ahuras are particularly obvious and striking.Varuna, the most powerful of the Asuras, does not directly correspond to Ahura Mazda but shares several traits in common with him, particularly in terms of his role as king among the lesser gods and arbiter of law and morality among mortals. Even as Ahura Mazda rules by and upholds asha, the cosmic moral order, in the Avesta, so too do Varuna and the Asuras uphold the analogous concept of rta in the Vedas.

Additionally, the Avestan *Haraxvaitī Ārəduuī Sūrā Anāhitā is a 'composite' of Sarasvati and an Elamite goddess associated with fertility. In the Rig-Veda (6,61,5–7) Sarasvati battles a serpent called Vritra, who has hoarded all of the Earth's water. In contrast, in early portions of the Avesta, Iranian *Harahvati is the world-river that flows down from the mythical central Mount Hara. But *Harahvati does no battle — she is blocked by an obstacle (Avestan for obstacle: vərəϑra) placed there by Angra Mainyu.

=== Contemporary traces ===
The pre-Islamic religion of the Nuristani people and extant religion of the Kalash people is significantly influenced by the original religion of the Indo-Iranians, though mostly infused with accretions developed locally from Hinduism.

== Cognate terms ==
By way of the comparative method, Indo-Iranian philologists, a variety of historical linguist, have proposed reconstructions of entities, locations, and concepts with various levels of security in early Indo-Iranian folklore and mythology (reconstructions are indicated by the presence of an asterisk). The present section includes both reconstructed forms and proposed motifs from the Proto-Indo-Iranian period, generally associated with the Sintashta culture (2050–1900 BCE).

The following is a list of cognate terms that may be gleaned from comparative linguistic analysis of the Rigveda and Avesta. Both collections are from the period after the proposed date of separation (ca. 2nd millennium BCE) of the Proto-Indo-Iranians into their respective Indic Iranian branches.

=== Divine beings ===
Proto-Indo-Iranian reconstruction	Indo-Aryan	Iranian	Mitanni	Etymology	Notes
*Háǰʰiš	Ahi	Aži	–		–
*Aryamā́	Skt Aryaman	Av. Airiiaman	–		–
*Bʰagás	Skt Bhaga	OPers. *Baga (Note: The word baga is attested once in Old Avestan (possibly, but its interpretation remains unclear), and about ten times in the Young Avesta: baɣa- appears as an epithet for Ahura Mazda, the Moon and Miθra, while a compound hu-baɣa- refers to female deities.)	–		OPers. *Baga is inferred from Bāgayādi, month of the feast *Bagayāda- ('worshiping Baga = Mithra'). The etymology indicates a societal deity that distributes wealth and prosperity. Slavic bog ('god') and bogátyj ('rich') are generally seen as loanwords from Iranian.
*Ćarwa	Skt Śarva	YAv. Sauruua	–	Perhaps related to ToB śer(u)we, ToA śaru 'hunter'.	Probably meaning 'hunter' (cf. Khot. hasirä 'quarry, hunted beast', Oss. suryn 'to chase, hunt', syrd 'wild beast'). An epithet of Rudra or Śiva in Sanskrit. Name of one the daēuua (demons) in Young Avestan.
*Dyauš	Skt Dyáuṣ	OAv. diiaoš	–	From PIE *dyēus, the daylight-sky god.	Meaning 'heaven, daylight sky'. Name of the inherited Proto-Indo-European sky-god (cf. Hitt. šīuš, Grk Zeus, Lat. Jove) See Dyēus for further information.
*Hagníš	Skt Agni	YAv. Dāšt-āɣni		From PIE *h₁n̥gʷnis, the fire as an active force.	Name of the inherited Proto-Indo-European fire-god (cf. Lith. Ugnis, Alb. enjte). See H_{1}n̥gʷnis for further information.
*Hāpam-nápāts	Skt Apā́m nápāt	YAv. apᶏm napāt	–	From PIE *h_{2}ep- ('water') and *h_{2}nepot- ('grandson, descendant').	Meaning 'Grandsons of the Waters'. See Apam Napat for further information.
*Haramati	Skt Arámati	Av. Ārmaiti	–	No known IE cognate.	Goddess of obedience and piety. Cf. Skt arámanas ('obedient') and Av. ārmaiti ('piety, devotion').
*HatHarwan	Skt Átharvan	YAv. Āθrauuan	–	Perhaps a borrowing from a Central Asian language (cf. ToA atär, ToB etre 'hero').	Name of a primordial priest. The Sanskrit cognate is the name of the primordial priest, while the Young Avestan form designates the first social class (i.e. the priests). Scholars have rendered the stem *HatHar- as a 'religious-magical fluid' or 'magical potency'.
*Hwi(H)waswant	Skt Vivásvant	YAv. Vīuuanhvant	–	From PIE *h_{2}ues- 'dawn'.	Meaning 'morning dawn'. Father of *YamHa (see below). Cf. Skt vaivasvatá and Av. vīuuaŋhuša- ('descending from Vivasvant').
(?) *Wr̥trás	Skt Vṛtrá	YAv. Vǝrǝθraɣna	–	No known IE cognate.	*wr̥trás means 'defence' (the original meaning may have been 'cover'). Skt Vṛtrá is the name of a demon slain by Indra, often depicted as a cobra. YAv. Vǝrǝθraɣna, meaning 'breaking of defence, victory', is the name of a god. Cf. also Middle Persian Wahrām ('war god, god of victory'). The Arm. god Vahagn is a loanword from Iranian.
*Hušā́s	Skt Uṣás	OAv. Ušå	–	From PIE *h₂éws-ōs, the Dawn-goddess.	Name of the dawn-goddess. See H₂éwsōs for further information.
*Índras	Skt Índra	YAv. Indra	Mit. Indara	No known IE cognate.	–
*Krćānu ~ *Krćāni	Skt Kṛśā́nu	YAv. Kərəsāni	–	No known IE cognate.	Divine being associated with the Soma. In Sanskrit, the divine archer that guards the celestial Soma; in Young Avestan, name of a hostile king driven away by Haoma.
*Mánuš	Skt Manu	Av. *Manūš	–	From PIE *Manu- ('Man', 'ancestor of humankind'; cf. Germ. Mannus).	Av. *Manūš.čiθra ('image of Manuš') is inferred from Old Persian Manūščihr, the name of a high priest.
*Mitrás	Skt Mitrá	Av. Miθra	Mit. Mitra		See Mitra.
	Skt Nā́satyā	Av. Nā̊ŋhaiθya	Mit. Našattiya	Probably from PIE *nes- ('save, heal'; cf. Goth. nasjan).	Skt Nā́satyā is another name for the Aśvínā ('horse-possessors'); Nā̊ŋhaiθya is the name of a demon in the Zoroastrian religious system. According to scholar Douglas Frame, "the Iranian singular suggests that in Common Indo-Iranian the twins’ dual name also occurred in the singular to name one twin in opposition to the other". See Divine Twins.
*Pr̥tHwíH	Skt Pṛth(i)vī́	YAv. ząm pərəθβīm	–	From PIE *pleth₂wih₁ 'the broad one'.	Name of the deified earth. The Sanskrit poetic formula kṣā́m ... pṛthivī́m ('broad earth') is identical to YAv. ząm pərəθβīm (id.) See Dʰéǵʰōm for further information.
*PuHšā́	Skt Pisán	–	–	From PIE *p(e)h_{2}uson (cf. Grk Πάων < *pausōn).	Name of a herding-god, protector of roads, inspector of creatures.
*Sušna	Skt Śúsna	Sh. sāɣ(d)	–	From PIE ḱues-.	Name of a malevolent being. Proto-Iranian *sušnā- is inferred from Sh. sāɣ̌(d) ('big snake, dragon').
*Tritá	Skt Tritá	YAv. θrita	–	From PIE trito 'third'.	Mythical hero; one of the first preparers of the Soma.
	Skt Váruṇa	Av. *Vouruna(?)	Mit. Aruna		The Indo-Iranian ancestry is supported by Mitanni Aruna. The Avestan *Vouruna is postulated as the form the god would have taken in Iran, perhaps later replaced by Ahura Mazdā or Apam Napat.
*Ućan	Skt Uśánā	YAv. Usan	–	Probably a non-IE name based on the same root as *ućig- ('sacrificer').	Name of a sage.
*HwaHyúš and *HwáHatas	Skt Vāyú and Vā́ta	OAv. Vaiiu and Vāta	–	From PIE *h_{2}ueh_{1}iu and *h_{2}ueh_{1}nto.	Gods of winds.
*YámHas	Skt Yamá	OAv. yə̃ma- YAv. Yima	–	From PIE *imH-o 'twin'.	Meaning 'twin'; inherited from Proto-Indo-European (cf. Old Norse Ymir, the primeval giant). In Indo-Iranian, name of the mythical primeval man, first presser of the Soma, and son of the god *Hui(H)uasuant . Cognate to the Indic goddess Yamuna, a deified river. See Indo-European cosmogony for further information.

=== Locations ===
Proto-Indo-Iranian reconstruction	Indo-Aryan	Iranian	Etymology	Notes
*Háćmā	Skt áśman	YAv. asman	From PIE *h₂éḱmōn, 'stone, stone-made weapon; heavenly vault of stone'.	Skt áśman means 'stone, rock, sling-stone, thunderbolt', YAv. asman 'stone, sling-stone, heaven'. The original PIE meaning appears to have been 'stone(-made weapon)' > 'heavenly vault of stone' (cf. Grk ákmōn 'anvil, meteoric stone, thunderbolt, heaven', Goth. himins 'heaven', Lith. akmuõ 'stone'). See Perkwunos (Heavenly vault of stone) for further information.
*SáraswatiH / saras-u̯at-iH-	Skt sárasvatī	YAv. haraxᵛatī OPers. Harauvati	From PIE *séles 'marsh'.	The name refers to a river (Sarasvati River in Sanskrit; or Arachosia). Also the name of a river goddess, Saraswati.

=== Entities ===
Proto-Indo-Iranian reconstruction	Meaning	Indo-Aryan	Iranian	Etymology	Notes
*daywás	god, deity	Skt devá	OAv. daēuua	From PIE *deywós 'celestial > god'.	The Iranian word is at the origin of the div, a creature of Persian mythology, later spread to Turkic and Islamic mythologies.
*daywiH	goddess	Skt devī́	YAv. daēuuī	From PIE *deywih_{2} 'goddess'.	
*g^{(h)}and^{h}(a)rwas- ~ g^{(h)}and^{h}(a)rb^{h}as-		Skt gandharvá	YAv. gandərəba	No known IE cognate.	Group of mythical beings.
*Hasuras	god, lord	Skt ásura	Av. ahura	From PIE *h₂ems-u- < *h₂ems- ('to give birth').	The singular in the Avesta refers to Ahura Mazda. According to Asko Parpola and Václav Blažek, the word has been borrowed into Finno-Ugric/Uralic languages as *asera- (Parpola) or *asɤrɜ- (Blazek), both meaning 'lord, prince, leader'.

=== Other ===
Proto-Indo-Iranian reconstruction	Meaning	Indo-Aryan	Iranian	Etymology	Notes
*b^{h}išáj	'healer'	Skt bhišáj-	OAv. biš-	No known IE cognate.	
*dać-	'to offer, worship'	Skt dáś-	OAv. dasəma	From PIE *deḱ-.	
*diuiHa	'heavenly, divine'	Skt divyá	–	From PIE *diwyós 'heavenly, divine'.	
*gau(H)-	'call, invoke'	Skt gav^{(i)}	–	From PIE gewh_{2}-.	cf. also Osset. argawyn < *agraw- ('to perform a church service').
*grH-	'song of praise, invocation'	Skt gír	OAv. gar-	From PIE g^{w}erH-.	
*(H)anću	'Soma plant'	Skt amśú-	YAv. ᶏsu-	Presumably a loanword.	
*HaHpriH	'wishing, blessing, invocation'	Skt āprī́	YAv. āfrī	No known IE cognate.	
*Hiáj	'to worship, sacrifice'	Skt yaj	Av. yaz-	From PIE *hieh_{2}ǵ-.	
*Hiájata	'worthy of worship, sacrifice'	Skt yajatá	Av. yazata-	From PIE *hieh_{2}ǵ-.	
*Hiájna	'worship, sacrifice'	Skt yajna	Av. yasna-	From PIE *hieh_{2}ǵ-.	
*Hiša	'refreshing libation'	Skt ídā	OAv. īžā	No known IE cognate.	
*Hižd-	'to invoke, worship'	Skt īd-	OAv. īšas-	From PIE *h_{2}eisd-.	
*(H)rši	'seer'	Skt ṛ́si	OAv. ərəšiš	No known IE cognate.	
*Hrta	'truth, (world-)order'	Skt ṛtá	OAv. aša, arəta	From PIE *h_{2}rtó.	
*HrtaHuan	'belonging to Truth'	Skt ṛtā́van	OAv. ašauuan	From PIE *h_{2}rtó.	
*j́^{h}au-	'pour, sacrifice, offer'	Skt hav	Av. ā-zuiti	From PIE *ǵ^{h}eu-.	
*j́^{h}au-tar	'priest'	Skt hótar	Av. zaotar	From PIE *ǵ^{h}eu-.	
*j́^{h}au-traH	'sacrificial pouring'	Skt hótrā	YAv. zaoθrā	From PIE *ǵ^{h}eu-.	
*namas	'to worship, honour'	Skt námas	Av. nəmah	From PIE *némos.	
*sauma	'Soma-plant', a deified drink	Skt sóma	YAv. haoma	No known IE cognate.	Probably referring to ephedra.
*uájra	Mythical weapon	Skt vájra	YAv. vazra	From PIE *ueh_{2}ǵ-.	Mythical weapon associated with Indra in India and with Mithra in Iran. Cf. Arm. varz ('stick'), a loanword from Iranian.
*uand(H)	'to praise, honour'	Skt vand^{i}	YAv. vandaēta	No known IE cognate.	
*ućig	'sacrificer'	Skt uśíj	OAv. usij	Likely a borrowing from a Central Asian language.	Skt uśíj is an epithet of sacrificers and of Agni. OAv. usij designates a 'sacrificer which is hostile towards the Zoroastrian religion'.
*uipra	'exctasic, inspired'	Skt vípra	YAv. vifra	No known IE cognate.	See Viprata for further information.
*urata	'rule, order, religious commandment, observance'	Skt vratá	OAv. uruuata	No known IE cognate.	

== See also ==
- Ancient Iranian religion
- Ætsæg Din
- Fire in ancient Iranian culture
- Hinduism
- Historical Vedic religion
- Indian religions
- Indo-Iranians
- Iranian religions
- Persian mythology
- Religion and culture in ancient Iran
- Zoroastrianism
- Proto-Celtic religion
- Proto-Germanic folklore
- Scythian religion

== Sources ==
- Anthony, David W. (2007), The Horse, The Wheel And Language. How Bronze-Age Riders From the Eurasian Steppes Shaped The Modern World, Princeton University Press, ISBN 978-0-691-14818-2
- Anthony, David W.; Vinogradov, Nikolai B. (1995). "Birth of the Chariot". Archaeology. 48 (2): 36–41. ISSN 0003-8113. JSTOR 41771098.
- Bryant, Edwin (2001), The Quest for the Origins of Vedic Culture: The Indo-Aryan Migration Debate, Oxford University Press, ISBN 978-0-19-513777-4
- Burrow, T. (1973), "The Proto-Indoaryans", Journal of the Royal Asiatic Society of Great Britain and Ireland, 105 (2): 123–140, doi:10.1017/S0035869X00130837, JSTOR 25203451, S2CID 162454265
- Diakonoff, Igor M.; Kuz'mina, E. E.; Ivantchik, Askold I. (1995), "Two Recent Studies of Indo-Iranian Origins", Journal of the American Oriental Society, vol. 115, no. 3, American Oriental Society, pp. 473–477, doi:10.2307/606224, JSTOR 606224
- Fournet, Arnaud (2010). "About the Mitanni Aryan gods". Journal of Indo-European Studies. 38 (1–2): 26–40.
- Jones-Bley, K.; Zdanovich, D. G. (eds.), Complex Societies of Central Eurasia from the 3rd to the 1st Millennium BC, 2 vols, JIES Monograph Series Nos. 45, 46, Washington D.C. (2002), ISBN 0-941694-83-6, ISBN 0-941694-86-0
- Kuz'mina, Elena Efimovna (1994), Откуда пришли индоарии? (Whence came the Indo-Aryans), Moscow: Российская академия наук (Russian Academy of Sciences).
- Kuz'mina, Elena Efimovna (2007), Mallory, James Patrick (ed.), The Origin of the Indo-Iranians, Leiden Indo-European Etymological Dictionary Series, Leiden: Brill
- Lubotsky, Alexander (2011), "Indo-Aryan Inherited Lexicon", Indo-European Etymological Dictionary Project, Brill.
- Mallory, J.P. (1989), In Search of the Indo-Europeans: Language, Archaeology, and Myth, London: Thames & Hudson.
- Mallory, J. P.; Adams, Douglas Q. (1997), "Indo-Iranian Languages", Encyclopedia of Indo-European Culture, Fitzroy Dearborn.
- Mallory, J. P.; Mair, Victor H. (2000), The Tarim Mummies: Ancient China and the Mystery of the Earliest People from the West, London: Thames & Hudson
- Mayrhofer, Manfred (1992). Etymologisches Wörterbuch des Altindoarischen. Carl Winter. ISBN 3-533-03826-2.
- Parpola, Asko (1999), "The formation of the Aryan branch of Indo-European", in Blench, Roger; Spriggs, Matthew (eds.), Archaeology and Language, vol. III: Artefacts, languages and texts, London and New York: Routledge.
- Parpola, Asko (2015). The Roots of Hinduism: The Early Aryans and the Indus Civilization. Oxford University Press. ISBN 978-0-19-022692-3.
- Sulimirski, Tadeusz (1970), Daniel, Glyn (ed.), The Sarmatians, Ancient People and Places, Thames & Hudson, ISBN 0-500-02071-X
- UESUGI, Heindio; CATT, Adam Alvah, eds. (2024). Old Avestan Dictionary (Thesis). Asian and African Lexicon. Vol. 67. Research Institute for Languages and Cultures of Asia and Africa; Tokyo University of Foreign Studies. ISBN 9784863375420.
- Walker, Henry John (2021), The Twin Horse Gods: The Dioskouroi in Mythologies of the Ancient World, Bloomsbury
- Witzel, Michael (2000), "The Home of the Aryans" (PDF), in Hintze, A.; Tichy, E. (eds.), Anusantatyai. Fs. für Johanna Narten zum 70. Geburtstag, Dettelbach: J.H. Roell, pp. 283–338
