= Mitra =

Indo-Iranian divinity

Mitra (Proto-Indo-Iranian: *mitrás) is the name of an Indo-Iranian divinity that came out of the Rigvedic Mitrá and Avestan Mithra.

The names, and some characteristics, of these established deities subsequently influenced other figures:

- Maitreya, a vrddhi-derived form of Sanskrit mitra, a bodhisattva in Buddhist tradition.
- Latin Mithras, the principal figure of the first-century Roman mystery cult of Mithraism, whose name derives from the Avestan theonym via Greek and some Anatolian intermediate.
- In Hellenistic-era Asia Minor, Avestan Mithra was conflated with various local and Greek figures leading to several different variants of Apollo-Helios-Mithras-Hermes-Stilbon.
- In Middle Iranian, the Avestan theonym evolved (among other Middle Iranian forms) into Sogdian Miši, Middle Persian and Parthian Mihr, and Bactrian Miuro (/mihru/). Aside from Avestan Mithra, these derivative names were also used for Greco-Bactrian Mithro, Miiro, Mioro, and Miuro.
- Mithra, the "first messenger" of Iranian Manichaeans. (Note: "The Iranian Manichaeans adopted the name of the Zoroastrian god Mithra (Av. Miθra; Mid. Pers. Mihr) and used it to designate one of their own deities. [...] The name appears in Middle Persian as Mihr (myhr, unrelated to Old Persian form *miça-), in Parthian as Mihr (myhr) and in Sogdian as Miši (myšyy; Sundermann, 1979a, p. 10, sub 3/11.2). The spellings mytr, mytrg, however, are not variants of the name Mithra, they rather denote Maitreya.")

== Indian religious texts ==
Both Vedic Mitra and Avestan Mithra derive from an Indo-Iranian common noun *mitra-, generally reconstructed to have meant "covenant, treaty, agreement, promise." This meaning is preserved in Avestan miθra "covenant". In Sanskrit and modern Indo-Aryan languages, mitra means "friend", one of the aspects of bonding and alliance.

The Indo-Iranian reconstruction is attributed to Christian Bartholomae, and was subsequently refined by A. Meillet (1907), who suggested derivation from the Proto-Indo-European root *mey- "to exchange".

A suggested alternative derivation was *meh "to measure" (Gray 1929). Pokorny (IEW 1959) refined Meillet's *mei as "to bind". Combining the root *mei with the "tool suffix" -tra- "that which [causes] ..." (also found in man-tra-, "that which causes to think"), then literally means "that which binds", and thus "covenant, treaty, agreement, promise, oath" etc. Pokorny's interpretation also supports "to fasten, strengthen", which may be found in Latin moenia "city wall, fortification", and in an antonymic form, Old English (ge)maere "border, boundary-post".

Meillet and Pokorny's "contract" did however have its detractors. Lentz (1964, 1970) refused to accept abstract "contract" for so exalted a divinity and preferred the more religious "piety". Because present-day Sanskrit mitra means "friend", and New Persian mihr means "love" or "friendship", Gonda (1972, 1973) insisted on a Vedic meaning of "friend, friendship", not "contract".

Meillet's analysis also "rectified earlier interpretations" that suggested that the Indo-Iranian common noun *mitra- had anything to do with the light or the sun. When H. Lommel suggested that such an association was implied in the Younger Avesta (since the 6th century BCE), that too was conclusively dismissed. Today, it is certain that "(al)though Miθra is closely associated with the sun in the Avesta, he is not the sun" and "Vedic Mitra is not either."

Old Persian Miθra or Miθ^{r}a – both only attested in a handful of 4th-century BCE inscriptions of Artaxerxes II and III – "is generally admitted [to be] a borrowing from the Avesta," the genuine Old Persian form being reconstructed as *Miça. (Kent initially suggested Sanskrit but later changed his mind). Middle Iranian myhr (Parthian, also in living Armenian usage) and mihr (Middle Persian), derive from Avestan Mithra.

Greek/Latin "Mithras," the focal deity of the Greco-Roman cult of Mithraism is the nominative form of vocative Mithra. In contrast to the original Avestan meaning of "contract" or "covenant" (and still evident in post-Sassanid Middle Persian texts), the Greco-Roman Mithraists probably thought the name meant "mediator". In Plutarch's 1st-century discussion of dualistic theologies, Isis and Osiris (46.7) the Greek historiographer provides the following explanation of the name in his summary of the Zoroastrian religion: Mithra is a meson ("in the middle") between "the good Horomazdes and the evil Aremanius [...] and this is why the Pérsai call the Mediator Mithra". Zaehner attributes this false etymology to a role that Mithra (and the sun) played in the now extinct branch of Zoroastrianism known as Zurvanism.

== Indian Mitra ==
Vedic Mitra is a prominent deity of the Rigveda distinguished by a relationship to Varuna, the protector of rta as described in hymn 2, Mandala 1 of Rigveda. Together with Varuna, he counted among the Adityas, a group of solar deities, also in later Vedic texts. Vedic Mitra is the patron divinity of honesty, friendship, contracts and meetings.

The first extant record of Indo-Aryan Mitra, in the form mi-it-ra-, is in the inscribed peace treaty of c. 1400 BC between Hittites and the Hurrian kingdom of the Mitanni in the area southeast of Lake Van in Asia Minor. Mitra appears there together with four other Indic divinities as witnesses and keepers of the pact.

== Iranian Mithra ==
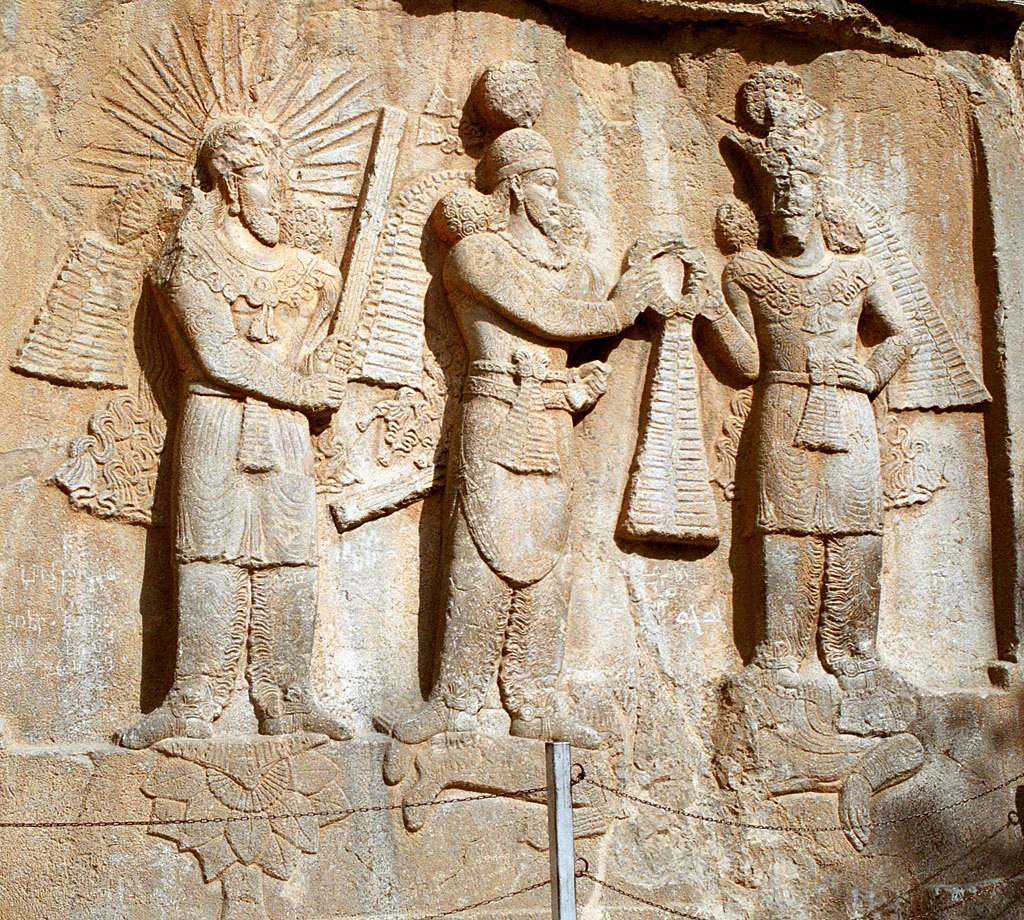
Mithra (left) in a 4th-century investiture sculpture at Taq-e Bostan in western Iran.

In Zoroastrianism, Mithra is a member of the trinity of ahuras, protectors of asha/arta, "truth" or "[that which is] right". Mithra's standard appellation is "of wide pastures" suggesting omnipresence. Mithra is "truth-speaking, ... with a thousand ears, ... with ten thousand eyes, high, with full knowledge, strong, sleepless, and ever awake." (Yasht 10.7). As preserver of covenants, Mithra is also protector and keeper of all aspects of interpersonal relationships, such as friendship and love.

Related to his position as protector of truth, Mithra is a judge (ratu), ensuring that individuals who break promises or are not righteous (artavan) are not admitted to paradise. As also in Indo-Iranian tradition, Mithra is associated with (the divinity of) the sun but originally distinct from it. Mithra is closely associated with the feminine yazata Aredvi Sura Anahita, the hypostasis of knowledge.

== Mithra in Commagene ==
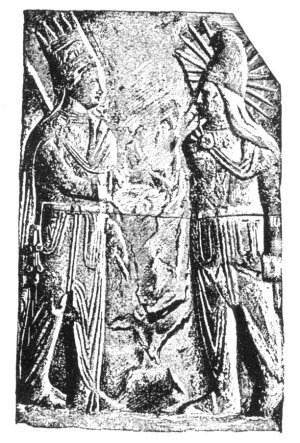
Mithras-Helios, in Phrygian cap with solar rays, with 1st century BC Antiochus I Theos of Commagene, found at Mount Nemrut, in present-day eastern Turkey

There is a deity Mithra mentioned on monuments in Commagene. According to the archaeologist Maarten Vermaseren, 1st century BC evidence from Commagene demonstrates the "reverence paid to Mithras" but does not refer to "the mysteries". (Note: Other early evidence of the first decades B.C. refers only to the reverence paid to Mithras without mentioning the mysteries: Examples which may be quoted are the tomb inscriptions of King Antiochus I of Commagene at Nemrud Dagh, and of his father Mithridates at Arsameia on the Orontes. Both the kings had erected on vast terraces a number of colossal statues seated on thrones to the honour of their ancestral gods. At Nemrud we find in their midst King Antiochus (69–34 BC and in the inscription Mithras is mentioned ...)

In the colossal statuary erected by King Antiochus I (69–34 BC) at Mount Nemrut, Mithras is shown beardless, wearing a Phrygian cap, and was originally seated on a throne alongside other deities and the king himself. On the back of the thrones there is an inscription in Greek, which includes the name Apollo-Mithras-Helios in the genitive case (Ἀπόλλωνος Μίθρου Ἡλίου).

Vermaseren also reports about a Mithras cult in Fayum in the 3rd century BC. (Note: According to Vermaseren, there was a Mithras cult in the Fayum in the third century BC, and according to Pettazzoni the figure of Aion has its iconographic origin in Egypt.) R.D. Barnett has argued that the royal seal of King Saussatar of Mitanni from c. 1450 BC depicts a tauroctonous Mithras. (Note: I ... see these figures, or some of them, in the impression of the remarkable royal seal of King Saussatar of Mitanni (c. 1450 BC great-great-grandfather of Kurtiwaza): The only royal Mitannian seal that we possess. ... Mithra tauroctonos – characteristically kneeling on the bull to despatch it. We can even see also the dog and snake ... below him are twin figures, one marked by a star, each fighting lions ... below a winged disc between lions and ravens, stands a winged, human-headed lion, ...)

== Buddhist Maitreya ==
Maitreya is sometimes represented seated on a throne, and venerated both in Mahāyāna and non-Mahāyāna Buddhism. Some have speculated that inspiration for Maitreya may have come from the ancient Iranian deity Mithra. The primary comparison between the two characters appears to be the similarity of their names. According to Tiele (1917) "No one who has studied the Zoroastrian doctrine of the Saoshyants or the coming saviour-prophets can fail to see their resemblance to the future Maitreya."

== Graeco-Roman Mithras ==
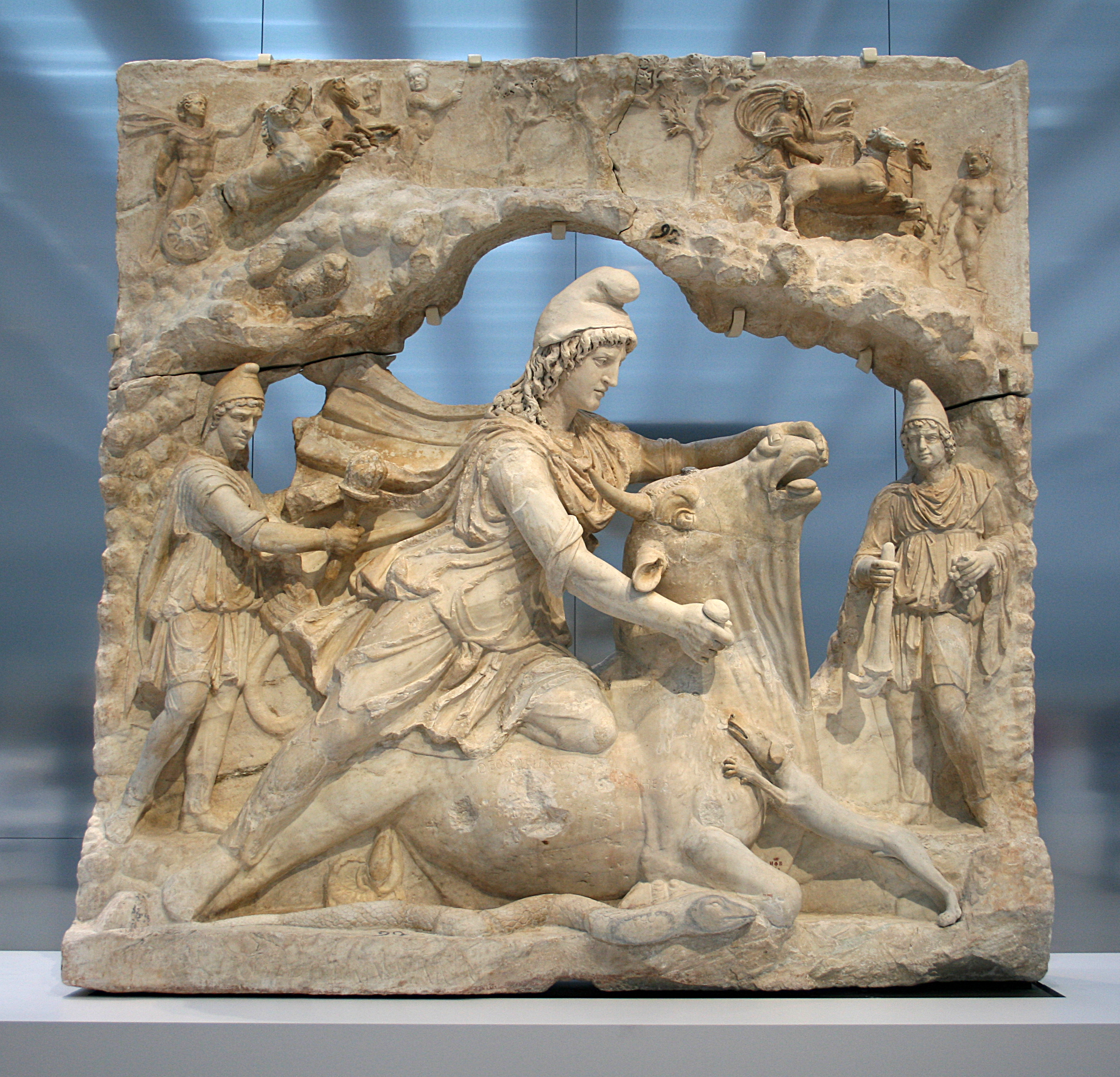
Relief of Roman Mithras, in a tauroctony scene

The name Mithra was adopted by the Greeks and Romans as Mithras, chief figure in the mystery religion of Mithraism. At first identified with the Sun-god Helios by the Greeks, the syncretic Mithra-Helios was transformed into the figure Mithras during the 2nd century BC, probably at Pergamon. This new cult was taken to Rome around the 1st century BC and was dispersed throughout the Roman Empire. Popular among the Roman military, Mithraism was spread as far north as Hadrian's Wall and the Germanic Limes.
