= Burz Yazad =

Zoroastrian god of waters, protector of Iran and guardian of royal glory

Burz Yazad Avestan: 𐬀𐬞𐬄𐬨 𐬥𐬀𐬞𐬁𐬙
- God of waters, defender of Iran, guardian of royal khwarrah, creator of mankind
- Other names: Apam Napat, Burj, Burz, Borz, Burz-i Abannaf, Ahura Bərəzant, Ahura, Vouruna
- Abode: Sea of Vourukasha
- Animals: Swift horse, Chamrosh bird
- Symbol: Water
- Attributes: Waters, seafaring, rainfall, divine glory (khvarenah), kingship, social and political order
- Gender: Male
- Region: Iran, Central Asia
- Associated deities: Mithra, Ohrmazd, Tishtrya, Anahita

Burz Yazad, also known as Apam Napat, Ahura Bərəzant, Borz, Burj, and Burz-i Abannaf, is a yazata of Zoroastrianism and ancient Iranian religion, identified as a water god, protector of Iran, maintainer of social and political order, and creator of mankind. He is responsible for distributing the waters of the cosmic sea Vourukasha throughout the inhabited world, protecting seafarers, and guarding the Farr-e Izadi through which legitimate kingship is maintained among the Iranians. Alongside Mithra, he is credited with preserving order in human society and protecting the lands against disturbances.

Burz Yazad is regarded as an ancient Iranian divinity who once occupied an exalted position in the Iranian pantheon but whose religious prominence subsequently declined. Alongside Ohrmazd and Mithra, he is among the few divinities accorded the title Ahura ("Lord"), and is described in the Avesta as a creator of mankind and a guardian of order. Mary Boyce attributed this decline partly to the elevation of Ohrmazd as supreme creator and the increasing prominence of Anahid, whose worship came to overshadow that of Burz Yazad in connection with the waters.

In Zoroastrian mythology, Burz Yazad is associated with the preservation of royal glory (Farr-e Izadi) after its departure from the mythical king Jamshid, seizing it in the depths of Vourukasha to prevent its possession by the wicked. In the Middle Persian Bundahishn, he also appears as a protector of Iran, emerging from the waters to awaken the mythical bird Chamrosh against forces threatening the Iranian lands. Although his independent prominence diminished, he continued to be venerated in Zoroastrian liturgy under the designation Ahura Bərəzant or Burz Yazad.

== Etymology ==
The name of the Avestan Ahura ("Lord") Apam Napat ("Grandson of the Waters") is sometimes attested in Pahlavi literature simply as Burz (𐭡𐭥𐭫𐭰, bwlc). The name derives from the Avestan epithet bərəzant-, meaning "high" or "lofty", which appears as the first epithet of Apam Napat in Avestan invocations. The opening words bərəzantəm ahurəm ("High Lord") are used in invocations of the deity, who is accordingly known in Sasanian and later Zoroastrian usage as Burz or Burj, the "High One". In the Wizīdagīhā ī Zādspram (3.8), the deity is described as assisting Tishtar alongside Vayu, Bahman and Hōm, and is designated burz ī ābān-nāf, "Burz of the family of the waters". This designation is also translated as "the High One who is the Son of the Waters". Although bərəzant- became the characteristic designation of Apam Napat, it was not exclusive to him, being also applied to Ohrmazd, Mithra, Rashn, Soroush, Ardvisur Anahid, Tishtar and Hom.

The Pahlavi translations preserve both the shorter designation burz ī ābān-nāf and a longer form derived from the Avestan liturgical invocation. In Yasna 2.5, the deity is addressed as bərəzantəm ahurəm xšaθrīm xšaētəm Apam Napatəm auruuataspəm, translated as "the lofty, powerful Lord, the bright Apam Napat, whose steeds are swift". Its Pahlavi rendering is burz ī xwadāy mādagān ī rōšn ī ābān-nāf ī arwand-asp. The rendering of Avestan xšaθriia-, meaning "powerful" or "lordly", as mādagān, "(Lord) of women", resulted from its confusion with the feminine term xšaθrī-, meaning "woman" or "female". This longer formula appears to have become standard in Pahlavi translations, being preferred even where shorter Avestan invocations are attested. Nevertheless, no corresponding Avestan expression such as barazō apąm napā or barazantəm Apam Napatəm is attested.

The expression ābān-nāf itself represents an interpretation rather than a literal translation of Avestan Apam Napat-. A more direct rendering of "grandson of the waters" would have been ābān-nab, whereas ābān-nāf denotes "of the family of the waters" or "navel of the waters". This interpretation is also reflected in the Sanskrit translation attributed to Neriosangh, which renders the deity's designation as burjasvāminam nābhim apāṃ, "Lord Burja; navel of the Waters". Its accompanying explanation identifies Burja as the angel of women, describes his nature as water and presents him as an undefiled source from which the waters of Arvand originate and by which the most beautiful horses are produced. According to Antonio Panaino, the rendering of Avestan napāt-, and particularly nafaδrō and nafaδrat, as nāf rather than nab probably arose during the Sasanian period and indicates that the translators no longer recognized the original meaning of napāt-.

Panaino further observes that the use of Burz as an independent name is noteworthy because bərəzant- was a common epithet rather than an attribute peculiar to Apam Napat. An alternative epithet more closely associated with the deity's nature was upāpa-, "living in the waters", although this designation was also applied to the demon Gandarəβa and occurs in reference to Apam Napat only once.

The relationship between Burz and Apam Napat has been interpreted differently by scholars. Mary Boyce suggested that Apam Napat was originally a descriptive appellation rather than the deity's proper name, with Burz or Burj subsequently becoming the preferred name in invocations. Panaino, however, considers this interpretation unnecessary, observing that Apam Napat is the only designation independently attested in the Avesta. He argues that Burz progressively became the deity's established name during the Sasanian period, while ābān-nāf came to function as a subsidiary epithet. As evidence of this distinction, he notes that Neriosangh retained Burz as the untranslated name burja, while translating ābān-nāf as nābhim apām, treating the latter as an epithet.

== Origins and history ==
Apam Napat ("Son of the Waters") is an ancient Iranian divinity whose original identity and position in the Iranian pantheon have been the subject of scholarly debate. Although principally associated with the waters in surviving Zoroastrian literature, several Avestan passages suggest that he formerly occupied a much more prominent position in Iranian religion. Alongside Ohrmazd and Mithra, he is one of only three divinities accorded the title Ahura ("Lord"). He shares with Mithra, with whom he divides the daylight hours, the Ahuric responsibility of maintaining order in human society. His exalted status is reflected in Zamyād Yašt (Yašt 19.52), where he is invoked as the "High Lord" and described as imperial, majestic, swift-horsed, and a benefactor who responds readily to prayers. The same verse credits him with the creation and shaping of mankind.

Mary Boyce regarded Apam Napat as a surviving representative of an ancient triad of great Iranian Ahuras, whose origins she traced to the common Indo-Iranian religious tradition. In her reconstruction, the three divinities originally constituted a group of principal moral gods, distinguished by the predominance of their ethical functions. Earlier attempts to derive these divinities from foreign religious traditions, particularly that of Babylon, were unsuccessful. Boyce considered their Indo-Iranian origins firmly established and suggested that their worship developed during a period when the ancestors of the Indians and Iranians still formed a single community, governed by kings and possibly a high king. According to this interpretation, the development of these divine figures reflected an increasing concern with rulership and the maintenance of social and cosmic order.

Within this reconstructed hierarchy, Ohrmazd, the "Lord Wisdom", occupied the highest position. He was conceived as a solitary and powerful deity whose sphere of activity was not restricted to any particular natural phenomenon or specialized function. His māyā, or supernatural power, was understood to encompass all beneficent workings. Beneath him stood two great Ahuras of equal standing, Mithra and Apam Napat, who fulfilled his commands. Boyce identified the latter with the reconstructed Iranian deity *Vouruna, corresponding to Varuṇa, and regarded the divine pair as the Iranian counterparts of Mitra and Varuṇa.

Boyce further argued that Apam Napat's surviving attributes point to a divinity whose former importance had considerably diminished. Despite the limited references to him in Zoroastrian literature, he retained the title Ahura, was credited with creating mankind and protecting cosmic and social order, and appeared as the equal partner of Mithra. His connection with water also complemented Mithra's association with fire. According to Boyce, *Vouruna suffered a greater decline following Zoroaster's religious reforms than Mithra. Although this might suggest that Mithra had already become the more prominent of the two before Zoroaster, she argued that the evidence instead indicated an originally exalted position for *Vouruna within the ancient Iranian pantheon.

== Identification with Vouruna ==
The identification of Apam Napat with the reconstructed Iranian deity *Vouruna, corresponding to the Vedic god Varuṇa, has been the subject of scholarly disagreement. The debate concerns both the identity of the original Iranian Ahura and the relationship between Apam Napat, Mithra and Ohrmazd in pre-Zoroastrian religion. F. B. J. Kuiper regarded the Iranian ahura as a designation inherited from prehistoric Indo-Iranian religion, corresponding to the Vedic asura. In his reconstruction, the asuras represented an older class of divinities, including Varuṇa and Mitra, who originally ruled over an undifferentiated primeval cosmos. With the emergence of the dualistic cosmic order, certain asuras, including Varuṇa, Mitra, Agni and Soma, became associated with the younger gods, the devas, while others were excluded from the ordered world.

According to Kuiper, the Old Iranian high god was historically equivalent to Varuṇa, and partly to the divine pair Mitra–Varuṇa, but originally lacked a distinct proper name. He was instead designated Ahura or Ohrmazd, "the Wise Ahura". Zarathustra regarded him as the supreme Ahura, addressing him as the mightiest of the Ahuras and the Wise One (Yasna 33.11), while also distinguishing Mazdā from the other Ahuras (Yasna 30.9, 31.4). Kuiper compared these designations with those of Varuṇa, who is similarly described in the Vedic hymns as a wise Asura, including through the epithets prácetas and medhira. Kuiper identified possible remnants of this earlier mythology in several Avestan expressions, including ahuraδāta, "created by the Ahura", the application of ahura to Mithra and Apam Napat, and ahurānī, "wife of the Ahura", used in connection with the waters. He further interpreted the archaic formula miθra ahura bərəzanta, "Mithra and Ahura, the exalted ones", as corresponding to the Vedic divine pair Mitra–Varuṇa. In this interpretation, the unnamed Ahura accompanying Mithra represented the Iranian counterpart of Varuṇa. Kuiper considered the original Indo-Iranian name of this divinity unrecoverable, since alternative or taboo names may have developed at different periods.

Mary Boyce, by contrast, identified the Iranian counterpart of Varuṇa specifically with Apam Napat, rather than with Ohrmazd. She based this identification partly on the close association between Apam Napat and Mithra in Avestan literature. Both are presented as exalted Ahuras of comparable standing, jointly responsible for maintaining social order and associated respectively with water and fire. Boyce drew attention to the wording of Yašt 13.95, in which Mithra is said to pacify disturbances (rāmayeiti), while Apam Napat restrains them (nyāsāite). She compared this restraining function with the characteristic activity of Varuṇa, particularly his power to bind or fetter wrongdoing. Boyce also identified similarities between the attributes of the Iranian Apam Napat and those of his Vedic namesake. Although the latter receives only one dedicated hymn in the Rigveda, he is celebrated in exalted language and credited with creating all beings through his divine power, corresponding to the Iranian Apam Napat's creation and shaping of mankind in Yašt 19.52. The Vedic deity is described as āśuheman-, "urger on of horses", while the Avestan deity bears the epithet "having swift horses". These expressions have been interpreted as appropriate to a divinity governing the movements of the waters, comparable in this respect to the Greek Poseidon. In Vedic interpretation, however, Apam Napat is frequently identified with Agni, the fire god. Gray argued that this identification finds no equivalent support in the Iranian evidence.

The apparent distinction between Varuṇa and Apam Napat in the Vedic texts presented a difficulty for Boyce's identification. She proposed that Apam Napat, "Son of the Waters", had originally been an appellation of Varuṇa in his capacity as lord of the oath, and that the Iranian deity had preserved this ancient designation. On this basis, she reconstructed Apam Napat as *Vouruna, whose relationship with Mithra paralleled that of the Vedic pair Mitra–Varuṇa. Boyce considered the corresponding positions and functions of these divinities strong evidence for a common Indo-Iranian divine structure. A further part of Boyce's argument concerned the use of the title Ahura. She suggested that the ancient Iranian designation "the Ahura" originally referred to *Vouruna rather than Ohrmazd. She observed that Mazdā was rarely invoked without the title Ahura and, as far as could be established, was never independently addressed simply as "Ahura". Even in the Gāthās, where the two elements remained grammatically separate, Mazdā was accompanied by the title within the same hymn. By the fifth century BCE, the two elements had become fused into the single Old Persian name A(h)uramazda. The name also appears in personal-name compounds with other divine names, including Mesoromasdes, preserved by Plutarch, the Sasanian Mihrohrmazd, and Māhohrmazd. Boyce considered these compounds potentially ancient survivals, noting that grammatical rules governing their formation placed the shorter divine name before the longer one, irrespective of the gods' relative status.

Boyce therefore regarded Apam Napat, regularly invoked as ahura bərəzant-, the "High Lord", as the only Iranian divinity demonstrably addressed by the title Ahura alone. Following an interpretation proposed by Friedrich Spiegel, she identified the unnamed Ahura in the ancient compound miθra ahura bərəzanta with Apam Napat, extending this interpretation through her identification of the latter with *Vouruna. She further proposed that the Iranian name *Ahuradāta, "created by the Ahura", might originally have referred to creation by *Vouruna, in contrast with the attested Middle Iranian Ohrmazddāt, "created by Ahuramazda". However, the interpretation of the proposed attestation of *Ahuradāta has itself been challenged.

Antonio Panaino rejected an important grammatical basis of Boyce's interpretation. Following Johanna Narten, he argued that the adjective bərəzanta in the expression miθra ahura bərəzanta is grammatically dual and therefore qualifies both Mithra and Ahura, rather than identifying the second divinity alone as the "High Lord". Although Panaino acknowledged the hypothetical possibility of a later interpretation resembling that proposed by Spiegel and Boyce, he noted that the Pahlavi translation of Niyāyišn 1.7 renders the expression as mihr xwadāy ī buland, "Mihr, the high lord", rather than explicitly referring to both Mihr and Burz. For Panaino, the absence of such a distinction in the Pahlavi translation weakened the proposed identification of the unnamed Ahura with Apam Napat.

Panaino also considered the distinction between the Middle Persian name Burz and the ordinary adjective borz, both written bwlc. Following MacKenzie, he suggested that the differing readings reflected a semantic distinction between the divine name and the adjective "high", indicating that Burz had become established as the deity's proper name. He also rejected the identification, proposed by Gray and Markwart, of the Bactrian name ΑΡΟΟΑϹΠΟ, derived from auruuataspa-, with Apam Napat, arguing instead for its derivation from Old Iranian *druwāspa-. Other difficulties concern the interpretation of Burz in Middle Persian geographical and liturgical passages. The absence of an otherwise attested lake Arang has raised the possibility of confusion between a lake and a river. West suggested that the Burz mentioned in this context might refer not to Apam Napat but to the Avestan deity Barajya. Bartholomae also recorded Burz Yazad in the Indian Bundahishn (7.3). The Pahlavi translations of Yasna 1.7, 2.7, 3.9, 4.12, 6.6 and 7.9 render Avestan barəjiiā- as burziy, while Gāh 5.6 renders it burz yazd.

== Waters, rainfall and seafaring ==
In Zoroastrian religion, the waters are themselves divinized and venerated as goddesses, collectively known as the Āpas. Their identification with the element is reflected in the Yasna Haptaŋhāiti (Yasna 38.3), where the waters are venerated as the wives of the Ahura and described as suitable for crossing and bathing. A comparable conception appears in Vedic literature, where the waters are described as goddesses that are wholesome to drink. Mary Boyce distinguished Apam Napat from the waters themselves on this basis, arguing that whereas the Āpas were identified with the element, Apam Napat, whom she identified with *Vouruna, was a divinity dwelling within it. In both Avestan and Middle Persian literature, Apam Napat is closely associated with the distribution of water throughout the material world. The Tīr Yašt (Yašt 8.34), a hymn dedicated to the rain-bringing star Tishtar, states that Apam Napat distributes the waters assigned to the dwelling places of the world. Another passage (Yašt 8.4) associates him with the nature or manifestation of Tishtar, declaring that the latter derives his ciθra- from Apam Napat.

The Pahlavi texts similarly present Apam Napat, under the name Burz Yazad, primarily as a divinity of the waters dwelling among the great mythical waters of the world, while retaining his association with the protection of xᵛarənah (Middle Persian khwarrah). According to the Greater Bundahishn (26.91–92), his dwelling is situated alongside Anahid and the undefiled waters. His principal responsibility is the distribution of water from the cosmic ocean Vourukasha to the various regions of the earth. He is also charged with protecting creatures from dangerous surges while crossing the sea and with guarding the divine glory. The same passage describes him as a lord associated with the females, the lineage of the waters and swift horses.

Antonio Panaino likewise connected Burz with the rains and the waters of both heaven and earth, identifying him as one of the principal divine assistants of Tishtar in the production and distribution of rainfall. In this capacity, Burz belongs to the group of atmospheric divine assistants (hamkārān) associated with Tishtar, alongside Wind, Sadwēs and Hōm. Panaino interpreted this association as placing Burz within the first celestial sphere of later Zoroastrian cosmography, identified with the sphere of the clouds. He emphasized, however, that this did not make Burz a sky god, but rather reflected the celestial background of the myths concerning Vourukasha and the production of pure waters.

Panaino further compared Burz's distribution of waters among the seven kishwars, or regions of the earth, with the function assigned to the star Satavaēsa in Yašt 8.9 and 8.32–33. He also examined the relationship between Apam Napat and Tishtar in Yašt 8.4, where the latter's ciθra- is said to derive from Apam Napat. The meaning of ciθra- in this passage is uncertain, admitting interpretations such as "progeny" or "seed", as well as "appearance", "visible form" or "manifestation". Panaino rejected the interpretation that Tishtar was literally the son of Apam Napat, considering the evidence insufficient, and instead favored an association between the visible manifestation of Tishtar, identified with Sirius, and the divinity of the waters.

The same verse presents a further ambiguity in the expression yahmāt haca barazāt haosrauuayham, which may be understood as referring to the height or exalted position of Apam Napat. Panaino suggested that the expression might refer directly to Apam Napat and connect with the following words, apąm nafaδrat haca ciθram. Although he considered the original intention of the passage uncertain, he suggested that such an interpretation may have been accepted during the Sasanian period. He further argued that the epithet bərəzant-, continued in Middle Persian as burz, came to represent not merely an honorific designation but the deity's established name, while ābān-nāf became a secondary attribute. In his interpretation, this development reflected Burz's elevated position and his particular functions within the mythological cycle of Tishtar. The connection between Burz's watery dwelling and his protective functions also appears in the mythological material concerning the royal glory. In Yašt 19, Apam Napat participates in the preservation of the xᵛarənah after its departure from Yima and its retreat into the depths of Vourukasha. Panaino identified a continuation of this mythological role in the Greater Bundahishn (24F.24), where Burz rises from the depths of the waters of Arang and awakens the bird Chamrosh.

== Protection of Iran ==
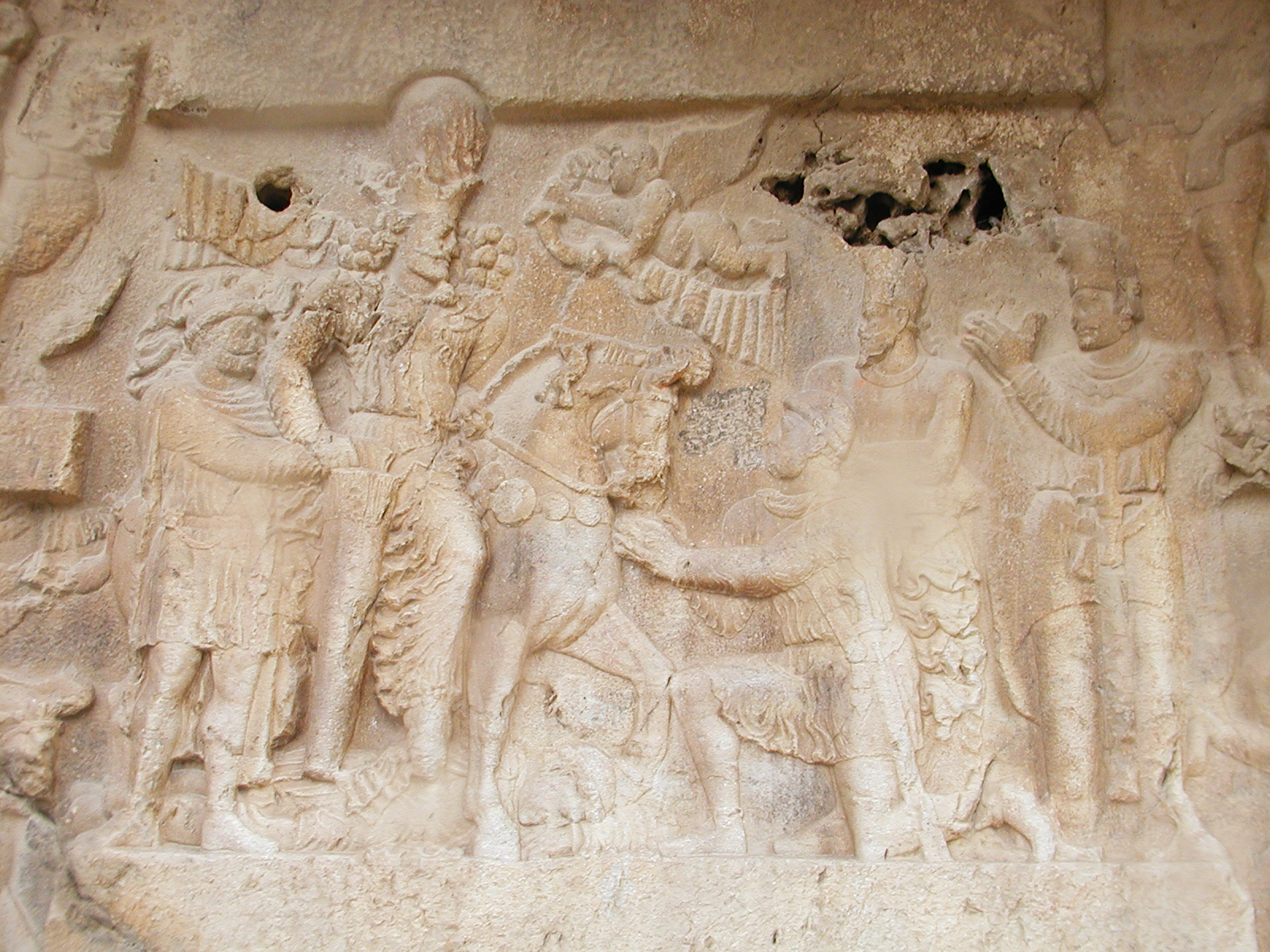
Possibly depiction of Burz Yazad (flying fgure) as Eros, delivering the royal Khwarrah to Shapur I

The protective role of Burz Yazad is also reflected in a myth preserved in the Greater Bundahishn (24F.24), in which he intervenes to defend the Iranian lands against destructive forces. According to the account, every three years, hostile forces from non-Iranian lands assemble on the summit of Mount Alborz with the intention of invading Iran and bringing destruction upon the world. Burz emerges from the depths of the waters of Arang and awakens the mythical bird Chamrosh, which attacks the assembled forces and destroys them as a bird pecks at grains of corn.

The Chamrosh is described elsewhere in the Greater Bundahishn as one of the most powerful birds, surpassed only by the mythical Sēn bird. The text similarly places Mount Haparsen, extending from Sistan to Khuzestan, among the greatest mountains, surpassed only by Alborz. Boyce interpreted the episode as consistent with Apam Napat's broader responsibility for maintaining order in the Iranian realm and protecting it against disruptive forces. Alongside Mithra, Apam Napat is associated with the maintenance of social and political order and the protection of legitimate rule. In the Farvardīn Yašt (Yašt 13.95), the two divinities are credited with furthering the ruling councils of the lands and restoring order to those affected by turmoil. The passage distinguishes their respective functions, describing Mithra as pacifying the lands and Apam Napat as restraining disturbances.

Their complementary roles are also reflected in the protection of xᵛarənah (Middle Persian xwarrah), the divine glory or royal fortune through which legitimate kingship is maintained among the Iranians. According to the Zamyād Yašt (Yašt 19), this glory originally belonged to the mythical king Yima, but abandoned him after he allowed a "lying, untrue word" to enter his thoughts (Yašt 19.34). Following its departure, the glory passed into the protection of Mithra and fire before taking refuge in the cosmic sea Vourukasha. There it was seized by Apam Napat in the depths of the waters (Yašt 19.51). Mary Boyce interpreted this episode as illustrating the complementary functions of the two Ahuras. Both seek to preserve the divine glory and prevent its possession by the wicked, but their respective roles are associated with different elements: Mithra with fire and Apam Napat with water.

== Worship and decline ==
The religious standing of Apam Napat appears to have diminished over the course of Zoroastrian history, although his worship and several of his traditional functions continued to be preserved in Zoroastrian literature and ritual. Mary Boyce proposed that this decline was partly connected with the elevation of Ohrmazd and the incorporation of older Iranian religious traditions into Zoroastrianism.

Boyce identified the Yasna Haptaŋhāiti as a possible example of the transfer of religious functions and worship from the older Ahuras to Ohrmazd. Although the surviving text is explicitly dedicated to Ohrmazd, she suggested that it may have undergone revision and originally contained invocations to Mithra and Apam Napat, as the respective lords of fire and water. In support of this interpretation, she pointed to several passages that she considered survivals of an earlier religious tradition. Ohrmazd is described as one who brings harm to those whom he destines for harm (axtiš ahmāi yəm axtōyōi dāyhe), language which Boyce considered more appropriate to Mithra or *Vouruna (Apam Napat) as stern guardians of cosmic order than to the benevolent character attributed to Ohrmazd in Zoroaster's teachings. The same text also describes him as humāyi, "possessed of good māyā", or supernatural power.

Boyce considered the designation of the Waters as ahurānī, "the Ahura's wives", in Yasna 38.3 particularly significant. She compared this expression with the Vedic designation varuṇānī, referring to the waters as the wives of Varuṇa. In her interpretation, this parallel supported the identification of the original Iranian "Ahura" with *Vouruna Apam Napat, whose attributes as a divinity of the waters were subsequently transferred to Ohrmazd. She regarded the Yasna Haptaŋhāiti as the only surviving passage in which this particular transfer of attributes could be traced. Boyce further suggested that certain passages in Yašt 5, which retain masculine pronouns despite being addressed to the goddess Arədvī Sūrā Anahid, may have been adapted from earlier hymns to other divinities, possibly including a lost hymn to *Vouruna Apam Napat.

Another development proposed to have contributed to the decline of Apam Napat was the increasing prominence of Anahid. Boyce associated this process with the Achaemenid devotion to *Anāhiti and the incorporation of her worship into Zoroastrianism through her identification with Arədvī Sūrā Anahid, whereby the goddess acquired an increasingly prominent association with the waters. In the royal inscriptions of Artaxerxes II, Anahid appears alongside Ohrmazd and Mithra in the invocation auramazda anāhita utā miθra, occupying the position that Boyce assigned to the third Ahura in her reconstruction of the older Iranian divine hierarchy. Although the inscriptions of his successor, Artaxerxes III, show a return to a more traditional invocation, the divine triad of Ohrmazd, Anahid and Mithra subsequently became especially prominent in Zoroastrian worship, particularly in western Iran.

Anahid's growing importance as the "Lady of the Waters" gradually displaced Apam Napat, the "Son of the Waters", in both popular and royal worship. This displacement was not immediate or uncontested. The reappearance of the older invocation under Artaxerxes III was interpreted as evidence of the continued importance of Apam Napat, while the absence of a calendar dedication for either divinity was the possible result of competing religious interests that prevented either from obtaining such recognition.

Despite the decline of his independent prominence, Apam Napat continued to receive ritual veneration. The Zoroastrian priesthood may have played an important role in preserving his worship, noting that under the designation Ahura bərəzant, or Burz Yazad, he continued to be invoked alongside the divinities of the Zoroastrian religious calendar during ceremonies dedicated to them collectively.

== See also ==
- Ateshgah of Baku
- Atropatene
- Baba Gurgur
- Eternal flame
- Neptune
- The Land of Fire
- Yanar Dag
