= Ab-Zohr =

Part of Zoroastrian worship

The Ab-Zohr (/ɑːb zɔːr, æb-/; Avestan: 𐬀𐬞 𐬰𐬀𐬊𐬚𐬭𐬀, romanized: ap-zaoθra; Middle Persian: 𐭠𐭯 𐭦𐭥𐭧𐭫, romanized: ab-zohr) is the culminating rite of the greater Yasna service, the principal Zoroastrian act of worship that accompanies the recitation of the Yasna liturgy.

As described in the liturgy that accompanies the procedure, the rite constitutes a symbolic offering (𐭦𐭥𐭧𐭫, zohr < 𐬰𐬀𐬊𐬚𐬭𐬀, zaoθra) to the waters (aban < apas) in order to purify them.

== Technical terms ==
The technical terms Middle Persian ab-zohr and Avestan apé zaoθra literally mean "offering to water" (ab, water; zohr, offering; cf Apas). The words of the expression have Indo-Iranian roots. The Parsi (Indian Zoroastrian) name for the procedure is jōra-mēḷavī (Gujarati: જોરમેળવી, lit. 'strengthen'), which reflects the symbolic purpose of the "offering to water", which is to give it "strength" by purifying it (see Symbolism and Purpose, below). "Ab-Zohr" is pronounced ab-zor in the Zoroastrian Dari language.

The procedure is also called the parahaoma rite, reflecting the technical name of the liquid, the haoma, being prepared and consecrated during the ritual. In the 9th-12th century texts of Zoroastrian tradition the procedure is also occasionally referred to as the hom-zohr, also reflecting the use of the haoma plant in the rite.

== Procedure ==
=== Preparation ===
The Haoma plant (Avestan, middle and modern Persian: hōm) is the source for the essential ingredient for the parahaoma (middle Persian: parahōm), the consecrated liquid that constitutes the offering (zaothra). In Zoroastrian tradition, two independent preparations of parahaoma are made for the offering.

Both preparations must be made between sunrise and noon, in the Hawan gah (Avestan: havani ratu), the "time of pressing". The time of day of the Yasna service is itself dictated by this restriction. The first parahaoma is prepared during the preliminary rites (prior to the Yasna service) in which the site of worship is consecrated. The second parahaoma preparation occurs during the middle third of the Yasna service.

The recipes for the two parahaoma preparations, though not identical, are largely the same. In both cases, the ingredients include three small haoma twigs; consecrated water; twigs and leaves from a pomegranate tree. The second parahaoma also includes milk (in Iran from a cow, in India from a goat). The consecration of the water and haoma (accompanied by ritual laving) also occur during the preliminary rites.

==== First pressing ====
In the first parahaoma, which is prepared immediately prior to the Yasna service (during the preliminary ritual that also sanctifies the site of worship), the leaves or small twigs from the pomegranate tree are cut into pieces, and together with the consecrated haoma twigs and a little consecrated water are repeatedly pounded and strained. The liquid is retained in a bowl, while the twig and leaf residue is placed next to the fire to dry.

==== Second pressing ====
The second parahaoma preparation occurs during the middle third of the Yasna service. It is prepared by the celebrant priest of the Yasna and is essentially the same as the first, but includes milk, and is accompanied by even more pounding and straining. This second parahaoma preparation begins with the recitation of Yasna 22, and continues until the beginning of Yasna 28 (Ahunavaiti Gatha). During the recitation of Yasna 25, the priest dedicates the mixture to "the waters" (see Aban), which mirrors the purpose of the parahaoma preparation (see below).

The mortar remains untouched during the recitation of Yasna 28–30. Finally, during the recitation of Yasna 31–34, the priest pounds the mixture a last time and then strains the liquid into the bowl that also contains the first parahaoma. The twig and leaf residue from the second parahaoma is also placed next to the fire to dry.

=== Offering ===
Yasna 62 marks the beginning of the final stage of the Yasna service. At the beginning of the recitation of that chapter, the priest who made the first parahaoma moves the (now dry) twig and leaf residue from next to the fire into the fire itself. Although this is done at a specific point during the recitation of the liturgy, the burning of the residue is not an offering to the fire, but the ritually proper way to dispose of combustible consecrated material.

Yasna 62.11 also marks the beginning of the actual ab-zohr. During the following recital of Yasna 62, 64, 65 and 68, the celebrant repeatedly pours the combined parahaomas between two bowls and the mortar, such that, by the end of Yasna 68, all three vessels contain the same amount of liquid.

The service then concludes with the recitation of Yasna 72, immediately after which the priest carries the mortar with parahaoma to a well or stream. There, in three pourings, libations are made to the waters (Aban), accompanied by invocations to Aredvi Sura Anahita. The remaining parahaoma in the two bowls is given to persons attending the ceremony. Since the liquid, in its ritually pure state, is considered beneficial, participants may choose to drink a little of it, or provide some to infants or the dying. The remainder is poured away on the roots of fruit-bearing trees.

== Symbolism and purpose ==
The offering (the parahaoma mixture) represents animal life (the milk) and plant life (the sap of the pomegranate leaves and twigs), combined with the strengthening and healing properties attributed to haoma.

Through the addition of consecrated water, the preparation of the parahaoma symbolically returns the life given by Aban ('the waters'). The principal purpose of the Ab-Zohr is to "purify" those waters, as is evident in Yasna 68.1, where the zaothra ('offering') makes good for the damage done to water by humanity: "These offerings, possessing haoma, possessing milk, possessing pomegranate, shall compensate thee".

This is underscored in Vendidad 14.4, where the appropriate atonement for the sin of killing a "water dog" (an otter) is an "offering to the waters." Vendidad 18.72 also recommends its use as a general penance. According to a passage of the Avesta that survives only as a translation in Denkard 8.25.24, the ingredients and materials for an offering to the waters were carried by the priests accompanying an army so that soldiers could perform the ritual before battle.

The decontamination symbolism in the Ab-Zohr is a reflection of Zoroastrian cosmogony, wherein the primeval waters (the lower half of the sky, upon which the universe rests, and from which two rivers encircle the earth) fear pollution by humankind. According to Bundahishn 91.1, Ahura Mazda promised the waters to "create one (i.e. Zoroaster) who will pour haoma into you to cleanse you again."

According to tradition, Zoroaster frequently made the offering to water (Zatspram 19.2-3), and received his revelation on a riverbank while preparing parahaoma (Zatspram 21.1).
