= Chamrosh =

Immortal guardian bird of Iranian mythology

Creature information
- Grouping: Mythical creature
- Folklore: Persian mythology

Origin
- Country: Ancient Iran

Chamrosh (Persian: چمروش) is a bird in Persian mythology said to live on the summit of Mount Alborz, Iran.

Chamrosh is described as having the body of a dog/wolf with the head and wings of an eagle. It was said to inhabit the ground beneath the soma tree that was the roost of the Simurgh. When the Simurgh descended or alighted from its roost, all the ripened seeds fell to the earth. These seeds were gathered by the Chamrosh, which then distributed them to other parts of the earth. There is a description of the Chamrosh in the Persian Rivayats: "The Creator Ohrmazd has produced on the shores of the sea Vourukasha a tree and two birds who are immortal and without death. Every year a thousand new branches spring up from that tree and all kinds of seeds hang on those branches and all those seeds become ripe. A bird called Amrosh comes and sits on one of the branches and shakes it and scatters down to the ground all the seeds. Another bird called Chamrosh comes and strikes all the seeds with its wings and sides and throws them into the sea. All those seeds go inside a cloud full of rain and that cloud rains on the ground and all the seeds appear on the earth."

Chamrosh is the archetype of all birds, said to rule and protect all avifauna on Earth. According to the Avesta, Persia is pillaged every three years by outsiders, and when this happens, the angel Burj sends Chamrosh out to fly onto the highest mountaintop then snatch the pillagers in its talons as a bird does corn.

Jewish mythology sometimes equates the Chamrosh with the giant bird Ziz.

== See also ==
- Huma bird
- Shahbaz (bird)
- Simurgh
