= Ahura =

Class of Zoroastrian divinities

Ahura (Avestan: 𐬀𐬵𐬎𐬭𐬀) is an Avestan language designation of a type of deity inherited by Zoroastrianism from the prehistoric Indo-Iranian religion, and denotes a particular class of Zoroastrian divinities. The term is assumed to be linguistically related to the Asuras of Indian Vedic era.

== Etymology ==
Avestan ahura "lord" derives from Proto-Indo-Iranian language *Hásuras, also attested in an Indian context as Rigvedic asura. As suggested by the similarity to the Old Norse æsir, Indo-Iranian *Hásuras may have an even earlier Proto-Indo-European language root.

The Rigveda says that Asura such as the “Father Asura”, Varuṇa, and Mitra, are “older gods” who originally ruled over the primeval undifferentiated Chaos.

It is commonly supposed that Indo-Iranian *Hásuras was the proper name of a specific divinity with whom other divinities were later identified.

== In scripture ==
=== Gathas ===
In the Gathas, the oldest hymns of Zoroastrianism and thought to have been composed by Zoroaster, followers are exhorted to pay reverence to only the ahuras and to rebuff the daevas and others who act "at Lie's command". That should not, however, be construed to reflect a view of a primordial opposition. Although the daevas would, in later Zoroastrian tradition, appear as malign creatures, in the Gathas the daevas are (collectively) gods that are to be rejected.

The Gathas do not specify which of the divinities other than Ahura Mazda are considered to be ahuras but does mention other ahuras in the collective sense.

=== Younger Avesta ===
In the Fravaraneh, the traditional name for the Zoroastrian credo summarized in Yasna 12.1, the adherent declares: "I profess myself a Mazda worshiper, a follower of the teachings of Zoroaster, rejecting the daevas ... " This effectively defines ahura by defining what ahura is not.

In the Younger Avesta, three divinities of the Zoroastrian pantheon are repeatedly identified as ahuric. These three are Ahura Mazda, Mithra, and Apam Napat, the "Ahuric triad". Other divinities with whom the term "Ahuric" is associated include the six Amesha Spentas, and (notable among the yazatas) Anahita of the Waters and Ashi of Reward and Recompense.

== See also ==
- Three Pure Ones
- Trikaya
- Tridevi
- Trimurti
- Trinity

== Bibliography ==
- Boyce, Mary (1975). History of Zoroastrianism. Vol. I. Leiden, NL: Brill.
- Boyce, Mary (1983). "Ahura Mazda". Encyclopaedia Iranica. Vol. 1. New York, NY: Routledge & Kegan Paul. pp. 684–687.
- Gershevitch, Ilya (Jan 1964). "Zoroaster's own contribution". Journal of Near Eastern Studies. 23 (1): 12–38. doi:10.1086/371754. S2CID 161954467.
- Kuiper, Bernardus Franciscus Jacobus (1983). "Ahura". Encyclopaedia Iranica. Vol. 1. New York, NY: Routledge & Kegan Paul. pp. 682–683.
- Thieme, Paul (Oct–Dec 1960). "The 'Aryan' gods of the Mitanni treaties". Journal of the American Oriental Society. 80 (4): 301–317. doi:10.2307/595878. JSTOR 595878.
