= Pagan Christianity =

Pagan Christianity may refer to:

- Gentile (non-Jewish) Christianity; see Pauline Christianity
- Syncretism of folk religion and Christianity; see Folk Christianity, Folk Catholicism, and Folk Orthodoxy
- Early Christianity influenced by pagan (Greco-Roman, Hellenistic) religion and philosophy
- Pagan Christianity, a 2008 book by George Barna and Frank Viola
- Christo-Paganism

== See also ==
- Christianity and paganism
- Christian demonology
- Christian mythology
- Christian syncretism
- Christian views on magic
- Circumcision controversy in early Christianity
- Esoteric Christianity
- Gentile
- Neoplatonism and Christianity
