= Louis-Henri d'Aquin =

French physician

- Born: 1602; Avignon, Papal States
- Died: December 1673 (aged 70–71); Paris (France)
- Education: Faculté de médecine de Montpellier (fr)
- Occupations: Hebraist, gemstones broker, physician of Marie de' Medici and of Anne of Austria, then ordinary physician of Louis XIV
- Father: Philippe d'Aquin
- Relatives: Father of Antoine d'Aquin

Louis-Henri d'Aquin (French pronunciation: [lwi ɑ̃ʁi dakɛ̃]; Ludovicus Henricus Aquinas) was born in 1602 in Avignon and died in December 1673 in Paris. He was the physician of Queen mothers of Louis XIII, Marie de' Medici, and of Louis XIV, Anne of Austria, then ordinary physician of Louis XIV from 1644. He was hebraist and gemstones broker.

== Biography ==
His father was Philippe d'Aquin, French physician, hebraist, philologist and orientalist, born Jewish, but who converted to Catholic Christianity. In 1610 he went to Paris, and was appointed by Louis XIII professor of the Hebrew and Aramaic language at the Royal College. Philippe also worked as a doctor with Marie de' Medici and Concino Concini.

Louis-Henri studied medicine in Montpellier and, in 1624, he married Claire Lopez (or Loppez), daughter of Alfonso Henri Lopez, secretary to the pretender to the throne of Portugal, Don Antonio, then financial agent and adviser to Cardinal Richelieu, and of Beatrix Franco.

He was appointed on 7 January 1631 as the Queen Mother Marie de' Medici's physician, then in November 1640 first physician and obtained a patent of arms from d'Hozier on 15 August 1645.

In 1650, he was among the four spagyric physicians or alchemists: Pierre Yvelin, Tobie Bloire, Louis-Henri d'Aquin and Antoine Vallot (fr). The latter was the King's first physician from 1652 to 1671.

On 12 March 1653, Louis-Henri was appointed as the King's ordinary physician and was finally ennobled by letters patent given to Saint-Germain in November 1669.

“It is also said that he was involved in forensic astrology and that, having been called to give his care to the papal nuncio in Paris, he predicted not only his recovery but also his future elevation to the chair of Saint Peter." This nuncio was later Pope Alexander VII. "The pope always held the doctor in high esteem, honouring him several times with his letters and giving him a pendulum" which his grandson had kept.

He had as children :

1. Charles d'Aquin (born 20 February 1627 in Paris; † young)
2. Antoine d'Aquin (° 1629 in Paris; † 17 May 1696 in Vichy) first physician of Louis XIV after Vallot whose niece he had married.
  1. Louis Thomas d'Aquin (born 1667 in Paris; died 7 May 1710 in Paris), priest, dean of the parish of Église Saint-Thomas-du-Louvre (fr) in Paris, bishop of Sées.
3. Françoise Marie d’Aquin (baptised on 13 January 1631 in Saint Germain l'Auxerrois in Paris) married on 30 November 1652 Nicolas Carré, King's Counsellor, Lieutenant General in the Viscounty of Rouen, then Secretary to the King, son of Nicolas Carré and Judith Carrel, of Rouen, on 30 November 1652. Still alive in 1707, she obtained a revision of the pension of her husband, who died in 1690. The Carré de Lusançay family descend from their son Nicolas-Philippe, lord of the Hautière (in Nantes) and the Pou (in Guidel) commissioner of the Navy in Nantes († 1719).
4. Pierre d'Aquin (born 1635 in St. Germain, Paris; missing), ordinary physician of Louis XIV in 1695, married on 17 June 1670 in Saint-Germain l'Auxerrois; he married "Marie~Gabrielle de Ruyan, aged about fifteen, daughter of Sir Charles de Ruyan, squire, lord Du Laurier, adviser to the King and treasurer of the Extraordinary War".
5. Luc d'Aquin (born 1641 in Paris; died 2 mars 1718 in Paris), bishop of Saint Paul Trois Châteaux (1674), Fréjus (1680) which he left to his nephew Louis by resignation in January 1697.
6. Louis Thomas d'Aquin (born 1643), was appointed canon of Saint-Thomas-du-Louvre in 1663, becoming its dean in 1691. In 1688 he received the Abbey of Saint-Laurent-les-Cosne (fr). He resigned from his deanship on 5 January 1724, and died on 9 March 1725, aged eighty-two.
7. Marie Marguerite d'Aquin, married on 10 August 1660 in Saint-Germain, "noble man Claude Dufresne, adviser and doctor to the King, son of the late Didier Du Fresne, bourgeois of Paris, and the late Marguerite Guillemain". She was widowed in 1693.

== Works ==
- Scholia Rabi Salomonis Jarchi in librum Esther. Item excerpta quaedam ex Talmudo et Ialcut in eundem librum, interprete Ludovico Henrico Aquin.
- Item excepta quaedam ex Talmudo et Ialcut in eundem librum. Interprete Ludovico Henrico Aquino.
- Sentetiae et prouerbia Rabbinorum. Ludouico Henrico Daquin interprete.
