= François Vautier =

French doctor and botanist

François Vautier (sometimes written Vauthier or Vaultier), (born in 1589 in Arles; died on 4 July 1652 in Paris) was a French medical doctor and botanist.

== Biography ==
Vautier grew up in Arles. He studied medicine at the University of Montpellier. In 1612, he obtained a doctorate in medicine.

Vautier was Marie de' Medici's personal physician and close friend. After the Day of the Dupes (November 10, 1630) when the queen mother, Marie de' Medici, and Michel de Marillac failed to remove Cardinal Richelieu from power. Cardinal Richelieu had Vautier imprisoned first to Senlis then later to the Bastille. Vautier was released after the cardinal's death in 1642.

=== First physician to the king ===
Once released from prison, Vautier returned to court. In 1643, Louis XIV ascended to the throne. The king's First Physician was Jacques Cousinot (1643 - 1646). After the death of Cousinot in 1646, Louis XIV appointed Vautier as First Physician First Physician to King Louis XIV and Cardinal Mazarin. This gave Vautier not only the privilege of belonging to the Sun King's inner circle, but also the management of the king's botanical garden (Jardin du Roi) and the organization of the medical profession in Paris and beyond. Vautier was also given the title of count.

=== Medical Practice ===
Vautier learned and practiced medicine founded in the remedies of Paracelsus. As was common in at the University of Montpellier, doctors learned to make emetic concoctions to induce vomiting. These were based on antimony, laudanum, or the little-known cinchona bark, a quinine-containing bark from Peru later found to prevent and treat malaria.

A year after his appointment, Vautier performed bloodlettings on the King for kidney stones, and on the queen for high fevers (1647). Vautier also occupied himself with expanding the herb garden at Versailles.

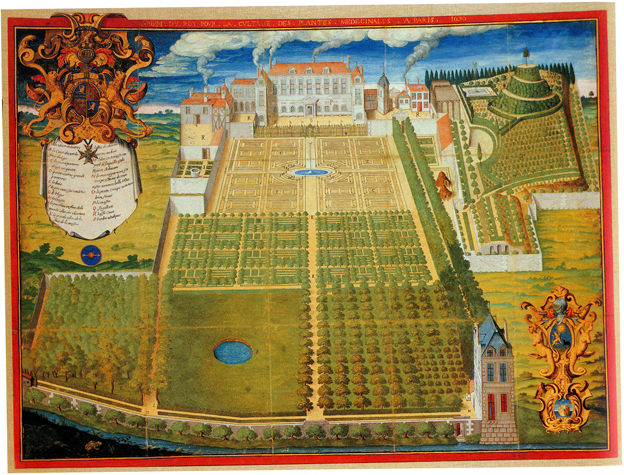
The King's Garden in 1636

Doctors in Paris were appalled by the use of these concoctions "from Montpellier." Gui Patin of Paris called Vautier the worst doctor in all of France. Therefore, on his medical visits to the royal bedrooms, Vautier increasingly brought along colleagues to seek their advice. He therefore invited Guénault and Antoine Vallot (1594-1671) to join him. The latter was also from Arles. Vallot worked his way up at the royal court and wrote the medical bulletins on the King, instead of Vautier.

In 1649, the provocation against Vautier became too great. The Sun King and his brother Philip thanked Vautier for services rendered. As the 60-year-old Vautier was unmarried, Louis XIV named him abbot of the Abbey of Saint-Taurin in Évreux. Vautier became titular abbot of the Benedictines and received prebends, and thus income from the abbey. He remained in office as First Physician until his death on July 4, 1652. Antoine Vallot was named the new First Physician to the King.
