= Antoine d'Aquin =

French physician

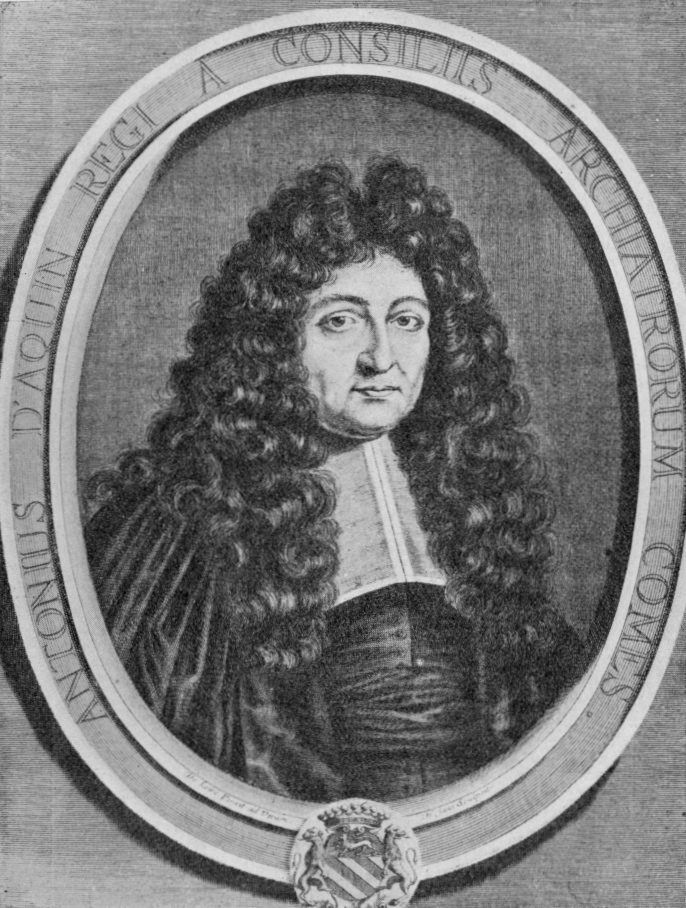
- Engraving portrait, 17th century
- Born: 1629; Paris (France)
- Died: 17 May 1696 (aged 66–67); Vichy (France)
- Education: Faculté de médecine de Montpellier (fr)
- Occupation: Louis XIV first doctor
- Years active: 1672–1693
- Title: Lord and Count de Jouy-en-Josas, Superintant of the mineral and medicinal baths, waters and fountains of France
- Predecessor: Antoine Vallot (fr)
- Successor: Guy-Crescent Fagon
- Spouse: Marguerite Geneviève Gayant (niece of Antoine Vallot)
- Parents: Louis-Henri d'Aquin (father); Claire Louis Lopez (mother)
- Relatives: Grandson of Philippe d'Aquin
- Family: Brother of Pierre, Luc and Louis-Thomas d'Aquin

Antoine d'Aquin (French pronunciation: [ɑ̃twan dakɛ̃]; Antonius Aquinas) born in 1629 in Paris and died on 17 May 1696 in Vichy was a French physician. In April 1672, he became the king's first doctor in the service of Louis XIV. He was Lord and Count de Jouy-en-Josas.

== The beginnings ==
His grandfather was Philippe d'Aquin born Mordekhaï Crescas, his father Louis-Henri d'Aquin, physician to Queen Marie de' Medici, and his mother Claire Louis Lopez.

Antoine studied medicine in Montpellier, became a doctor there (1648) and in 1656 took over his father's office. In the same year (24 October), he married Marguerite Geneviève Gayant, the niece of Antoine Vallot (fr), the king's first doctor in the service of Louis XIV and granddaughter of a royal provost of Clermont-en-Beauvaisis. She died on rue de Verneuil (fr), and her funeral took place in Saint-Sulpice on 11 June 1698. They had ten children, including Louis Thomas d'Aquin (born 1667 in Paris; died 7 May 1710 in Paris), priest, dean of the parish of Église Saint-Thomas-du-Louvre (fr) in Paris, bishop of Sées.

He was first doctor in the service of Queen of France Maria Theresa of Spain, following the death of her physician François Guénault in 1667.

== The King's first doctor ==
On 18 April 1672, he succeeded Antoine Vallot as king's first doctor, after eight months of intrigue and the support of the favourite, Mme de Montespan, maîtresse-en-titre of king Louis XIV.

During his 21 years in office, Daquin had a lot to do with the king: he had to treat a dislocation of the elbow following a fall from a horse, gouty arthritis, a boil in the armpit and necrosis of the palatine arch. He also had to extract the teeth from Louis XIV's upper jaw and treat a perineal abscess which resulted in an anal fistula.

On the subject of this fistula, he took part in a war between doctors and surgeons on how to treat it. Throughout the first part of 1686, the doctors, led by Antoine Daquin, treated with plasters and poultices. Many apothecaries flocked to Versailles hoping to be able to reach the king to treat him and enter his entourage. Among the treatments, the injection of water from Barèges is recommended and doctors are considering sending the king to the Pyrenean spa town. A Parisian surgeon was sent there and testified to the success of these waters for fistula. But Daquin was opposed to the journey which he considers too long and dangerous because of the heat of this season. Finally the surgeon Félix de Tassy (fr) succeeded in convincing the king to have an operation against Daquin's advice. However the operation was a success and will make the surgeon's fame and fortune.

== Disgrace ==
But Daquin took advantage of the time when he had the king's favour to help his family acquire offices and benefits. He constantly asked for boarding houses, abbeys and bishoprics for his own; his office brought him 45,000 pounds a year, which enabled him to acquire the county of Jouy-en-Josas as well as the superintendence of the mineral and medicinal baths, waters and fountains of France. His brothers, Pierre, was the king's ordinary doctor, Luc was bishop of Fréjus and Louis-Thomas was parish priest dean of Saint-Thomas du Louvre in Paris.

Saint-Simon said of him: "D'Aquin, [...] creature of Mme de Montespan, had lost nothing of his credit by the final estrangement from his mistress; but he had never been able to take with Mme de Maintenon, to whom anything that smelt of the other side was always more than suspect. D'Aquin was a great courtier, but rich, stingy, greedy, and wanted to establish his family in any case. His father, an ordinary doctor, was less than nothing [...]. Little by little, the king let himself be bothered by his requests and inconveniences [...]. D’Aquin had a son abbot, of very good morals, of great spirit and knowledge, for whom he dared to ask for [the archbishopric of] Tours, [...] and to press the king with the last vehemence. This was the reef where he broke. Madame de Maintenon took advantage of the disgust in which she saw the king of a man who kept asking [...]. She resolved to chase him away, and at the same time to take Fagon in his place" (Note: « D’Aquin, […] créature de Mme de Montespan, n’avait rien perdu de son crédit par l’éloignement final de sa maîtresse; mais il n’avait jamais pu prendre avec Mme de Maintenon, à qui tout ce qui sentait cet autre côté fut toujours plus que suspect. D’Aquin était grand courtisan, mais riche, avare, avide, et qui voulait établir sa famille en toutes façons. Son père, médecin ordinaire était moins que rien […]. Le roi, peu à peu, se laissait de ses demandes et de ses importunités […]. D’Aquin avait un fils abbé, de très bonnes mœurs, de beaucoup d’esprit et de savoir, pour lequel il osa demander [l’archevêché de] Tours, de plein saut, et en presser le roi avec la dernière véhémence. Ce fut l’écueil où il se brisa. Mme de Maintenon profita du dégoût où elle vit le roi d’un homme qui demandait sans cesse […]. Elle le résolut à le chasser, et en même temps à prendre Fagon à sa place ».)

On 1 November 1693, D'Aquin was asked to retire to Paris, with a ban on seeing the king and writing to him, but with a pension of 6,000 pounds. "He sought to prolong his days in Vichy, and when he arrived there he died [17 May 1696], and with him his family, who had fallen back into nothingness."
