= The Influence of the Mystery Religions on Christianity =

Essay written by Martin Luther King, Jr

"The Influence of the Mystery Religions on Christianity" is an essay written from November 29, 1949, to February 15, 1950, by Martin Luther King Jr. It was written for a course on "The Development of Christian Ideas" at the Crozer Theological Seminary taught by George Washington Davis, who gave it an A grade. It duplicates some material from "A Study of Mithraism" (1949), a previous essay King wrote for a course on Greek religion taught by Morton Scott Enslin.

In the essay, King endeavors to show how five major mystery religions influenced Christianity. These religions include the cult of Cybele and Attis, the cult of Adonis, the worship of Osiris and Isis, the Eleusinian Mysteries, and Mithraism.

== Background ==
After graduating from Morehouse College, King attended Crozer Theological Seminary from 1948 to 1951. He began his studies at Crozer at the age of 19, taking a total of 31 courses over the next several years, while also auditing one additional course on pastoral counseling and taking two additional courses at the University of Pennsylvania during that same period. From 1949 to 1950, he took the course "The Development of Christian Ideas" at Crozer, one of nine courses during that year. King's essay, "The Influence of the Mystery Religions on Christianity", was written as part of that course, taught by George Washington Davis. Historian Clayborne Carson summarizes King's essay as an examination of "how Christianity developed as a distinct religion with a set of central tenets and how it was influenced by those pagan religions it assimilated".

== See also ==
- Christianity and paganism

== Bibliography ==
- Carson, Clayborne (Summer 1997). "Martin Luther King Jr.: The Crozer Seminary Years". The Journal of Blacks in Higher Education. 16: 123–128. Retrieved May 31, 2023.
- Carson, C., Luker, R. E., Russell, P. A., Harlan, L. R. (1992). The Papers of Martin Luther King, Jr., Volume I: Called to Serve, January 1929-June 1951. University of California Press. ISBN 0-520-07950-7.
- Miller, Keith D. (1992). Voice of Deliverance: The Language of Martin Luther King, Jr. and Its Sources. The Free Press. ISBN 0-02-921521-8.
- Pappas, Theodore (1998)[1994]. Plagiarism and the Culture War: The Writings of Martin Luther King, Jr., and Other Prominent Americans. Hallberg. ISBN 0-87319-045-9.
