= Antoine Vallot =

French physician

Antoine Vallot (born in Arles in 1594 or 1595; died on 9 August 1671 at the Royal Garden in Paris) was a French medical doctor. He was First Physician to King Louis XIV. Antoine Vallot had succeeded François Vautier, or Vaultier, as the king's first physician. Antoine d'Aquin succeeded him in 1672.

== Biography ==
=== Doctor in Paris ===
Vallot was a doctor of the Faculty of Medicine of Montpellier. Very active and bold in the practice of medicine, he moved to settle in Paris and quickly became a sought-after doctor for the great figures of the time. Vallot became the physician of Queen Anne of Austria. In 1647 King Louis XIV was treated of smallpox which marked the beginning of his career in the Royal Garden. He was then considered the most skillful court physician. When Vautier (or Vaultier) died on July 4, 1652, he was appointed to replace him in the office of first physician to the king.

=== First physician to the king ===
Vallot tells in the King's Health Journal his appointment as first physician to the king: "On Sunday, the eighth of July, one thousand six hundred and fifty-two, the king being at Saint-Denis with his army, did me the favor, after the death of M. Vaultier, to receive me in charge of first physician, having sent for me two days before from Paris, to serve his Majesty in this dignity. My letters were dispatched on the eighth of the same month, and the next day I took an oath of fidelity between the hands of His said Majesty, with a protest to employ all the lights that God has given me, all the experiences that I have acquired by long work and continual application to medicine for the space of twenty-eight years, and my own life for the preservation of such a precious life. Having received this honor by the grace of God".

Guy Patin accused Antoine Vallot of obtaining this appointment by paying 3,000 livres to Cardinal Mazarin. In 1658, he had the opportunity to treat the king's illness in Calais, where his qualities as a medical practitioner shone and where he cured the king by prescribing emetic wine, an antimony preparation. Vallot, like Vaultier and the doctors of the faculty of Montpellier, was in favor of chemical medicine, while Guy Patin and the doctors of the Faculty of Medicine of Paris were in favor of galenic medicine.

He was blamed for the death of Henrietta Maria of France in 1669, wife of King Charles I and daughter of Henry IV after prescribing her too many opiates of which she overdosed on.

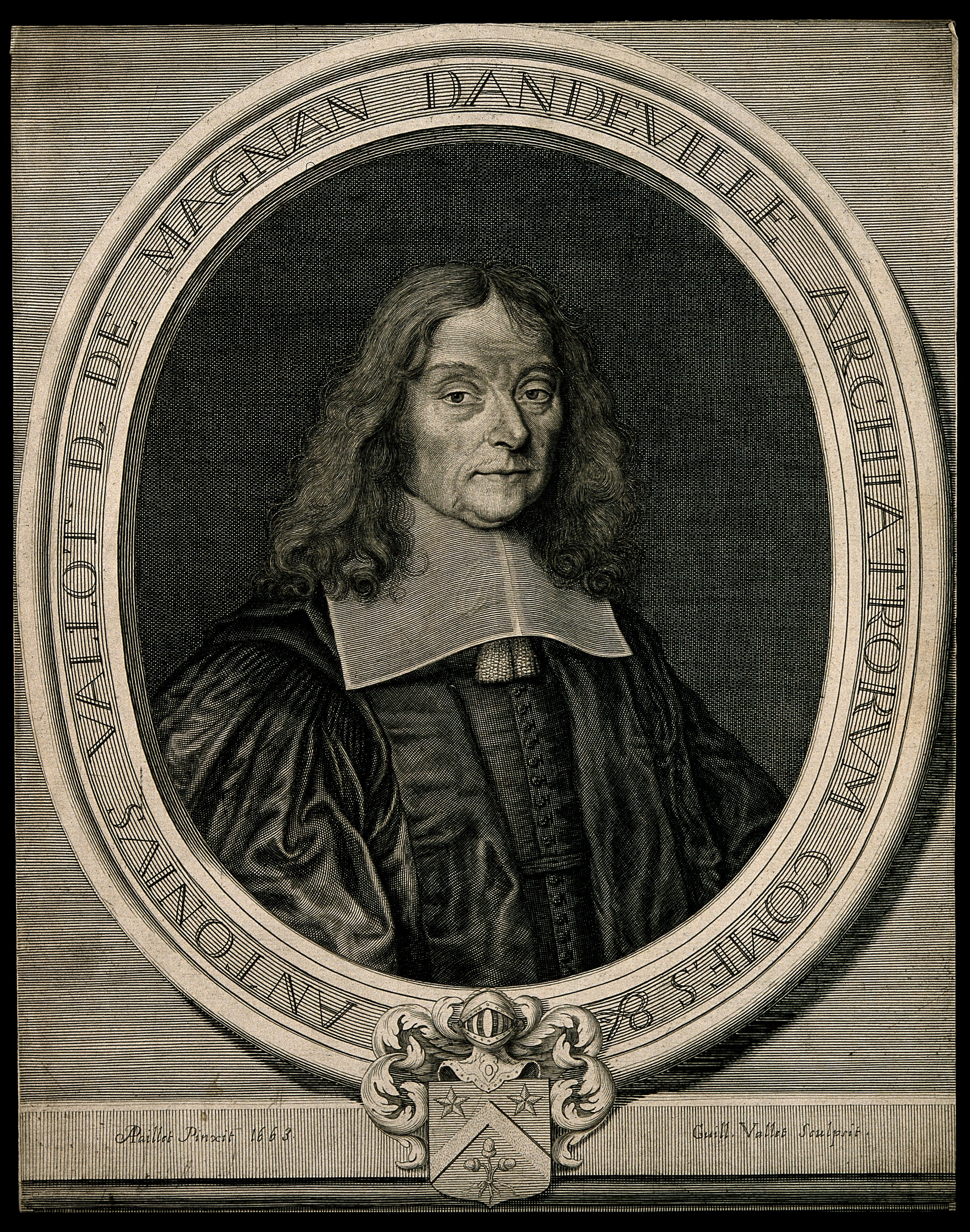
Engraving of Antoine Vallot, gravure de A. Paillet, 1663.

=== Superintendent of the King's Garden ===
As first physician to the king, Vallot was in charge of the Jardin du Roi, in Paris. But it happened that when Vaultier died, the imbroglio of superintendent of the King's Garden had not yet been settled.

== Publications ==
Vallot, d'Aquin, Fagon - Health journal of King Louis XIV from the year 1647 to the year 1711, with introduction, notes, critical reflections and supporting documents by JA Le Roi - Paris - Auguste Durand, editor - 1862
