= Philippe d'Aquin =

Philippe d'Aquin born Mordekhaï Crescas (often Italianate in Judah Mordecai) (Carpentras, 1578 - Paris, 1650), was a French physician, hebraist, philologist and orientalist.

== Biography ==
He was born at Carpentras in the Province of Provence about 1578 and died in Paris in 1650. Son of a Jewish second-hand dealer, his original name was Mordekhaï Crescas (or Mardochée Cresque) and early in life, he left his native town to study medicine for a few years without ever obtaining a degree. He was excommunicated from his religious community for having disregarded the obligation on Saturday and for this reason, went to Aquino, where he became converted to Catholic Church and changed his name to Philippe d'Aquin.

In 1610 he went to Paris and was appointed by Louis XIII professor of the Hebrew and Aramaic language at the Royal College.

He also worked as a doctor with Marie de Medici and Concino Concini and was mentioned among the accusers in the proceedings for "the crime of Judaism". In 1617, d'Aquin was a witness for the prosecution in the trial against Concini, Marquis d'Ancre, and his wife Léonora Galigai in whose household he had occupied some subordinate position for witchcraft and "Jewishness".

D'Aquin is the father of Louis-Henri d'Aquin (or Daquin), and founded a dynasty which gave in particular doctors of the king and bishops. Particularly relevant was his grandson Antoine d'Aquin who was Louis XIV's personal physician.

He became particularly famous for his philological works which concern the Hebrew language and the rabbinical and Kabbalistic traditions. D'Aquin participated in the development of the polyglot Bible by Guy Michel Lejay, produced between 1628 and 1645, dedicating himself in particular to the writing of the New Testament in Hebrew.

== Works ==
- "Primigenæ Voces, seu Radices Breves Linguæ Sanctæ" (Paris, 1620).
- "Pirḳe Aboth, Sententiæ Rabbinorum, Hebraice cum Latina Versione" (Paris, 1620); a Hebrew-Italian edition, under the title "Sentenze: Parabole di Rabbini. Tradotti da Philippo Daquin," appeared in the same year in Paris and was reprinted in Paris in 1629.
- "י"ג מדות, Veterum Rabbinorum in exponendo Pentateucho Modi tredecim" (Paris, 1620).
- "Dissertation du Tabernacle et du Camp des Israélites" (Paris, 1623; 2d ed., 1624).
- "Interpretatio Arboris Cabbalisticæ" (Paris, 1625 on the "Tree of life" of the Kabbalists).
- "Beḥinat 'Olam. (L'Examen du Monde)" of Yedaiah Bedersi, Perpignan rabbi XIVth century, Hebrew and French (Paris, 1629).
- "Ma'arik ha-Ma'areket, Dictionarium Hebraicum, Chaldaicum, Talmudico-Rabbinicum" (Paris, 1629).
- "Ḳina, Lacrimæ in Obitum Cardinalis de Berulli," Hebrew and Latin (Paris, 1629).
