= Christo-Paganism =

Syncretic new religious movement

A Celtic cross with a pentacle within, representing Christo-Paganism

Christo-Paganism is a syncretic new religious movement defined by the combination of Christian and neopagan practices and beliefs.

== Beliefs and practices ==
Christo-Paganism is a set of beliefs held by some neopagans that encompasses Christian teachings. Christo-Pagans may identify as witches, druids, or animists. Most, but not all, worship the Christian God as the supreme God while also believing in many other lesser deities who are subordinated to him. Some Christo-Pagans may consider the Virgin Mary to be a goddess, or a form of the Goddess. Christo-Pagans typically believe in the divinity of Jesus, and that Christian and neopagan beliefs are not mutually exclusive. Some Christians who convert to neopaganism are hesitant to entirely give up their original faiths, and thus become Christo-Pagans.

Some Christo-Pagans use rosaries and prayer beads, and pray to non-Christian deities, such as Persephone. Some may also practice ceremonial magic or magick. There are Christian priests who identify as Christo-Pagan.

== See also ==
- Christianity and paganism
- Christian mysticism
- Christian views on magic
- Esoteric Christianity
- Gnosticism
- Semitic neopaganism
- Slavic Native Faith and Christianity
