= Christianity and paganism =

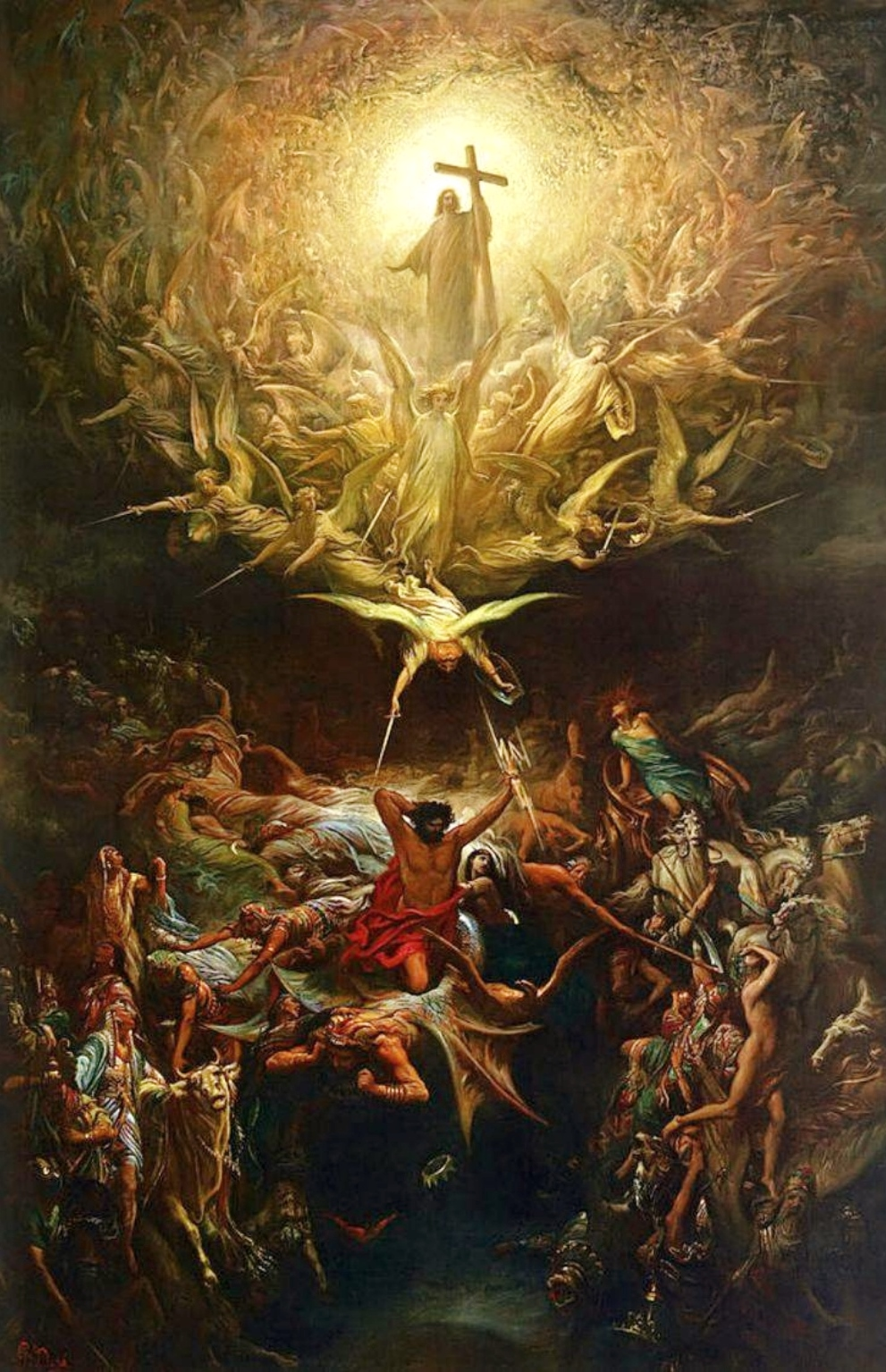
The Triumph of Christianity over Paganism, a painting by Gustave Doré (1899)

Paganism is commonly used to refer to various religions that existed during Antiquity and the Middle Ages, such as the Greco-Roman religions of the Roman Empire, including the Roman imperial cult, the various mystery religions, religious philosophies such as Neoplatonism and Gnosticism, and more localized ethnic religions practiced both inside and outside the empire. During the Middle Ages, the term was also adapted to refer to religions practiced outside the former Roman Empire, such as Germanic paganism, Egyptian paganism and Baltic paganism.

From the point of view of the early Christians, these religions all qualified as ethnic (or gentile, ethnikos, gentilis, the term translating goyim, later rendered as paganus) in contrast with Second Temple Judaism. By the Early Middle Ages (800–1000), faiths referred to as pagan had mostly disappeared in the West through a mixture of peaceful conversion, natural religious change, persecution, and the military conquest of pagan peoples; the Christianization of Lithuania in the 15th century is typically considered to mark the end of this process.

== Early history ==
Early Christianity arose as a movement within Second Temple Judaism and Hellenistic Judaism, following the teachings of Jesus of Nazareth. With a missionary commitment to both Jews and Gentiles (non-Jews), Christianity rapidly spread into the greater Roman empire and beyond. Here, Christianity came into contact with the dominant Pagan religions. Acts 19 recounts a riot that occurred in Ephesus, instigated by silversmiths who crafted images of Artemis, and were concerned that Paul's success was cutting into their trade. These conflicts are recorded in the works of the early Christian writers such as Justin Martyr as well as hostile reports by writers including Tacitus and Suetonius.

The pattern for the Roman state's response to what was seen as a religious threat was established in 186 BC. Roman officials became suspicious of the worshippers of Dionysus and their practice of Bacchanalia because it "took place at night" (also a later Christian practice). Magic and secret plots against the emperor were seen as products of the night. Bacchic associations were dissolved, leaders were arrested and executed, women were forbidden to hold important positions in the cult, no Roman citizen could be a priest, and strict control of the cult was thereafter established. In the first century of the common era, there were "periodic expulsions of astrologers, philosophers and even teachers of rhetoric... as well as Jews and...the cult of Isis". Druids also received this treatment, as did Christians.

=== Persecution of early Christians ===
Christianity was persecuted by Roman imperial authorities early on in its history within the greater empire. By the early part of the 2nd century AD Christians were no longer viewed as forming a breakaway sect of Judaism, but were considered as belonging to just another of many foreign cults which had infiltrated the Empire. They gradually became conspicuous by their absence from festival activities where ritual sacrifices for the health of the emperor and well-being of the empire took place, behavior that carried a "whiff of both sacrilege and treason".

==== Persecution under Nero, 64–68 AD ====
The first documented case of imperially supervised persecution of the Christians in the Roman Empire begins with Nero (37–68). In AD 64, a great fire broke out in Rome, destroying portions of the city and economically devastating the Roman population. Nero himself was suspected as the arsonist by Suetonius. In his Annals, Tacitus (who claimed Nero was in Antium at the time of the fire's outbreak), stated that "to get rid of the report, Nero fastened the guilt and inflicted the most exquisite tortures on a class hated for their abominations, called Christians, or Chrestians, by the populace" (Tacit. Annals XV, see Tacitus on Jesus). Suetonius, later to the period, does not mention any persecution after the fire, but in a previous paragraph unrelated to the fire, mentions punishments inflicted on Christians, defined as men following a new and malefic superstition. But Suetonius did not specify the reasons for the punishment; he just listed the fact together with other abuses put down by Nero.

==== Persecution from the 2nd century to Constantine ====
Drawing of the Alexamenos graffito, c. 200

The Persecution in Lyon was preceded by mob violence, including assaults, robberies and stonings (Eusebius, Ecclesiastical History 5.1.7). Further state persecutions were desultory until the 3rd century, though Tertullian's Apologeticus of 197 was ostensibly written in defense of persecuted Christians and addressed to Roman governors.

Although there was sporadic local persecution, there was no empire-wide persecution of Christians until the reign of Decius in the mid-3rd century AD. A decree was issued requiring public sacrifice, a formality equivalent to a testimonial of allegiance to the Emperor and the established order. Christians who refused were charged with impiety and punished by arrest, imprisonment, torture, and/or executions. Some Christians complied and purchased their certificates, called libelli, which certified their compliance; others fled to safe havens in the countryside. Several councils held at Carthage debated the extent to which the community should accept lapsed Christians.

==== The Diocletianic Persecution ====
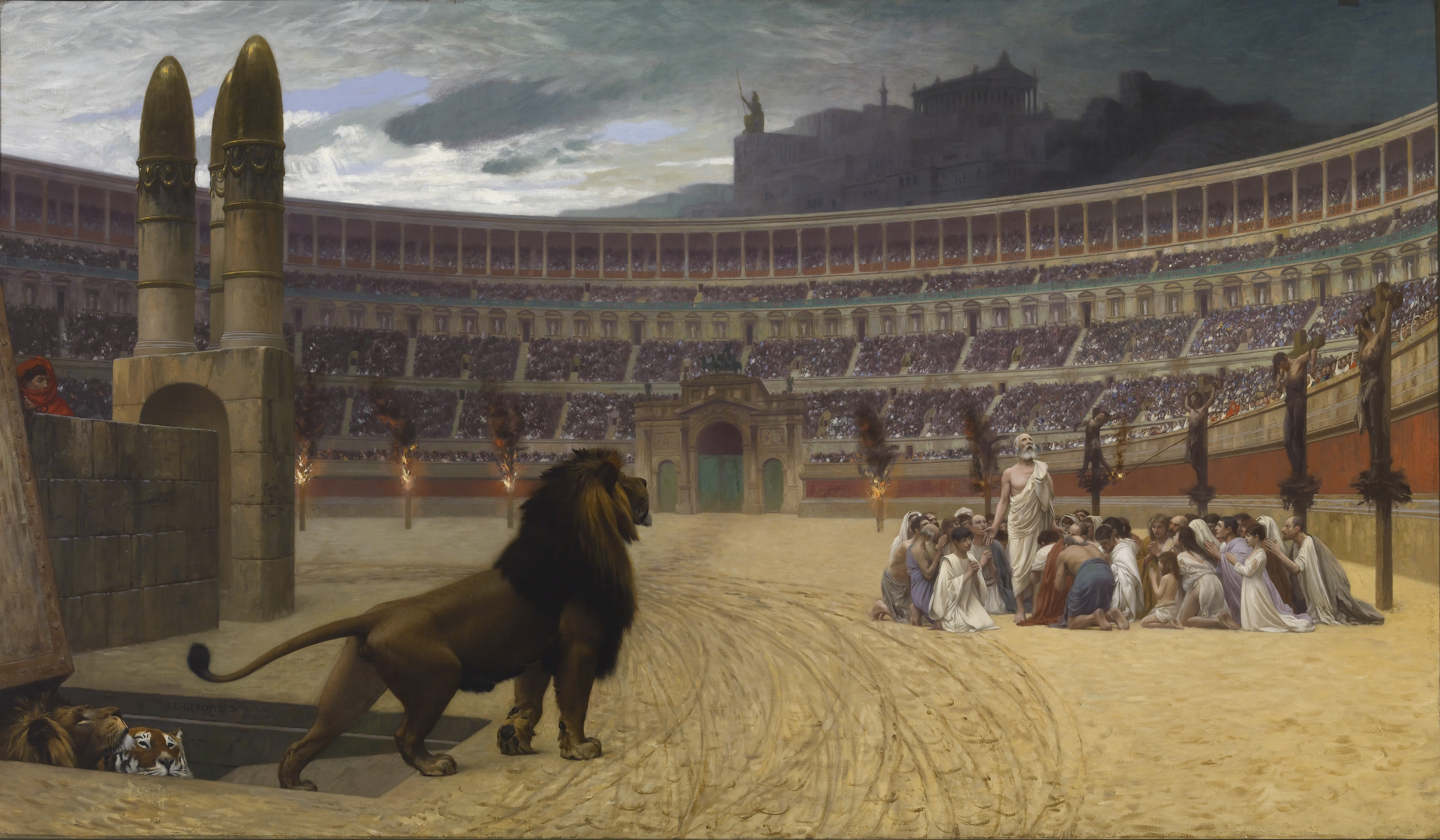
The Christian Martyrs' Last Prayer by Jean-Léon Gérôme (1883)

The persecutions culminated with Diocletian and Galerius at the end of the third and beginning of the 4th century. Beginning with a series of four edicts banning Christian practices and ordering the imprisonment of Christian clergy, the persecution intensified until all Christians in the empire were commanded to sacrifice to the gods or face immediate execution. This persecution lasted until Constantine I, along with Licinius, legalized Christianity in 313. The New Catholic Encyclopedia states that "Ancient, medieval and early modern hagiographers were inclined to exaggerate the number of martyrs. Since the title of martyr is the highest title to which a Christian can aspire, this tendency is natural". Attempts at estimating the numbers involved are inevitably based on inadequate sources.

The failure of the Great Persecution of Diocletian was regarded as a confirmation of a long process of religious self-assertion against the conformism of a pagan empire. Freedom to assert a belief not recognized by the State was won and held. 'However much Christian churches and states may have sinned in later times by their religious coercion, the martyrdoms of the Roman Persecutions belong to the history of freedom.

=== Prohibition and persecution of paganism in the Roman Empire ===
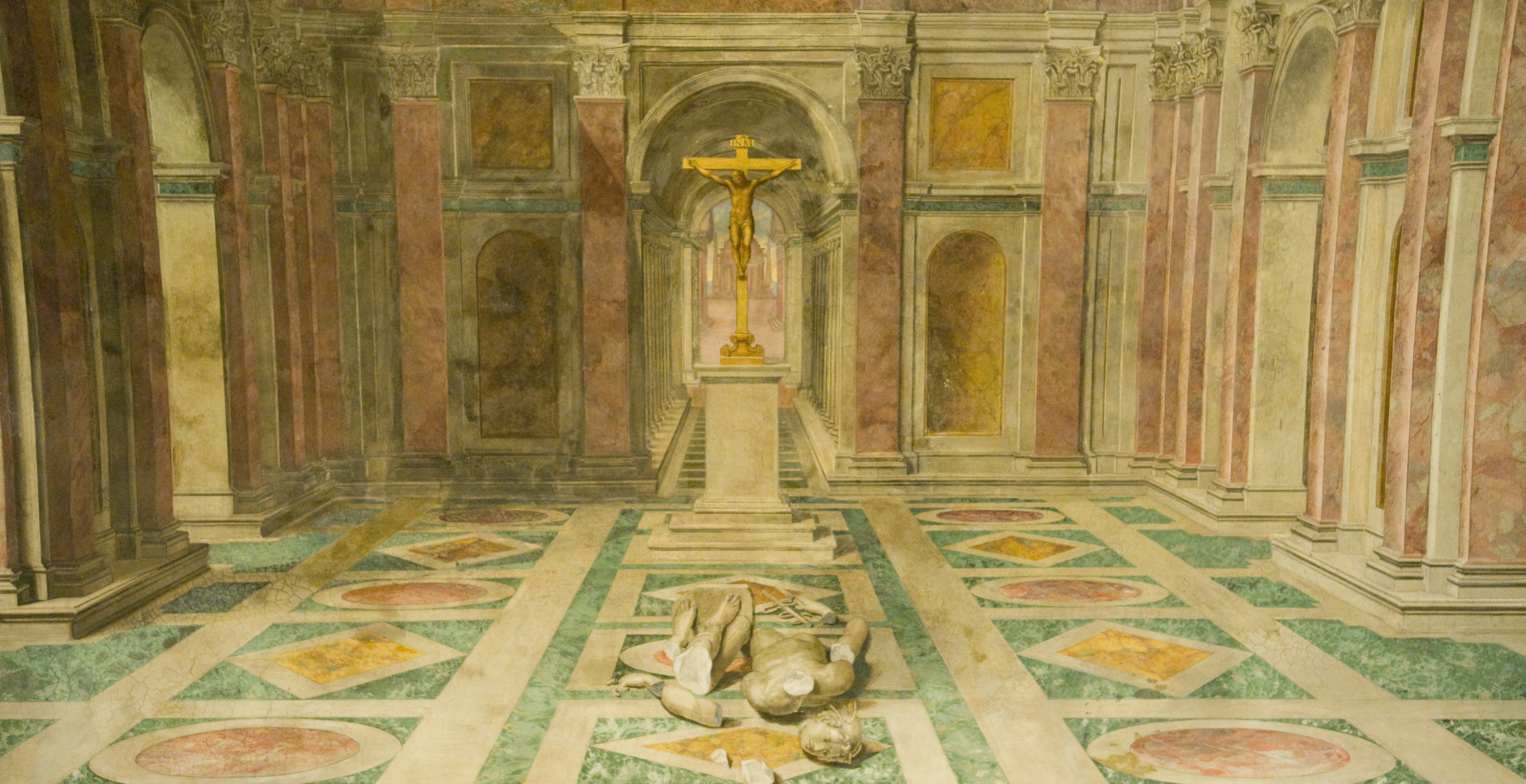
Triumph of Christian religion (over paganism) by Tommaso Laureti (1582), Vatican Palace

According to Rodney Stark, since Christians most likely formed only sixteen to seventeen percent of the empire's population at the time of Constantine's conversion, they did not have the numerical advantage to form a sufficient power–base to begin a systematic persecution of pagans. However, Brown reminds us "We should not underestimate the fierce mood of the Christians of the fourth century", nor should it be forgotten that repression, persecution and martyrdom do not generally breed tolerance of those same persecutors. Brown says Roman authorities had shown no hesitation in "taking out" the Christian church which they saw as a threat to the peace of the empire, and that Constantine and his successors did the same for the same reasons. Rome had been removing anything it saw as a challenge to Roman identity since Bacchic associations were dissolved in 186 BCE. That military action against a mystical religion became the pattern for the Roman state's response to anything it saw as a religious threat. That position of the state toward internal threats did not change once the emperors were Christian.

Within this environment, Christians of the fourth century also believed the conversion of Constantine (traditionally 312) showed that Christianity had triumphed over paganism (in Heaven) and little further action against pagans was necessary; everything was done but the sweeping up in the Christian view. As a result, the fourth century included a focus on heresy as a higher priority than paganism. According to Brown, "In most areas, polytheists were not molested, and apart from a few ugly incidents of local violence, Jewish communities also enjoyed a century of stable, even privileged, existence".

After Constantine, except for the brief period of Julian's rule, paganism never regained its previous status as a state religion. Yet despite its inferior status in the Christian Empire, paganism still existed and was practiced. Up to the time of Justin I and Justinian, there was some toleration for all religions; there were anti-pagan and anti-heretical laws, but they were not generally enforced. Thus, up through the sixth century, there still existed centers of paganism in Athens, Gaza, Alexandria, and elsewhere.

==== Constantine ====
The Edict of Milan of 313 finally legalized Christianity, and it gained governmental privileges, such as tax exemptions to Christian clergy, and a degree of official approval under Constantine. Constantine destroyed a few temples and plundered more, converted others to churches, and neglected the rest; he "confiscated temple funds to help finance his own building projects", and in an effort to establish a stable currency, so he was primarily interested in hoards of gold and silver, but he also confiscated temple land; he refused to support pagan beliefs and practices while also speaking out against them; he periodically forbade pagan sacrifices and closed temples, made laws that threatened and menaced pagans while other laws markedly favored Christianity, and he personally endowed Christians with gifts of money, land and government positions.

As the emperor, he openly supported Christianity after 324, but there are indications he also remained tolerant of pagans. He never engaged in a purge. Opponents' supporters were not slaughtered when Constantine took the capital; their families and court were not killed. There were no pagan martyrs. Laws menaced death, but during Constantine's reign, no one suffered the death penalty for violating anti-pagan laws against sacrifice. There is no evidence of judicial killings for illegal sacrifices before Tiberius Constantine (574–582), and many temples remained open into the reign of Justinian I (527-565). Peter Leithart says of Constantine that, "He did not punish pagans for being pagans, or Jews for being Jews, and did not adopt a policy of forced conversion." Pagans remained in important positions at his court. Constantine ruled for 31 years and never outlawed paganism.

All records of anti-pagan legislation by Constantine are found in the Life of Constantine, written by Eusebius, as a kind of eulogy after Constantine's death. It is not a history so much as a panegyric praising Constantine. The laws as they are stated in the Life of Constantine often do not correspond, "closely, or at all", to the text of the Codes themselves. Eusebius gives these laws a "strongly Christian interpretation by selective quotation or other means". This has led many to question the veracity of the record, and whether, in his zeal to praise Constantine, Eusebius generously attributed actions to Constantine that were not actually his.

==== Gratian ====
In 382, Gratian was the first Roman emperor to formally, in law, divert into the crown's coffers those public financial subsidies that had previously supported Rome's cults; he appropriated the income of pagan priests and the Vestal Virgins, forbid their right to inherit land, confiscated the possessions of the priestly colleges, and was the first to refuse the title of Pontifex Maximus. The colleges of pagan priests lost privileges and immunities. He also ordered the Altar of Victory to be removed again.

Gratian and Ambrose, the Bishop of Milan, exchanged multiple letters and books on Christianity, and the sheer volume of these writings has often been seen as evidence that Gratian was dominated by Ambrose. Ambrose, therefore, was the 'true source' of Gratian's anti-pagan actions. McLynn finds this unlikely and unnecessary as an explanation: Gratian was, himself, devout, and "The many differences between Gratian's religious policies and his father's, and the shifts that occurred during his own reign, are to be explained by changed political circumstances [after the Battle of Adrianople], rather than capitulation to Ambrose".

Modern scholars have noted that Sozomen is the only ancient source that shows Ambrose and Gratian having any personal interaction. In the last year of Gratian's reign, Ambrose crashed Gratian's private hunting party in order to appeal on behalf of a pagan senator sentenced to die. After years of acquaintance, this indicates Ambrose did not personally feel he had enough influence to take for granted that Gratian would grant a request to see him. Instead, Ambrose had to resort to such maneuverings to make his appeal. Gratian's brother, Valentinian II, and his mother disliked Ambrose, but Valentinian II also refused to grant requests from pagans to restore the Altar of Victory and the income of the temple priests and Vestal Virgins.

Between 382 and 384, there was yet another dispute over the Altar of Victory. According to the Oxford Handbook of Late Antiquity, Symmachus requested the restoration of the altar that Gratian had removed and the restoration of state support for the Vestals. Ambrose campaigned against any financial support for paganism throughout his entire career, and anything like the Altar that required participation in blood sacrifices was anathema. Ambrose responded to Symmachus' and his arguments prevailed; the requests were denied. Pagans became outspoken in their demands for respect, concessions and support from the state, voicing their resentment in historical works, such as the writings of Eunapius and Olympiodorus.

After Gratian, the emperors Arcadius, Honorius and Theodosius continued to appropriate for the crown the tax revenue collected by the temple custodians, though this may have been more about the empire's ongoing financial difficulties than religion. Urban ritual procession and ceremony was gradually stripped of support and funding. Rather than being removed outright though, many festivals were secularized, and later, these were incorporated into a developing Christian calendar (often with little alteration). Some had already severely declined in popularity by the end of the 3rd century.

==== Theodosius ====
In the Eastern Empire, up until the time of Justinian, the Byzantine emperors practiced a policy of tolerance toward all religions. This pertained to both devotions to the Greco-Roman gods and the religion of barbarians living within the empire. Although there were anti-pagan laws, there is no record of their harsh punishments ever being enforced. As the eastern emperor, Theodosius seems to have practiced this same type of cautious policy from the beginning of his reign. Theodosius declared Nicene Christianity the official religion of the empire, though this was aimed more at the local Arians in Constantinople than the pagans. For pagans, he reiterated his Christian predecessors' bans on animal sacrifice, divination, and apostasy, but allowed other pagan practices to be performed publicly and temples to remain open. He also turned pagan holidays into workdays, but the festivals associated with them continued.

There is evidence that Theodosius took care to prevent the empire's still substantial pagan population from feeling ill-disposed toward his rule. Following the death in 388 of his praetorian prefect, Cynegius, who had, contrary to Theodosius' spoken policies, vandalized a number of pagan shrines and temples in the eastern provinces, Theodosius replaced him with a moderate pagan who subsequently moved to protect the temples. During his first official tour of Italy (389–391), the emperor won over the influential pagan lobby in the Roman Senate by appointing its foremost members to important administrative posts. Theodosius also nominated the last pair of pagan consuls in Roman history (Tatianus and Symmachus) in 391.

Classicist Ingomar Hamlet says that, contrary to popular myth, Theodosius did not ban the Olympic games. Sofie Remijsen indicates there are several reasons to conclude the Olympic games continued after Theodosius and came to an end under Theodosius II instead. Two scholia on Lucian connect the end of the games with a fire that burned down the temple of the Olympian Zeus during his reign.

===== Legislation =====
A number of laws against pagan sacrifice, and against heresy, were issued towards the end of Theodosius' reign in 391 and 392.

Anti-pagan legislation reflects what Brown calls "the most potent social and religious drama" of the fourth-century Roman empire. From Constantine forward, the Christian intelligentsia wrote of Christianity as fully triumphant over paganism. It did not matter that they were still a minority in the empire, this triumph had occurred in Heaven; it was evidenced by Constantine; but even after Constantine, they wrote that Christianity would defeat, and be seen to defeat, all of its enemies – not convert them. As Peter Brown says, "Conversion was not the principal aim of a social order that declared the God-given dominance of Christianity".

The laws were not intended to convert; "the laws were intended to terrorize... Their language was uniformly vehement, and... frequently horrifying". Their intent was to reorder society along religious lines with the 'triumphant' Christian church in charge, and pagans and Jews at the outskirts of influence, so that laws could be made that were sufficiently intimidating to enable Christianity to put a stop to animal sacrifice. Blood sacrifice was the element of pagan culture most abhorrent to Christians. If they could not stop the private practice of sacrifice, they could "hope to determine what would be normative and socially acceptable in public spaces". Altars used for sacrifice were routinely smashed by Christians who were deeply offended by the blood of slaughtered victims as they were reminded of their own past sufferings associated with such altars.

Blood sacrifice was a central rite of virtually all religious groups in the pre-Christian Mediterranean, and its gradual disappearance is one of the most significant religious developments of late antiquity. ... Public sacrifices and communal feasting had declined as the result of a decline in the prestige of pagan priesthoods and a shift in patterns of [private donations] in civic life. That shift would have occurred on a lesser scale even without the conversion of Constantine... It is easy, nonetheless, to imagine a situation in which sacrifice could decline without disappearing. Why not retain, for example, a single animal victim in order to preserve the integrity of the ancient rite? The fact that public sacrifices appear to have disappeared completely in many towns and cities must be attributed to the atmosphere created by imperial and episcopal hostility.

By the time the pro-pagan emperor Julian (r. 360–363) made his trip through Asia Minor to Antioch to assemble an army and resume war against Persia, opposing sacrifice had become the norm among the people. Julian reached Antioch on July 18 which coincided with a pagan festival that had already become secular: it did not include sacrifice. Julian's preference for blood sacrifice found little support, and the citizens of Antioch accused Julian of "turning the world upside down" by reinstituting it, calling him "slaughterer". "When Julian restored altars in Antioch, the Christian populace promptly threw them down again". Julian succeeded in marching to the Sassanid capital of Ctesiphon, but during the Battle of Samarra, he was mortally wounded. The facts of his death have become obscured by the "war of words between Christians and pagans" which followed. It was "principally over the source of the fatal spear... The thought that Julian might have died by the hand of one of his own side... was a godsend to a Christian tradition eager to have the apostate emperor accorded his just deserts. Yet such a rumor was not solely the product of religious polemic. It had its roots in the broader trail of disaffection Julian left in his wake".

One of the first things that is important about this, in Malcolm Errington's view, is how much anti-pagan legislation was applied and used, which would show how dependable the laws are as a reflection of what actually happened to pagans in history. Brown says that, given the large numbers of non-Christians in every region at this time, local authorities were "notoriously lax" in imposing them. Christian bishops also frequently obstructed their application. The harsh imperial edicts had to face the vast following of paganism among the population, and the passive resistance of governors and magistrates, thereby limiting their impact. Limiting, but not eliminating impact altogether, as Anna Leone says, "Temple closures and the prohibition of sacrifices had an impact... After AD 375 the majority of [pagan] religious offices disappear completely from the epigraphic record".

Secondly, the laws reveal the emergence of a language of intolerance. The legal language runs parallel to the writings of the apologists, such as Augustine of Hippo and Theodoret of Cyrrhus, and heresiologists such as Epiphanius of Salamis. Christian writers and imperial legislators both drew on a rhetoric of conquest. These writings were commonly hostile and often contemptuous toward a paganism Christianity saw as already defeated.

Lastly, on the one hand the laws, and these Christian sources with their violent rhetoric, have had great influence on modern perceptions of this period by creating an impression of continuous violent conflict that has been assumed on an empire-wide scale. Archaeological evidence, on the other hand, indicates that, outside of violent rhetoric, there were only isolated incidents of actual violence between Christians and pagans. Non-Christian, (non-heretical), groups such as pagans and Jews enjoyed a tolerance based on contempt through most of Late Antiquity.

===== Temple destruction =====
It has been common for much of scholarship to attribute rampant temple destruction to Theodosius through his prefect, Maternus Cynegius. Cynegius did commission the destruction of temples, using the army under his control and nearby monks, especially in the territory around Constantinople in the diocese of Oriens (the East). Peter Brown says that in 392, inspired by the mood created by Cynegius, Theophilus of Alexandria staged a procession ridiculing statues of pagan gods. Political complications contributed to turning it into a riot, and the Serapium in Alexandria, Egypt was destroyed. Some scholars think this is when the philosopher Hypatia was killed, (though there is evidence this happened in 415 instead). These examples were seen as the 'tip of the iceberg' by earlier scholars who saw these events as part of a tide of violent Christian iconoclasm that continued throughout the 390s and into the 400s.

Problems with this view have arisen in the twenty-first century. Archaeological evidence for the violent destruction of temples in the fourth century, from around the entire Mediterranean, is limited to a handful of sites. Temple destruction is attested to in 43 cases in the written sources, but only 4 of them have been confirmed by archaeological evidence.

In Gaul, only 2.4% of over 500 known temples and religious sites were destroyed by violence, some of it barbarian. In Africa, the city of Cyrene has good evidence of the burning of several temples; Asia Minor has produced one weak possibility; in Greece the only strong candidate may relate to a barbarian raid instead of Christians. Egypt has produced no archaeologically confirmed temple destructions from this period except the Serapeum. In Italy there is one; Britain has the highest percentage with 2 out of 40 temples.

Trombley and MacMullen say part of why discrepancies between literary sources and archaeological evidence exist is because it is common for details in the literary sources to be ambiguous and unclear. For example, Malalas claimed Constantine destroyed all the temples, then he said Theodisius destroyed them all, then he said Constantine converted them all to churches. "According to Procopius, in the 530s Justinian destroyed the temples of Philae widely identified as the last bastion of paganism in Egypt. But no priests are attested to after the 450s, Christianity was thriving there from the early fourth century, and the temples themselves are among the best preserved in the ancient world".

Archaeology suggests that religious buildings were subject to three different directions of change during the imperial period: early abandonment, destruction and re-use. The financial struggles begun in the third century continued on into the fourth century to negatively impact available funding to maintain the large temple complexes and their festivals. Lower budgets, with less spent on statuary, monuments, and simple maintenance, meant the physical decline of urban structures of all types. Many Temples were left to fall into disrepair and in many instances, such as in Tripolitana, this happened before any Christian anti-pagan legislation could have been a factor. (Note: Economic struggles meant a "substantially poorer quality of life" from the fourth century onward, and demolition of temples was expensive (if destruction was not the result of natural phenomena like earthquakes or floods). Active destruction of temples by humans was rare. It was not carried out unless it became necessary. Archaeological evidence for the violent destruction of temples in the fourth and early fifth centuries around the entire Mediterranean is limited to a handful of sites.)

Progressive early decay was accompanied by an increased trade in statuary and salvaged building materials, as the practice of recycling became common in Late Antiquity, resulting in their complete destruction and removal. "Even churches were reused in similar ways". Some temple restorations took place throughout the imperial period, but there is no evidence of state participation or support. Restorations were funded and accomplished privately.

Overall data indicates that a number of elements coincided to end the Temples, but none of them were strictly religious. The economy, necessity, and political expressions of power were the primary driving forces for the destruction and conversion of pagan religious monuments. Lavan says: "We must rule out most of the images of destruction created by the [written sources]. Archaeology shows the vast majority of temples were not treated this way".

==== Temple conversion ====
Some scholars have long asserted that not all temples were destroyed but were instead converted to churches throughout the empire. According to modern archaeology, 120 pagan temples were converted to churches in the whole empire, out of the thousands of temples that existed, and only about 40 of them are dated before the end of the fifth century. R. P. C. Hanson says the direct conversion of temples into churches did not begin until the mid fifth century in any but a few isolated incidents. In Rome the first recorded temple conversion was the Pantheon in 609. None of the churches attributed to Martin of Tours can be proven to have existed in the fourth century.

==== Rival literature ====
Some pagans blamed the Christian hegemony for the 410 Sack of Rome, while Christians in turn blamed the pagans, provoking Saint Augustine, a Christian bishop, to respond by writing The City of God, a seminal Christian text. It is alleged that Christians destroyed almost all pagan political literature and threatened to cut off the hands of any copyist who dared to make new copies of the offending writings. Yet there is no evidence any Christian in authority ever "actually punished the expression of pagan sentiments" and there is no known prosecution of any pagan work. Many pagan poets and writers were popular among the still classically educated Christian elite, for example, Seneca was referenced 13 times in Augustine's City of God.

=== Mob violence ===
Mob violence was an occasional problem in all the independent cities of the empire. There were no police forces as such. Taxes, food and politics were common reasons for rioting. Religion was also a factor though it is difficult to separate from politics since they were intertwined in all aspects of life. In 361, the murder of the Arian bishop George of Cappadocia was committed by a mob of pagans, although there is evidence he had cruelly provoked them; the conflict over the Serapeum involved both a Christian and a pagan mob; the Jews and the Christians each gathered to fight in 415, although the sources indicate it was the upper levels of the Jewish community who decided to massacre the Christians after Cyril made serious threats to their leadership. A Christian mob threw objects at Orestes and, finally, Hypatia was killed by a Christian mob though politics and personal jealousy were probably the primary causes. Mobs were composed of lower-class urban dwellers, upper class educated pagans, Jews and Christians, and in Alexandria, monks from the monastery of Nitria.

== Pagan influences on early Christianity ==
=== Art ===
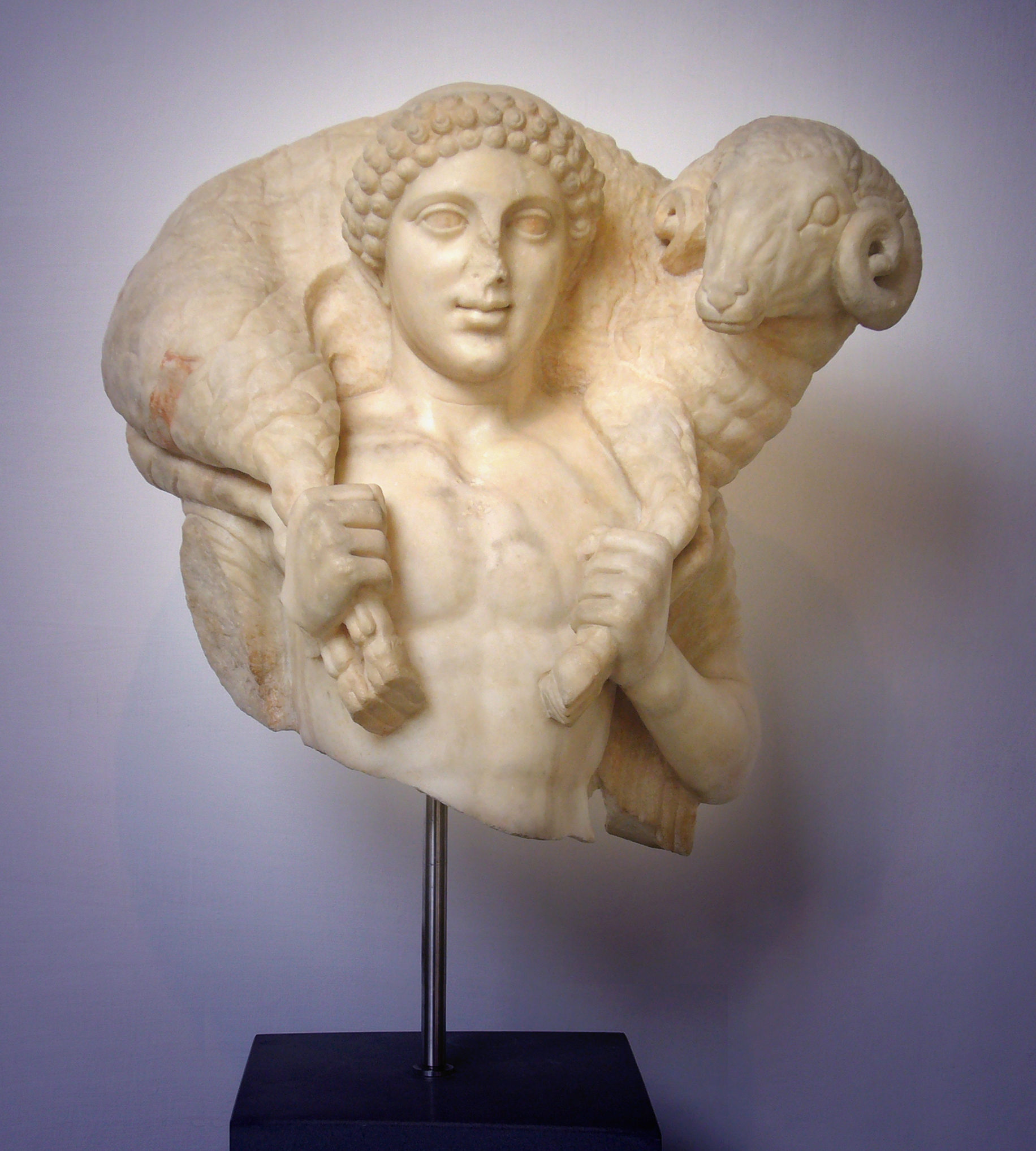
Hermes Kriophoros

The early Christians adapted many elements of paganism. Ancient pagan funeral rituals often remained within Christian culture as aspects of custom and community with very little alteration. A type of song sung at death, the ritual lament, is one of the oldest of all art forms. As soon as death was imminent, the ritual began, then came the "struggle of the soul" and prayer for the dying. John Chrysostum gives a vivid account of the dying soul seeing angels and demons – "account books in hand" – struggling against each other in a contest for possession of the dying person's soul. Macarius of Egypt (fourth century) writes of such a contest which is only resolved by the intervention of the person's guardian angel – which is roughly parallel to Plato's daimon.

Spontaneous lamentation would break out among those present once the struggle of the soul was over. All evidence suggests this was a violent display of grief – the laceration of the cheeks, tearing one's hair, and the rending of garments along with the wailing of the lament song. The church saw this immoderate behavior as improper for people who believed death was not the end, so they attempted to moderate it by singing Psalms, with two groups of singers on opposite sides chanting an antiphonal lament, with rhythm, harmony and order instead. However, this too is similar to the pagan lament sung for Achilles and one suggested by Plato for his Examiners in the Laws.

Pagans and Jews decorated their burial chambers, so Christians did as well, thereby creating the first Christian art in the catacombs beneath Rome. This art is symbolic, rising out of a reinterpretation of Jewish and pagan symbolism. Christian piety infused the symbols with its own fresh interpretation. Christian art had something fundamentally new to say as it gave visual expression to the conviction that the human soul can be delivered from death to an everlasting life. Neither Judaism nor any pagan religion had previously made such a claim. "The Jewish faith puts little emphasis on immortality, and pagan beliefs about the afterlife were vague, uncertain, and sometimes dismal".

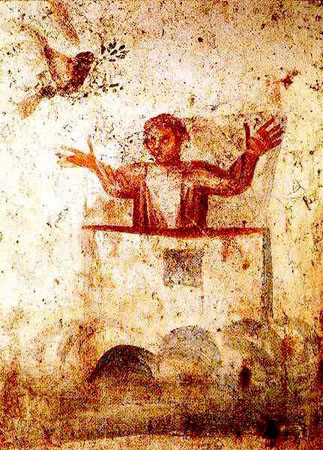
Noah catacomb (orans)

While many new subjects appear for the first time in the Christian catacombs – i.e. the Good Shepherd, Baptism, and the Eucharistic meal – the Orant figures (women praying with upraised hands) probably came directly from pagan art. Pagan symbolism in the form of Victories, cupids, and shepherd scenes are scattered throughout the catacombs. Jewish and pagan use of sheep and goats, birds in a tree or vine, or eating fruit, especially grapes, seven steps leading up to a tomb, a pair of peacocks, the Robe of sanctity, the reading of scrolls, are all found in pagan art and adapted in the Christian art to express the hope of immortality in Christian terms. Pagan sarcophagi had long carried shells, and portraits of the dead often had shells over the head of the dead, while some put a shell over a grave. Christians and Jews adapted the convention, identifying it with another symbol – the halo. For the Christians who made the catacombs, these symbols were necessary to convey their message.

Many previously pagan holy places were converted to Christian use. In 609 Pope Boniface IV obtained leave from the Byzantine Emperor Phocas to convert the Pantheon in Rome into a Christian church, a practice similar to that recommended eight years earlier by Pope Gregory I to Mellitus regarding Anglo-Saxon holy places, in order to ease the transition to Christianity. According to Willibald's Life of Saint Boniface, about 723, the missioner cut down the sacred Donar's Oak and used the lumber to build a church dedicated to St. Peter. Around 744, Saint Sturm established the monastery of Fulda on the ruins of a 6th-century Merovingian royal camp, destroyed 50 years earlier by the Saxons, at a ford on the Fulda River.

=== Calendar ===
Many names for months and days of the week – even the concept of a seven-day week – were borrowed from Roman paganism.

In its first three centuries, Christianity did not celebrate the birth of Christ. Birthdays were seen as pagan, no one knew Jesus's true birthdate, and many early church fathers were against the idea. The earliest source giving December 25 as Jesus's birthdate is the Chronograph of 354, which liturgical historians generally agree was written in Rome in AD 336. A supposedly earlier reference by Hippolytus of Rome is considered a later interpolation. In the ancient Roman calendar, December 25 was the date of the winter solstice.

A widely-held theory is that the Church chose December 25 as Christ's birthday (Dies Natalis Christi) to appropriate the Roman winter solstice festival Dies Natalis Solis Invicti (birthday of Sol Invictus, the 'Invincible Sun'), held on the same date. This festival had been instituted by the emperor Aurelian in AD 274. Gary Forsythe, Professor of Ancient History, says "This celebration would have formed a welcome addition to the seven-day period of the Saturnalia (December 17–23), Rome's most joyous holiday season since Republican times, characterized by parties, banquets, and exchanges of gifts". Historian Stephen Nissenbaum says this choice was a compromise with paganism, arguing there is no avoiding "Roman midwinter parties and Christianity's conscious decision to place a Christmas celebration right in the middle of them" as part of that compromise. Many observers schooled in the classical tradition have noted similarities between the Saturnalia and historical revelry during the Twelve Days of Christmas and the Feast of Fools. William Warde Fowler notes: "[Saturnalia] has left its traces and found its parallels in great numbers of medieval and modern customs, occurring about the time of the winter solstice."

Some way or another, Christmas was started to compete with rival Roman religions, or to co-opt the winter celebrations as a way to spread Christianity, or to baptize the winter festivals with Christian meaning in an effort to limit their [drunken] excesses. Most likely all three.

John the Baptist was said to be six months older than Jesus, thus the Church began holding the feast of the Nativity of John the Baptist on 24 June, the Roman date of the summer solstice. John the Baptist "was understood to be preparing the way for Jesus", with John 3:30 stating "He must increase, but I must decrease". The sun's height in the sky and length of the day begins to decrease after the summer solstice and to increase after the winter solstice. Thus 'Johnmas' was held at midsummer and 'Christmas' at midwinter. With the spread of Christianity, some of the local Germanic Midsummer traditions were incorporated into St John's Eve festivities.

Another theory, first proposed by French writer Louis Duchesne in 1889, is that Christmas was calculated as nine months after a date chosen as Christ's conception: March 25, the Roman date of the spring equinox. This is based on a belief that the spring equinox was the day of God's act of Creation.

While attending Crozer Theological Seminary c.1950, Martin Luther King Jr. wrote an essay titled "The Influence of the Mystery Religions on Christianity". King noted that the place at Bethlehem selected by early Christians as Jesus's birthplace was an early shrine of a pagan god, Adonis. After the Bar Kokhba revolt (c. 132–136 CE) was crushed, the Roman emperor Hadrian converted the Christian site above the Grotto into a shrine dedicated to the Greek god Adonis, to honour his favourite, the Greek youth Antinous.

=== Influence on early Christian theology ===
Justin Martyr was a pagan who became a Christian around 132. In his First Apology, Justin used the concept of the "Logos" as a way of arguing for Christianity to non-Jews. These references demonstrate that Justin's knowledge of Stoicism was the knowledge of an ordinary man of his time in ordinary conversation, and that it is unlikely he ever studied Stoicism. However, he calls himself a Platonist, his references to Plato are much more detailed, and parallels to Plato's writings can be found in Justin's, though they do not suggest direct influence. Since a Greek audience would accept references to Greek philosophy, his argument could concentrate on identifying the Logos with Jesus. Scholars generally recognize that Clement went much farther, perhaps the farthest "any Orthodox Christian ever did in his appropriation and use of Hellenistic philosophical and ethical concepts for the expression of his Christian faith".

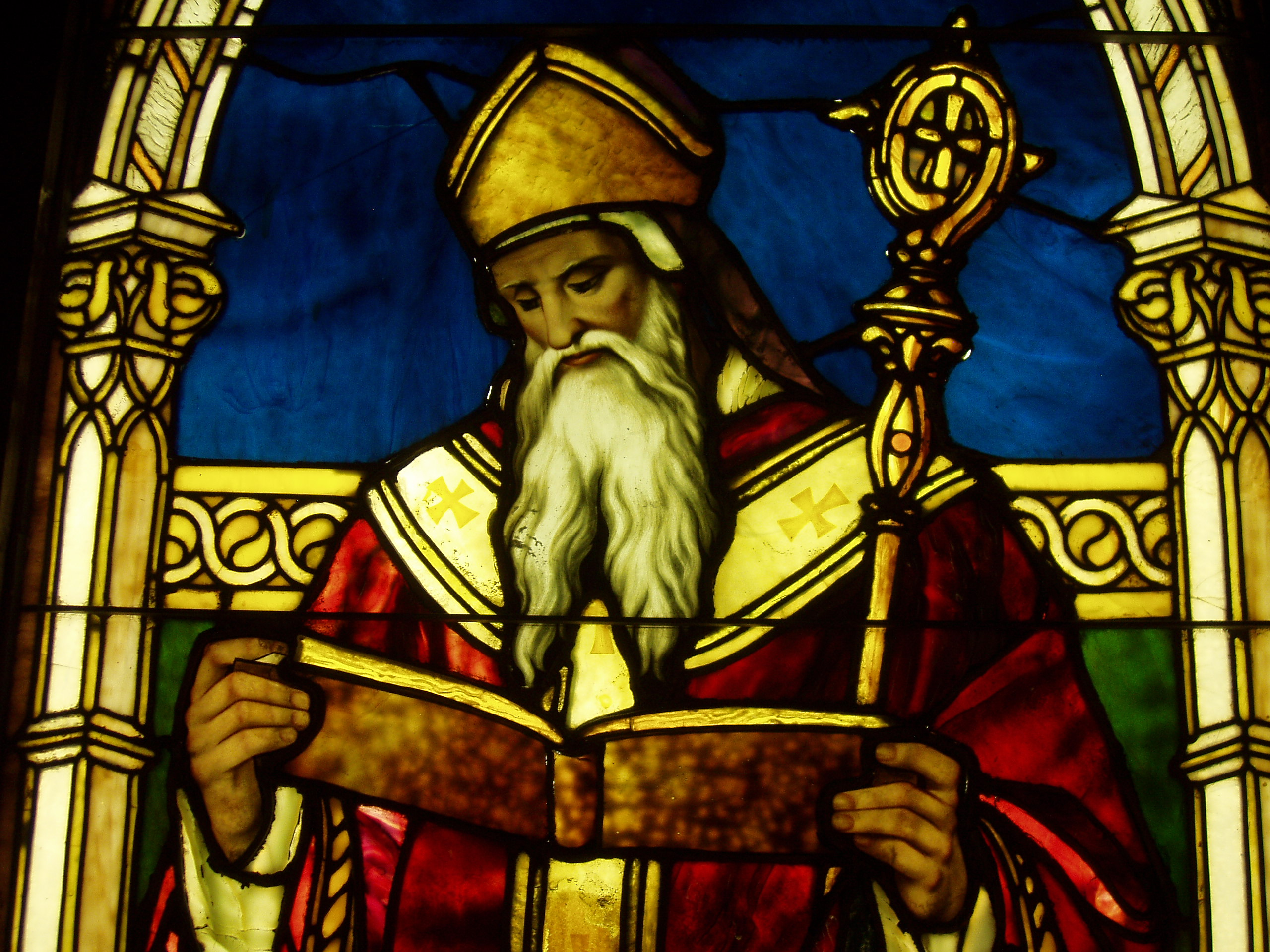
Augustine of Hippo

Augustine of Hippo (354–430), who ultimately systematized Christian philosophy after converting to Christianity from Manichaeism, wrote in the late 4th and early 5th century: "But when I read those books of the Platonists I was taught by them to seek incorporeal truth, so I saw your 'invisible things, understood by the things that are made'." Until the 20th century, most of the Western world's concept of Manichaeism came through Augustine's negative polemics against it. According to his Confessions, after eight or nine years of adhering to the Manichaean faith (as an "auditor", the lowest level in the sect's hierarchy), he became a Christian and a potent adversary of Manichaeism. When he turned from Manichaeism, he took up skepticism. In AD 386, he published Contra Academicos (Against the Skeptics). J. Brachtendorf says Augustine used the Ciceronian Stoic concept of passions to interpret Paul's doctrine of universal sin and redemption.

The influence of paganism can also be found in the development of many non-Orthodox theologies such as the Cathars of the Middle Ages. Cathars were dualists and felt that the world was the work of a demiurge of Satanic origin. Whether this was due to influence from Manichaeism or another strand of Gnosticism, and whether it was originally Zoroastrian has been impossible to determine. The Bogomils and Cathars, in particular, left few records of their rituals or doctrines, and the link between them and Manichaeans is unclear. Regardless of its historical veracity the charge of Manichaeism was leveled at them by contemporary orthodox opponents, who often tried to fit contemporary heresies with those combated by the church fathers. Not all Cathars held that The Evil God (or principle) was as powerful as The Good God (also called a principle) as Mani did, a belief also known as absolute dualism. In the case of the Cathars, it seems they adopted the Manichaean principles of church organization, but none of its religious cosmology. Similarly, Priscillian and his followers apparently tried to absorb what they thought was the valuable part of Manichaeism into Christianity.

== Christianization during the European Middle Ages ==
=== Anatolia ===
A safe area for the pagans was the city of Harran which, despite the persecution of its pagan inhabitants by Byzantine Emperor Maurice, remained a largely pagan city well into the early Islamic period. When the city was besieged by the armies of the Rashidun Caliphate in 639–640, it was the pagan community that negotiated its peaceful surrender. Under the subsequent rule of the caliphates, Harran became a major settlement within the Diyar Mudar region and retained a significant degree of autonomy. During the First Fitna, the people of Harran sided with Mu'awiya I over Ali at the Battle of Siffin in 657, which allegedly resulted in a brutal retaliation by Ali, who massacred much of the population.

Under the Umayyad Caliphate (661–750), Harran prospered and was selected as the capital by the last Umayyad caliph, Marwan II, from 744 to 750. This move may have been influenced by the city's pagan sympathies and its strategic position near the empire's eastern provinces. The city's prominence under Umayyad rule saw it grow as a cultural and scholarly center, with the establishment of the first Muslim university in 717 under Umar II, attracting scholars from across the Islamic world.

Although Harran lost its capital status under the Abbasid Caliphate, it continued to flourish, particularly during the reign of Harun al-Rashid (786–809), when its university became a key center for translation and intellectual activity. The local religion, blending elements of Mesopotamian paganism and Neoplatonism, persisted into the 10th century, though periodic decrees enforced conversions to Islam, especially under Al-Ma'mun in 830. Nonetheless, Harran retained its heterogeneity, with a population that included Muslims, Christians, Jews, and a variety of other religious groups.

=== Anglo-Saxons ===
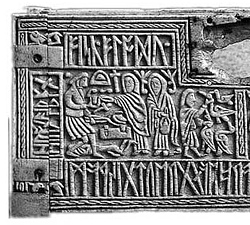
Part of seventh-century casket, depicting the pan-Germanic legend of Weyland Smith, which was apparently also a part of Anglo-Saxon pagan mythology

The most likely date for Christianity getting its first foothold in Britain is sometime around 200. Recent archaeology indicates that it had become an established minority faith by the fourth century. It was largely mainstream, and in certain areas, had been continuous.

In early Anglo-Saxon England, non-stop religious development meant paganism and Christianity were never completely separate. Arthur Weston wrote that, "When Gregory the Great was taking steps for the conversion of the heathen Saxons, he is said to have warned his missionaries not to interfere with any traditional belief or religious observance which could be harmonized with Christianity".

Tell Augustine that he should be no means destroy the temples of the gods but rather the idols within those temples. Let him, after he has purified them with holy water, place altars and relics of the saints in them. For, if those temples are well built, they should be converted from the worship of demons to the service of the true God. Thus, seeing that their places of worship are not destroyed, the people will banish error from their hearts and come to places familiar and dear to them in acknowledgement and worship of the true God.

Further, since it has been their custom to slaughter oxen in sacrifice, they should receive some solemnity in exchange. Let them therefore, on the day of the dedication of their churches, or on the feast of the martyrs whose relics are preserved in them, build themselves huts around their one-time temples and celebrate the occasion with religious feasting. They will sacrifice and eat the animals not any more as an offering to the devil, but for the glory of God to whom, as the giver of all things, they will give thanks for having been satiated. Thus, if they are not deprived of all exterior joys, they will more easily taste the interior ones. For surely it is impossible to efface all at once everything from their strong minds, just as, when one wishes to reach the top of a mountain, he must climb by stages and step by step, not by leaps and bounds.

— Bede, Historia ecclesiastica gentis Anglorum (1.30)

Richard A. Fletcher suggests that holy wells developed out of a like adaptation.

The word Easter is linked, by a single documentary source, to an Anglo-Saxon goddess, though the roots of the Easter celebration predate Christian contact with the Anglo-Saxons. In his eighth-century The Reckoning of Time the venerable Bede wrote that "Ēosturmōnaþ was Anglo-Saxon for 'Month of Ēostre', the month that corresponded to April, so-named "after a goddess of theirs named Ēostre, in whose honour feasts were celebrated in that month". The German cognate of the goddess Eostre is called Ostara, and likewise the word for Easter in German is Ostern. Richard Fletcher, however, speculated that the name Easter might come from the Anglo-Saxon eastan, meaning east.

The conversion of the Anglo-Saxons was begun at about the same time in both the north and south of the Anglo-Saxon kingdoms in two unconnected initiatives. Irish missionaries led by Saint Columba, based in Iona (from 563), converted many Picts. The court of Anglo-Saxon Northumbria, and the Gregorian mission, who landed in 596, did the same to the Kingdom of Kent. They had been sent by Pope Gregory I and were led by Augustine of Canterbury with a mission team from Italy. In both cases, as in other kingdoms of this period, conversion generally began with the royal family and the nobility adopting the new religion first.

The conversion of Æthelberht, king of Kent is the first account of any Christian bretwalda conversion and is told by the Venerable Bede in his histories of the conversion of England. In 582 Pope Gregory sent Augustine and 40 companions from Rome to convert the Anglo-Saxons. "They had, by order of the blessed Pope Gregory, brought interpreters of the nation of the Franks, and sending to Æthelberht, signified that they were come from Rome, and brought a joyful message, which most undoubtedly assured to all that took advantage of it everlasting joys in heaven, and a kingdom that would never end with the living and true God." Æthelberht was not unfamiliar with Christianity because he had a Christian wife, and Bede says that there was even a church dedicated to St. Martin nearby. Æthelberht was converted eventually and Augustine remained in Canterbury.

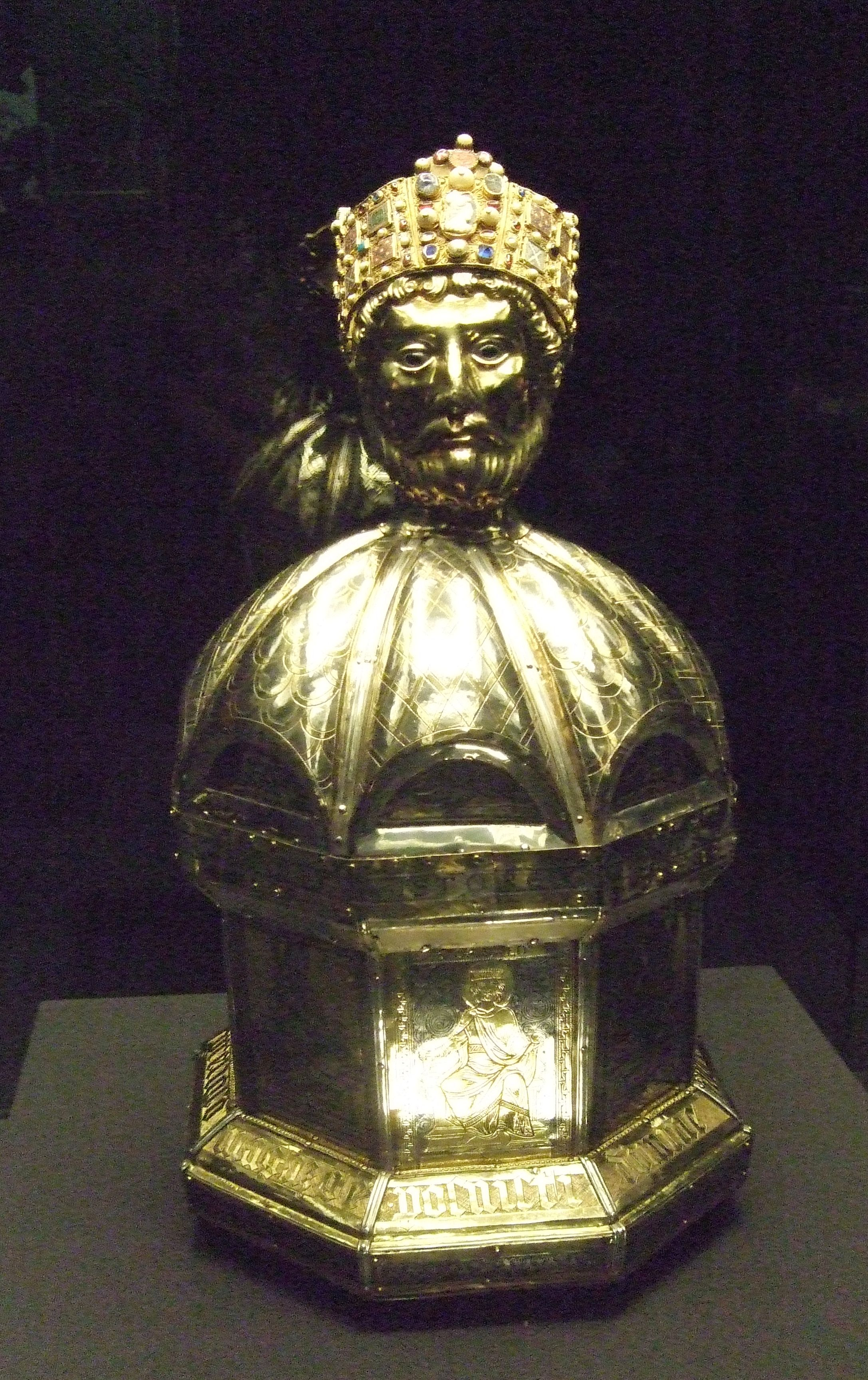
Reliquary of St. Oswald, Hildesheim

After his death, King Oswald of Northumbria came to be regarded as a saint, and the spot where he died was associated with miracles. Reginald of Durham mentions one, saying that Oswald's right arm was taken by a raven to an ash tree, which gave the tree ageless vigor; when the bird dropped the arm onto the ground, a spring emerged from the ground. Both the tree and the spring were, according to Reginald, subsequently associated with healing miracles. Aspects of the legend have been considered to have pagan overtones or influences and may represent a fusion of his status as a traditional Germanic warrior-king with Christianity. The cult surrounding him gained prominence in parts of continental Europe.

Some time prior to 655, Œthelwald of Deira gave Chad of Mercia land upon which to build a monastery. According to Bede, Chad felt it necessary to fast for forty days in order to cleanse the place. This ritual purification indicates that the new monastery was likely built on the site of a pre-Christian cult.

=== Greece ===
Pagan Continuity in Mani and Mistra (800-1100) Christianity was introduced late in Mani, with the first Greek temples converted into churches during the 11th century. Byzantine monk Nikon "the Metanoite" (Νίκων ὁ Μετανοείτε) was sent in the 10th century to convert the predominantly pagan Maniots. Although his preaching began the conversion process, it took over 200 years for the majority to accept Christianity fully by the 11th and 12th centuries. Patrick Leigh Fermor noted that the Maniots, isolated by mountains, were among the last Greeks to abandon the old religion, doing so towards the end of the 9th century:

Sealed off from outside influences by their mountains, the semi-troglodytic Maniots themselves were the last of the Greeks to be converted. They only abandoned the old religion of Greece towards the end of the ninth century. It is surprising to remember that this peninsula of rock, so near the heart of the Levant from which Christianity springs, should have been baptised three whole centuries after the arrival of St. Augustine in far-away Kent.

According to Constantine VII in De Administrando Imperio, the Maniots were referred to as 'Hellenes' and only fully Christianized in the 9th century, despite some church ruins from the 4th century indicating early Christian presence. The region's mountainous terrain allowed the Maniots to evade the Eastern Roman Empire's Christianization efforts, thus preserving pagan traditions, which coincided with significant years in the life of Gemistos Plethon.

=== Saxons ===
The conversion of the northern Saxons began with their forced incorporation into the Frankish kingdom in 776 by Charlemagne (r. 768–814). Thereafter, the Saxon's Christian conversion slowly progressed into the eleventh century. The Saxon conversion was difficult for a number of reasons including that their pagan beliefs were so strongly tied to their culture that conversion necessarily meant massive cultural change that was hard to accept. Their sophisticated theology was also a bulwark against an immediate and complete conversion to Christianity.

Saxons had gone back and forth between rebellion and submission to the Franks for decades. Charlemagne placed missionaries and courts across Saxony in hopes of pacifying the region, but Saxons rebelled again in 782 with disastrous losses for the Franks. In response, the Frankish King "enacted a variety of draconian measures" beginning with the massacre at Verden in 782 when he ordered the decapitation of 4500 Saxon prisoners offering them baptism as an alternative to death. These events were followed by the severe legislation of the Capitulatio de partibus Saxoniae in 785 which prescribes death to those that are disloyal to the king, harm Christian churches or its ministers, or practice pagan burial rites. His harsh methods of Christianization raised objections from his friends Alcuin and Paulinus of Aquileia. Charlemagne abolished the death penalty for paganism in 797.

=== Scandinavia ===
The first recorded attempts at spreading Christianity in Norway were made by King Haakon the Good in the tenth century, who was raised in England. His efforts were unpopular and were met with little success. In 995 Olaf Tryggvason became King Olaf I of Norway. Olaf I then made it his priority to convert the country to Christianity. By destroying temples and torturing and killing pagan resisters he succeeded in making every part of Norway at least nominally Christian. Expanding his efforts to the Norse settlements in the west the kings' sagas credit him with Christianizing the Faroes, Orkney, Shetland, Iceland, and Greenland. After Olaf's defeat at the Battle of Svolder in 1000 there was a partial relapse to paganism in Norway under the rule of the Jarls of Lade. In the following reign of Saint Olaf, pagan remnants were stamped out and Christianity entrenched.

=== Northern Crusades ===
Armed conflict between the Baltic Finns, Balts and Slavs who dwelt by the Baltic shores and their Saxon and Danish neighbors to the north and south had been common for several centuries. The Christianization of the pagan Balts, Slavs and Finns was undertaken primarily during the 12th and 13th centuries, in a series of uncoordinated military campaigns by various German and Scandinavian kingdoms, and later by the Teutonic Knights and other orders of warrior-monks. It was during these Northern Crusades that armed conversion of paganism first became a part of Christianity.

Dragnea and Christiansen indicate the primary motive for these wars was the noble's desire for territorial expansion and material wealth in the form of land, furs, amber, slaves, and tribute. Medieval historian and political scientist Iben Fonnesberg-Schmidt says, the princes were motivated by their desire to extend their power and prestige, and conversion was not always an element of their plans. However, conversion was part of the language for all these invaders, and conversion was almost always by the direct use of force or the indirect force of a leader who had converted and required conversion of his followers as well. There were often severe consequences for populations that chose to resist. For example, the conquest and conversion of Old Prussia resulted in the death of much of the native population, whose language subsequently became extinct.

"While the theologians maintained that conversion should be voluntary, there was a widespread pragmatic acceptance of conversion obtained through political pressure or military coercion." The church's acceptance of this led some commentators of the time to endorse and approve it, something Christian thought had never previously done. Dominican friars helped with this ideological justification. By portraying the pagans as possessed by evil spirits, they could assert the pagans were in need of conquest, persecution and force in order to free them; then they would become peacefully converted. Ideals of peaceful conversion were rarely realized in these crusades; monks and priests had to work with the secular rulers on their terms, and the military leaders seldom cared about allowing the time necessary for peaceful conversion.

== Absorption and erasure of pagan traditions ==
The practice of replacing pagan beliefs and motifs with Christian, and purposefully not recording the pagan history (such as the names of pagan gods, or details of pagan religious practices), has been compared to the practice of damnatio memoriae.

== See also ==
- Christianisation of the Germanic peoples
- Christianity and neopaganism
- Christo-Paganism
- History of Christian thought on persecution and tolerance
- History of early Christianity
- Jesus in comparative mythology
- Neoplatonism and Christianity
- Sol Invictus
- Saint John's Eve
- Virtuous pagan

== Sources ==
- Alexiou, Margaret (2002). Roilos, Panagiotis; Yatromanolakis, Dimitrios (eds.). The Ritual Lament in Greek Tradition. Rowman & Littlefield Publishers. ISBN 9781461645481.
- Bagnall, Roger S.; Alan Cameron; Seth R. Schwartz & Klaas A. Worp (1987). Consuls of the Later Roman Empire. Oxford University Press. ISBN 1-55540-099-X.
- Cameron, Alan (2010). The Last Pagans of Rome. Oxford University Press. ISBN 978-0-19-974727-6.
- Errington, R. Malcolm (1997). "Christian Accounts of the Religious Legislation of Theodosius I". Klio. 79 (2): 398–443. doi:10.1524/klio.1997.79.2.398. S2CID 159619838.
- Errington, R. Malcolm (2006). Roman Imperial Policy from Julian to Theodosius. Chapel Hill: University of North Carolina Press. ISBN 0-8078-3038-0.
- Fletcher, Richard (1999). The Barbarian Conversion: From Paganism to Christianity. Berkeley: University of California Press.
- Forbes, Bruce David (2008). Christmas: A Candid History (illustrated, reprint ed.). University of California Press. p. 26. ISBN 9780520258020.
- Frew, Donald (1999). "Harran: Last Refuge of Classical Paganism". The Pomegranate. 13 (9): 17–29. doi:10.1558/pome.v13i9.17.
- Goodenough, Erwin Ramsdell (1923). The Theology of Justin Martyr. Frommann. hdl:2027/mdp.39015004286335. OCLC 551297346.
- Goodenough, Erwin R. (1962). "Catacomb Art". Journal of Biblical Literature. 81 (2): 113–142. doi:10.2307/3264749. JSTOR 3264749.
- Graf, Fritz (2014). "Laying Down the Law in Ferragosto: The Roman Visit of Theodosius in Summer 389". Journal of Early Christian Studies. 22 (2): 219–242. doi:10.1353/earl.2014.0022.
- Hebblewhite, Mark (2020). Theodosius and the Limits of Empire. London: Routledge. doi:10.4324/9781315103334. ISBN 978-1-138-10298-9.
- McLynn, Neil B. (1994), Ambrose of Milan: Church and Court in a Christian Capital, The Transformation of the Classical Heritage, vol. 22, Berkeley: University of California Press
- Özdeniz, M.B; Bekleyen, A; Gönül, I.A; Gönül, H; Sarigül, H; Ilter, T; Dalkiliç, N; Yildirim, M (December 1998). "Vernacular domed houses of Harran, Turkey". Habitat International. 22 (4): 477–485. doi:10.1016/S0197-3975(98)00027-7.
- Riché, Pierre (1993). The Carolingians : a family who forged Europe. University of Pennsylvania Press. ISBN 0-8122-3062-0.
- Saradi-Mendelovici, Helen (1990). "Christian Attitudes toward Pagan Monuments in Late Antiquity and Their Legacy in Later Byzantine Centuries". Dumbarton Oaks Papers. 44: 47–61. doi:10.2307/1291617. JSTOR 1291617.
- Testa, Judith Anne (1998). "10, The Christian Catacombs". Rome is Love Spelled Backward (Roma Amor): Enjoying Art and Architecture in the Eternal City. Northern Illinois University Press. ISBN 9780875805764.
- Thomas, Charles (1981). Christianity in Roman Britain to AD 500 (illustrated ed.). University of California Press. ISBN 9780520043923.
- Trombley (1995). Hellenic Religion and Christianization c. 370-529, Volume I. doi:10.1163/9789004276772. ISBN 978-90-04-27677-2.
- Trombley (1994). Hellenic Religion and Christianization c. 370-529, Volume II. doi:10.1163/9789004276789. ISBN 978-90-04-27678-9.
- Wood, Ian N. (2007). "Some historical re-identifications and the Christianization of Kent". Christianizing Peoples and Converting Individuals. pp. 27–35.
- Woods, David. "Theodosius I (379–395 A.D.)". De Imperatoribus Romanis.
- Pingree, David (2002). "The Ṣābians of Ḥarrān and the Classical Tradition". International Journal of the Classical Tradition. 9 (1): 8–35. doi:10.1007/BF02901729. JSTOR 30224282. S2CID 170507750.
- Bosworth, C. E. (2003). "ḤARRĀN". Encyclopaedia Iranica, Vol. XII, Fasc. 1. pp. 13–14.
- Joscelyn Godwin, The Pagan Dream Of The Renaissance (US: Weiser Books, 2005,ISBN 978-1578633470)
- J. N. Hillgarth, Christianity and Paganism, 350-750: The Conversion of Western Europe (Philadelphia: University of Pennsylvania Press, 1985, ISBN 978-0812212136)
