= Mandaeans =

Middle Eastern ethnoreligious group

Mandaeans ࡌࡀࡍࡃࡀࡉࡉࡀ الصابئة المندائيون
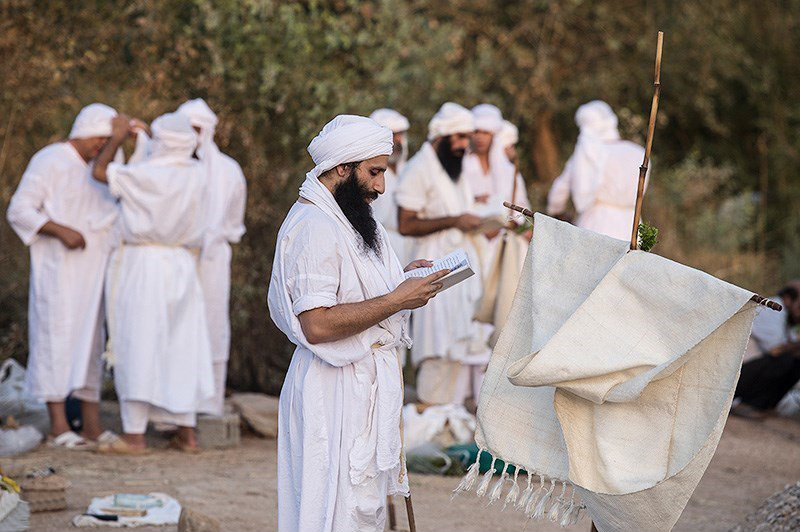
- Mandaeans in prayer, Iran

Total population
- c. 60,000

Regions with significant populations
- Sweden: 12,410
- Australia: 15,000
- United States: 7,000
- Iraq: 3,000
- Netherlands: 4,000
- Iran: 2,000 (2025)
- United Kingdom: 2,500
- Germany: 3,000
- Jordan: 2,500
- Syria: 300 (2025)
- Canada: 1,000
- New Zealand: 1,000
- Denmark: 1,200
- France: 1,000
- Finland: 100 families

Religions
- Mandaeism

Scriptures
- Ginza Rabba, Qulasta, Mandaean Book of John, Haran Gawaita, etc. (see more)

Languages
- Mandaic as liturgical language; Neo-Mandaic; Mesopotamian Arabic (in Iraq, Jordan, Syria and diaspora); Persian (in Iran and diaspora); Swedish, English etc. as a second language in diasporas.

Mandaeans (Mandaic: ࡌࡀࡍࡃࡀࡉࡉࡀ) (Arabic: المندائيون al-Mandāʾiyyūn), also known as Mandaean Sabians (الصابئة المندائيون al-Ṣābiʾa al-Mandāʾiyyūn) or simply as Sabians (الصابئة al-Ṣābiʾa), (Note: After the mysterious Sabians mentioned in the Quran, a name historically claimed by several religious groups. For adherents of other religions sometimes called 'Sabians', see Sabians#Pagan Sabians.) are an ethnoreligious group who are followers of Mandaeism. They believe that John the Baptist was the final and most important prophet.

They may have been among the earliest religious groups to practise baptism, as well as among the earliest adherents of Gnosticism, a belief system of which they are the last surviving representatives. The Mandaeans were originally native speakers of Mandaic, an Eastern Aramaic language, before they nearly all switched to Mesopotamian Arabic or Persian as their main language.

After the invasion of Iraq by the United States and its allies in 2003, the Mandaean community of Iraq, which before the war numbered 60,000–70,000 people, collapsed with most of the community relocating to Iran, Syria and Jordan, or forming diaspora communities beyond the Middle East. By 2007, the population of Mandaeans in Iraq had fallen to approximately 5,000.

The community of Iranian Mandaeans has also been dwindling as a result of religious persecution over the decades. Unlike other religious minorities such as Christians, Jews and Zoroastrians, Mandaeans have no protection from persecution whatsoever, similar to Baháʼís in Iran.

Today, there are estimated to be 60,000–100,000 Mandaeans worldwide. About 10,000 Mandaeans live in Australia and between 10,000 and 20,000 in Sweden, making them the countries with the most Mandaeans. There are about 2,500 Mandaeans in Jordan, the largest Mandaean community in the Middle East outside of Iraq and Iran.

== Etymology ==
The name "Mandaean" comes from the Mandaic word manda, meaning "to have knowledge".

In Muslim countries, Mandaeans are sometimes also called Sabians (Arabic: الصابئة al-Ṣābiʾa), a Quranic epithet historically claimed by several religious groups (see also below). The etymology of the Arabic word Ṣābiʾ is disputed. According to one interpretation, it is the active participle of the Arabic root ṣ-b-ʾ ('to turn to'), meaning 'converts'. Another widely cited hypothesis is that it is derived from an Aramaic root meaning 'to baptize'.

== History ==
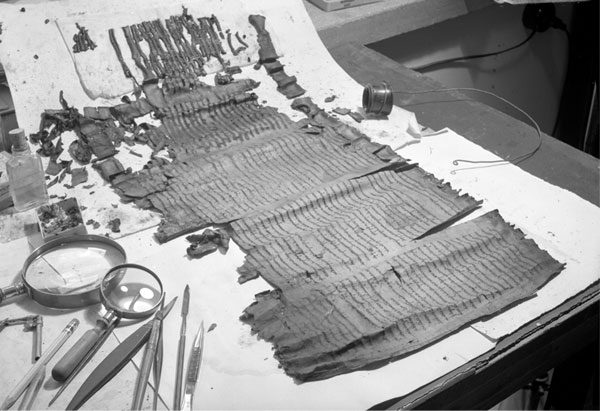
The Genesis Apocryphon, part of the Dead Sea Scrolls

=== Origin ===
According to a theory first proposed by Ignatius of Jesus in the 17th century, the Mandaeans originated in Judea and later migrated east to the Mesopotamian Marshes. This theory was gradually abandoned, but was revived in the early 20th century through the first translation of Mandaean texts, which Biblical scholars like Rudolf Bultmann believed capable of shedding new light on the development of early Christianity. However, most New Testament scholars rejected the Judean origin thesis, which by World War II was again largely deserted by scholars. It was revived in the 1960s by Rudolf Macúch; it is now accepted by Mandaean scholars such as Jorunn Jacobsen Buckley and Şinasi Gündüz. According to Macúch, the eastward migration from the Roman province of Judea to southern Iraq took place in the first century CE, while other scholars such as Kurt Rudolph think it probably took place in the third century.

There are also other theories. Kevin van Bladel has argued that the Mandaeans originated in Sasanian-ruled Mesopotamia in the fifth century. According to Carlos Gelbert, Mandaeans formed a vibrant community in Edessa in late antiquity. Brikha Nasoraia, a Mandaean priest and scholar, accepts a two-origin theory in which he considers the contemporary Mandaeans to have descended from both a line of Mandaeans who had originated from the Jordan Valley, as well as another group of Mandaeans (or Gnostics) who were indigenous to southern Mesopotamia. Thus, the historical merging of the two groups gave rise to the Mandaeans of today.

There are several indications of the ultimate origin of the Mandaeans. Early religious concepts and terminologies recur in the Dead Sea Scrolls, and Yardena (Jordan) has been the name of every baptismal water in Mandaeism. Mara ḏ-Rabuta (Mandaic: "Lord of Greatness", one of the names for Hayyi Rabbi) is found in the Genesis Apocryphon (1Q20) II, 4. They formally refer to themselves as Naṣuraiia (ࡍࡀࡑࡅࡓࡀࡉࡉࡀ), meaning guardians or possessors of secret rites and knowledge. Another early self-appellation is bhiria zidqa, meaning 'elect of righteousness' or 'the chosen righteous', a term found in the Book of Enoch and Genesis Apocryphon II, 4. As Nasoraeans, Mandaeans believe that they constitute the true congregation of bnia nhura, meaning 'Sons of Light', a term used by the Essenes. The bit manda (beth manda) is described as biniana rba ḏ-šrara ("the Great building of Truth") and bit tušlima ("house of Perfection") in Mandaean texts such as the Qulasta, Ginza Rabba, and the Mandaean Book of John. The only known literary parallels are in Essene texts from Qumran such as the Community Rule, which has similar phrases such as the "house of Perfection and Truth in Israel" (Community Rule 1QS VIII 9) and "house of Truth in Israel."

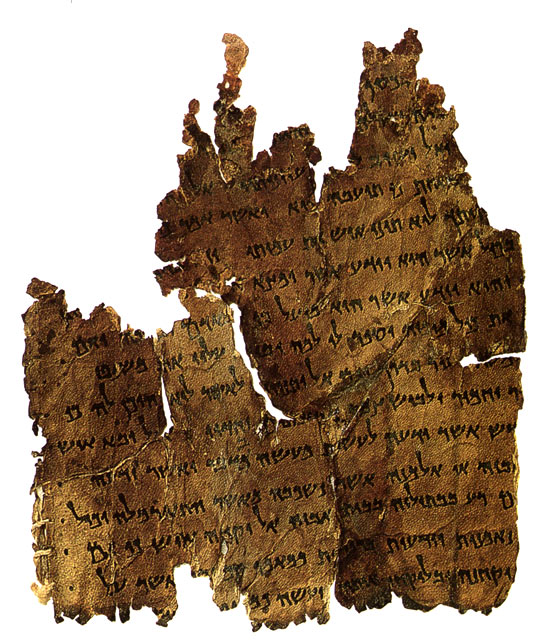
The Damascus Document, part of the Dead Sea Scrolls

The Mandaic language is a Southeastern Aramaic dialect, notable for its abundant use of vowel letters in writing (Mandaic alphabet) and the amount of Iranian and Akkadian language influence on its lexicon, especially in the area of religious and mystical terminology. Mandaic is influenced by Jewish Palestinian Aramaic, Samaritan Aramaic, Hebrew, Greek, Latin, in addition to Akkadian and Parthian.

A priest holds the title of Rabbi and a place of worship is called a Mashkhanna. According to Mandaean sources such as the Haran Gawaita, the Nasuraiia inhabited the areas around Jerusalem and the River Jordan in the 1st century CE. There is archaeological evidence that attests to the Mandaean presence in pre-Islamic Iraq. Scholars, including Kurt Rudolph, connect the early Mandaeans with the Jewish sect of the Nasoraeans. Mandaeans believe that their religion predates Judaism. According to Mandaean scripture, the Mandaeans descend directly from Shem, Noah's son, in Mesopotamia and also from John the Baptist's original Nasoraean Mandaean disciples in Jerusalem. According to the Mandaean Society in America, Mani (the 3rd-century founder of Manichaeism) was influenced by the Mandaeans, and a pre-Manichaean presence of the Mandaean religion is more than likely.

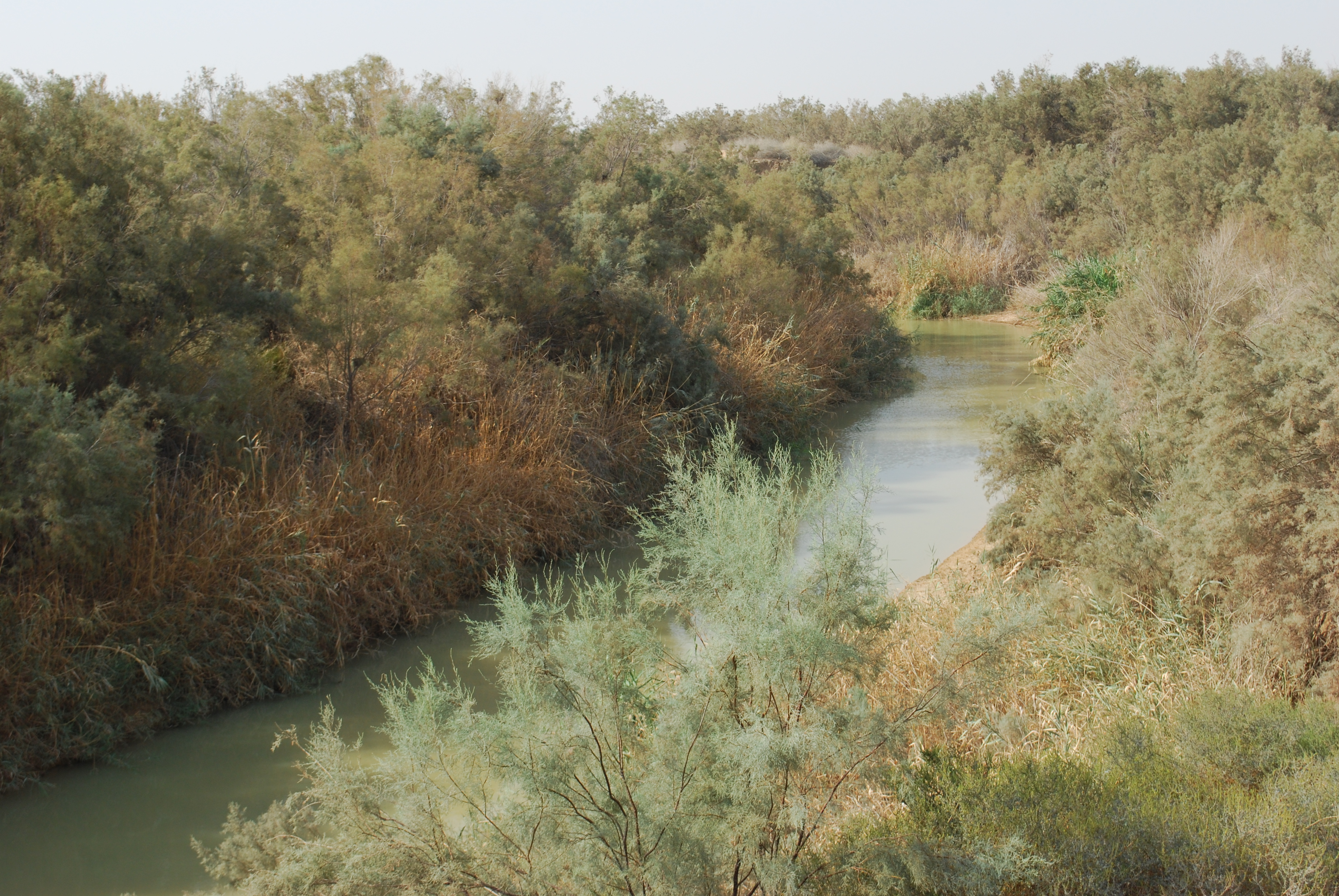
Jordan River

Gerard Russell quotes Rishama Sattar Jabbar Hilo, "Ours is the oldest religion in the world. It dates back to Adam." Russell adds, "He [Rishama Sattar Jabbar Hilo] traced its history back to Babylon, though he said it might have some connection to the Jews of Jerusalem." The Mandaean Synod of Australia led by Rishama Salah Choheili states:

Mandaeans are followers of John the Baptist. Their ancestors fled from the Jordan Valley about 2000 years ago and ultimately settled along the lower reaches of the Tigris, Euphrates and Karun Rivers in what is now Iraq and Iran. Baptism is the principal ceremony of the Mandaean religion and may only take place in a freshwater river.

=== Parthian and Sasanian period ===
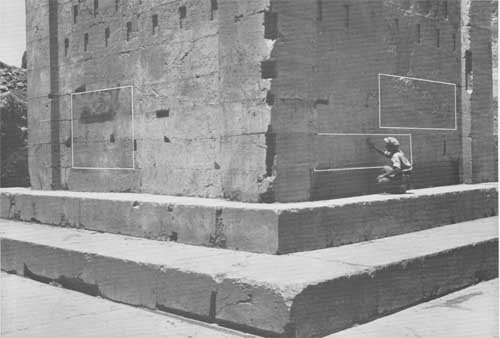
Kartir's inscription at Ka'ba-ye Zartosht claimed that he "struck down" the non-Zoroastrian minorities, such as the Mandaeans

A number of ancient Aramaic inscriptions dating back to the 2nd century CE were uncovered in Elymais. Although the letters appear quite similar to the Mandaean ones, it is impossible to know whether the inhabitants of Elymais were Mandaeans. Rudolf Macúch believes Mandaean letters predate Elymaic ones. Under Parthian and early Sasanian rule, foreign religions were tolerated and Mandaeans appear to have enjoyed royal protection. The situation changed by the ascension of Bahram I in 273, who under the influence of the zealous Zoroastrian high priest Kartir persecuted all non-Zoroastrian religions. It is thought that this persecution encouraged the consolidation of Mandaean religious literature. The persecutions instigated by Kartir seems to temporarily erase Mandaeans from recorded history. Their presence, however can still be found in Mandaean magical bowls and lead strips which were produced from the 3rd to the 7th century.

=== Islamic period ===
The Mandaeans re-emerged at the beginning of the Muslim conquest of Mesopotamia in c. 640, when their leader, Anush bar Danqa, is said to have appeared before the Muslim authorities, showing them a copy of the Ginza Rabba, the Mandaean holy book, and proclaiming the chief Mandaean prophet to be John the Baptist, who is also mentioned in the Quran by the name Yahya ibn Zakariya. Consequently, the Muslim caliph provided them acknowledgement as People of the Book (ahl al-kitāb, adherents of religions recognized as guided by previous revelations). However, this account is likely apocryphal: since it mentions that Anush bar Danqa traveled to Baghdad, it must have occurred after the founding of Baghdad in 762, if it took place at all.

Mandaeans appear to have flourished during the early Islamic period, as attested by the voluminous expansion of Mandaic literature and canons. Tib near Wasit is particularly noted as an important scribal center. Yaqut al-Hamawi describes Tib as a town inhabited by 'Nabatean' (i.e. Aramaic speaking) 'Sabians' (see below) who consider themselves to be descendants of Seth.

The status of the Mandaeans was questioned by the Abbasid caliph al-Qahir Billah (899–950 CE), even though they had received recognition as People of the Book. To avoid further investigation by the authorities, the Mandaeans paid a bribe of 50,000 dinars and were left alone. It appeared that the Mandaeans were even exempt from paying the Jizya, otherwise imposed upon non-Muslims.

It has been suggested by some scholars that Harranian intellectuals who worked at the Abbasid court such as Thābit ibn Qurra may have been Mandaeans, though most scholars believe they were adherents of the pagan astral religion of Harran.

=== Early modern period ===
Early contact with Europeans came about in the mid-16th century, when Portuguese missionaries encountered Mandaeans in Southern Iraq and controversially designated them "Christians of St. John". In the next centuries Europeans became more acquainted with the Mandaeans and their religion.

The Mandaeans suffered persecution under the Qajar rule in the 1780s. The dwindling community was threatened with complete annihilation, when a cholera epidemic broke out in Shushtar and half of its inhabitants died. The entire Mandaean priesthood perished and Mandaeism was restored due to the efforts of few learned men such as Yahya Bihram. Another danger threatened the community in 1870, when the local governor of Shushtar massacred the Mandaeans against the will of the Shah.

=== Modern Iraq and Iran ===
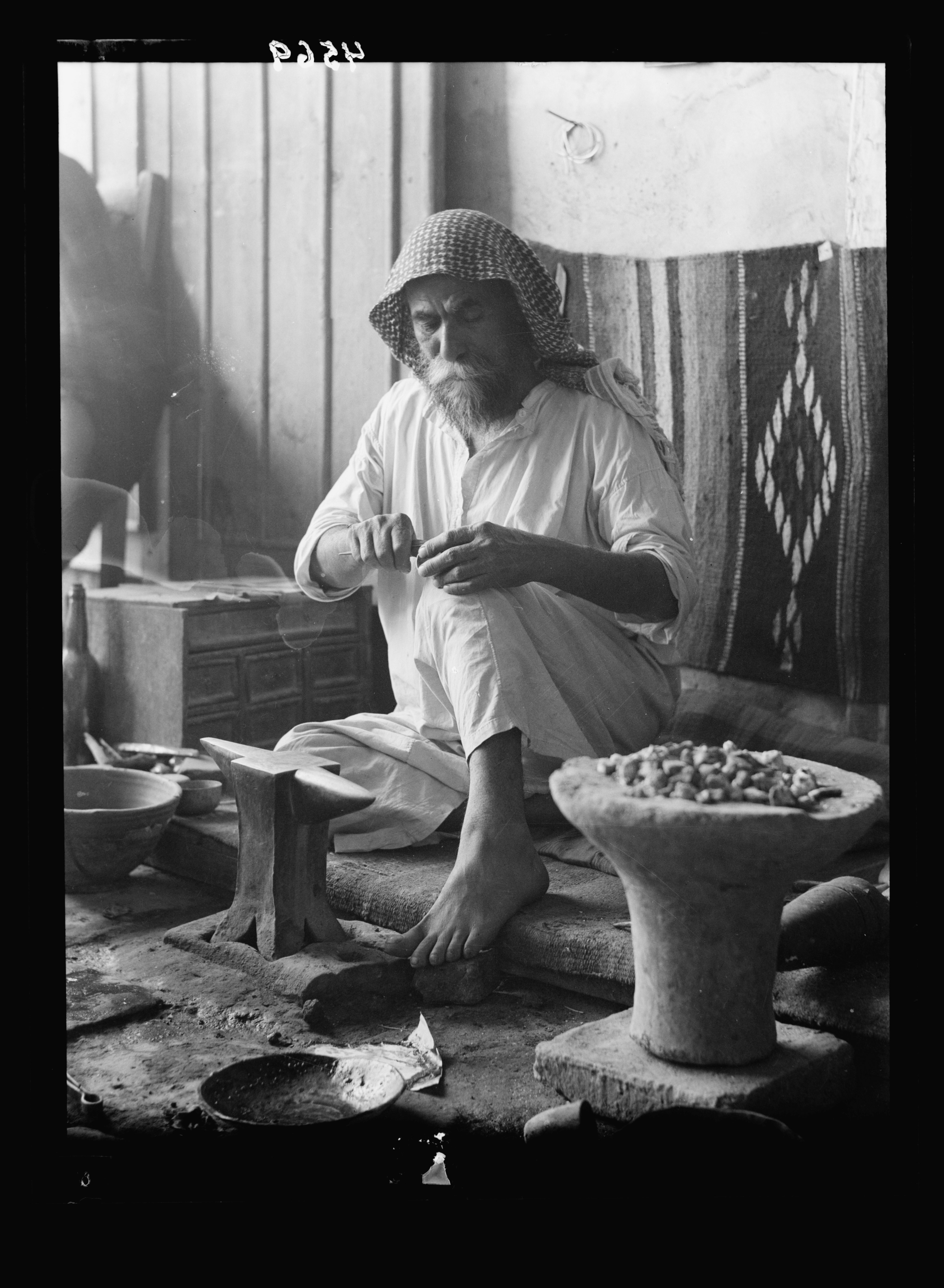
Mandaean silversmith at work in Baghdad, Iraq, 1932

Following the First World War, the Mandaeans were still largely living in rural areas in the lower parts of British protected Iraq and Iran. Owing to the rise of Arab nationalism, Iraqi Mandaeans have seen the increased use of Arabic, with Mandaic being dropped as a language by the Mandaeans. With the rise of secularism in Iraq, more Mandaeans aimed to follow the secular way of life, with a lot of Iraqi Mandaeans abandoning daily baptisms, instead weekly ones, and for some monthly. By the 70s to 80s the Mandaeans were also forced to abandon their stances on the cutting of hair and forced military service, which are strictly prohibited in Mandaeaism.

Mandeans, who mostly lived in rural parts of Maysan Governorate, migrated to large cities such as Baghdad and Basra. This caused a major change in the community, as they transitioned from traditionalism to modernism. The future generation entered the world of politics. Some of them became leaders in the Communist Party. Some of them entered the Baath Party and the rest of the parties. During the time of Abdul Karim Qasim persecution decreased. Later under Saddam Hussein, the Mandaean community flourished in Iraq. They were given permission to practice their religion and the government allocated them lands to build their places of worship. A decree was issued in 1972, allowing Mandeans to have holiday and enjoy during their festivals.

In Iraq, Mandaeans were renowned goldsmiths and silversmiths, particularly in Baghdad, where they operated shops in al-Nahr Street, Shorjah, Qishla, Rusafa, al-Karimat, al-Azramli, and al-Fahhama on the Karkh side. Many Mandaeans also held prominent positions in the government. Lamia Abbas Amara served as Iraq’s cultural attaché and deputy permanent representative to UNESCO in Paris from 1973 to 1975. Poet Abdul Razzaq Abdul was a cultural advisor to the Ministry of Culture and Information, while astronomer Abdul Azim Al-Sabti played a key role in establishing the Erbil Observatory on Mount Korek, the largest observatory in the Middle East. In 2001, Saddam granted them the title of "Golden Sect". He pledged to build more Mandaean temples. Rishama Sattar Jabbar Hilow met Saddam in 2001, an event televised in Iraq. The Sabian–Mandaean Mandi in Baghdad was built on the land donated by the government.

According to local sources, their population until 2003 was 75,000. The 2003 American invasion of Iraq and the war that followed brought more troubles to Mandaeans, as the security situation deteriorated. Many members of the Mandaean community, who were known as goldsmiths, were targeted by criminal gangs for ransoms. The rise of ISIS forced thousands to flee the country, after they were given the choice of conversion or death. It is estimated that around 90% of Iraqi Mandaeans were either killed or have fled after the U.S. led invasion.

The Mandaeans of Iran lived chiefly in Ahvaz, Iranian Khuzestan, but have moved as a result of the Iran–Iraq War to other cities such as Tehran, Karaj and Shiraz. The Mandaeans, who were traditionally considered as People of the Book (members of a protected religion under Islamic rule), lost this status after the Iranian Revolution. However, despite this, Mandaeans still maintain successful businesses and factories in areas such as Ahwaz. In April 1996, the cause of the Mandaeans' religious status in the Islamic Republic was raised. The parliament came to the conclusion that Mandaeans were included in the protected status of People of the Book alongside Christians, Jews and Zoroastrians and specified that, from a legal viewpoint, there is no prohibition against Muslims associating with Mandaeans, whom the parliament identified as being the Sabians mentioned explicitly in the Quran. That same year, Ayatollah Sajjadi of Al-Zahra University in Qom posed three questions regarding the Mandaeans' beliefs and seemed satisfied with the answers. These rulings, however, did not lead to Mandaeans regaining their more officially recognized status as People of the Book. In 2009, Iran's Supreme Leader Ayatollah Ali Khamenei issued a fatwā recognizing the Mandaeans as People of the Book. (Note: The fatwā is numbered differently between Persian (S 322) and its official English (Q 321) translation but reads as follows: س 322. تعداد زیادی از مردم در خوزستان زندگی می کنند که خود را «صابئه» می نامند و ادعای پیروی از پیامبر خدا حضرت یحیی(ع) را دارند و می گویند کتاب او نزد ما موجود است. نزد علمای ادیان ثابت شده که آن ها همان صابئون هستند که در قرآن آمده است. لطفاً بیان فرمایید که این گروه از اهل کتاب هستند یا خیر؟ ج. گروه مذکور در حکم اهل کتاب هستند. Translation of the Persian original: S 322. There are a large number of people living in Khuzestan who call themselves "Ṣābeʾe" and who claim to follow God's holy Prophet Yahya (ʿayn) and say that his book is available to us. It has also been proven by scholars of religions and they are the Ṣābeʾūn mentioned in the Qorʾān. Please state if this group is among the People of the Book [Ahl-e Ketāb] or not? J: The mentioned group are subject to the ruling on People of the Book [ahl-e Ketāb]. Official English translation: Q 321: There live a large number of people in Khuzestan who call themselves Sabeans and claim that they are the followers Prophet Yaḥyā (a.s.) and that they possess his scripture. It has also been established for the religious scholars that they are the Sabeans mentioned in the Qur'an. Please explain whether they are among the People of the Book. A: The rule of the People of the Book is applicable to this group.)

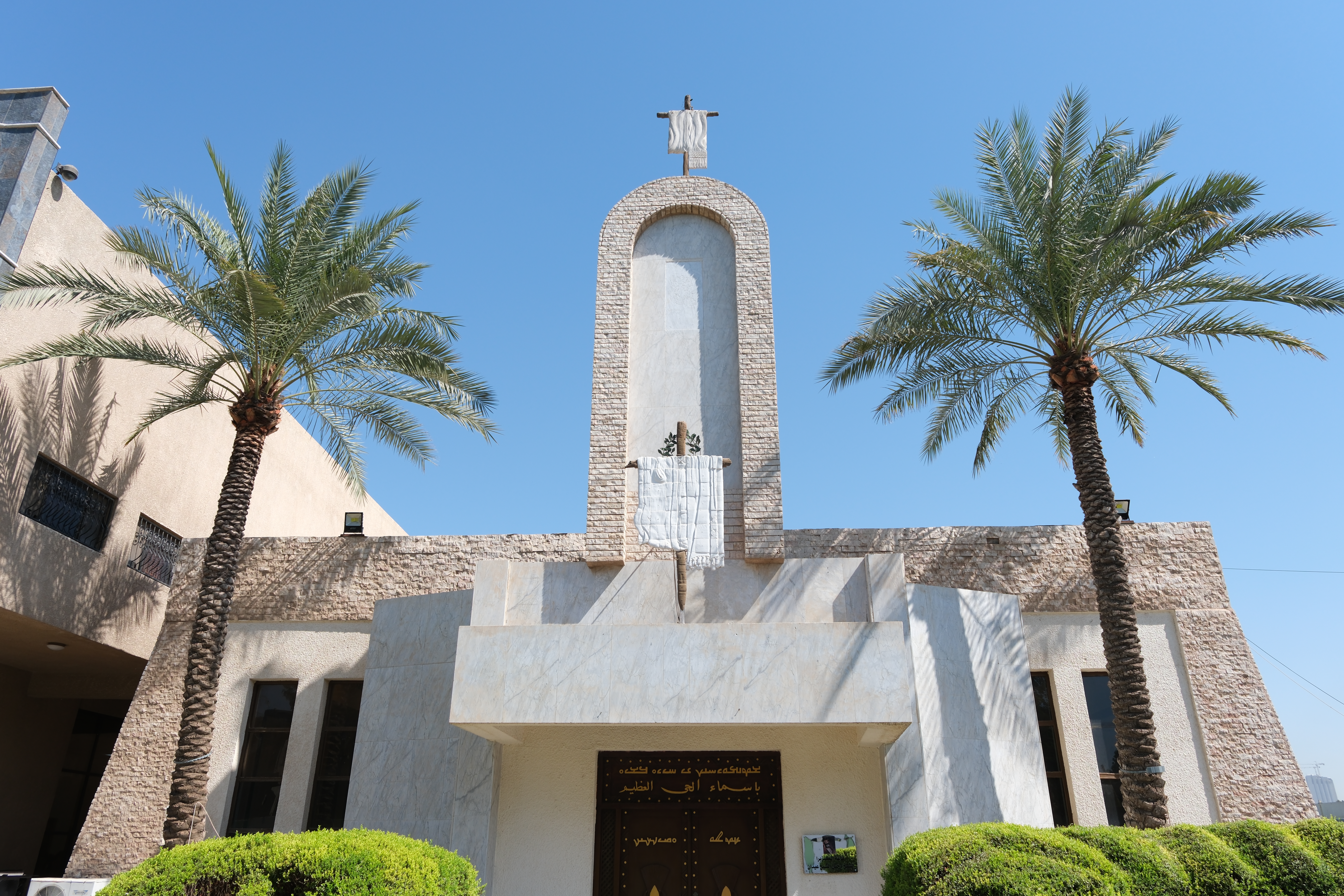
Mandaean Mandi of Baghdad

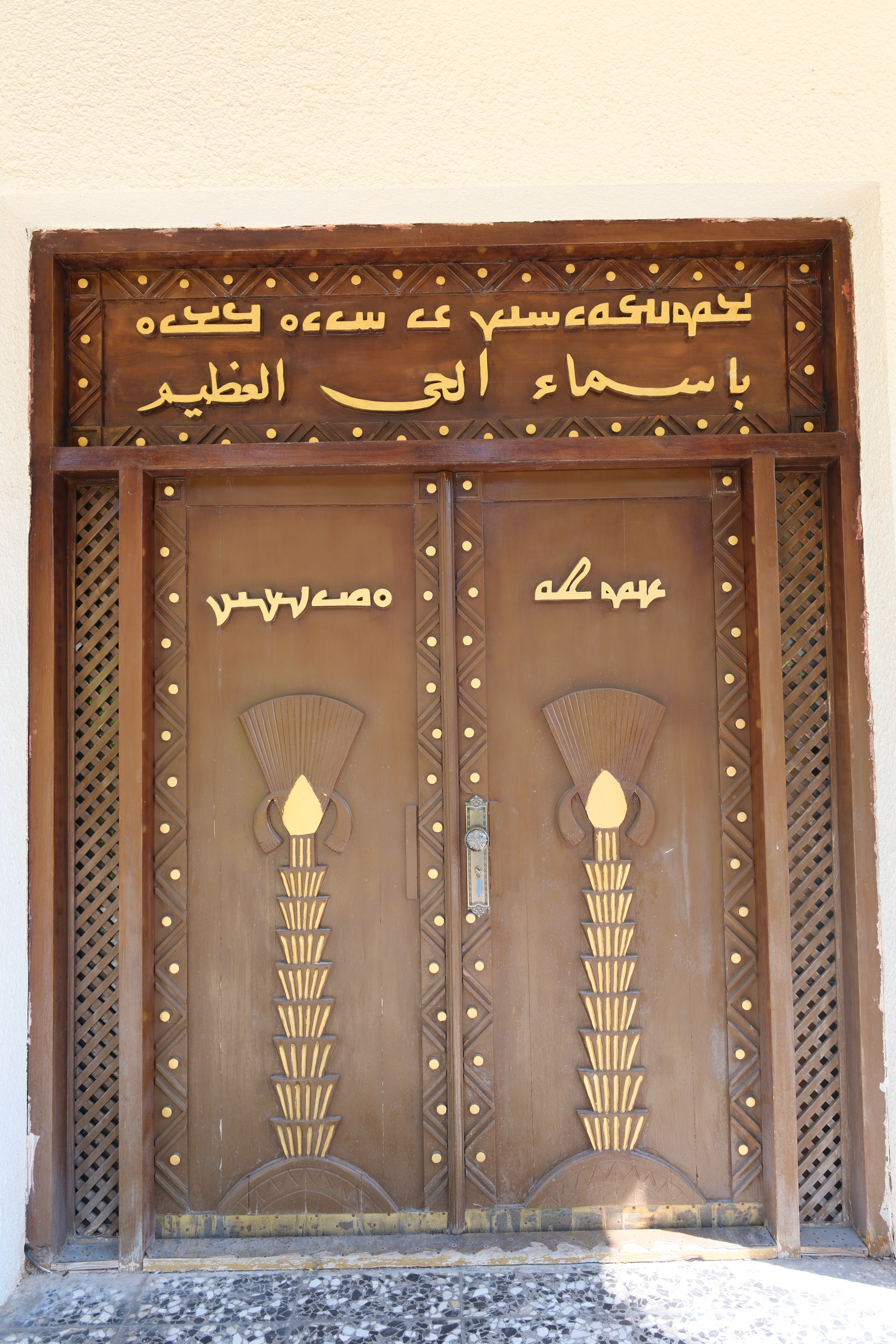
Door entrance to the Mandi, written in Classical Mandaic and Arabic

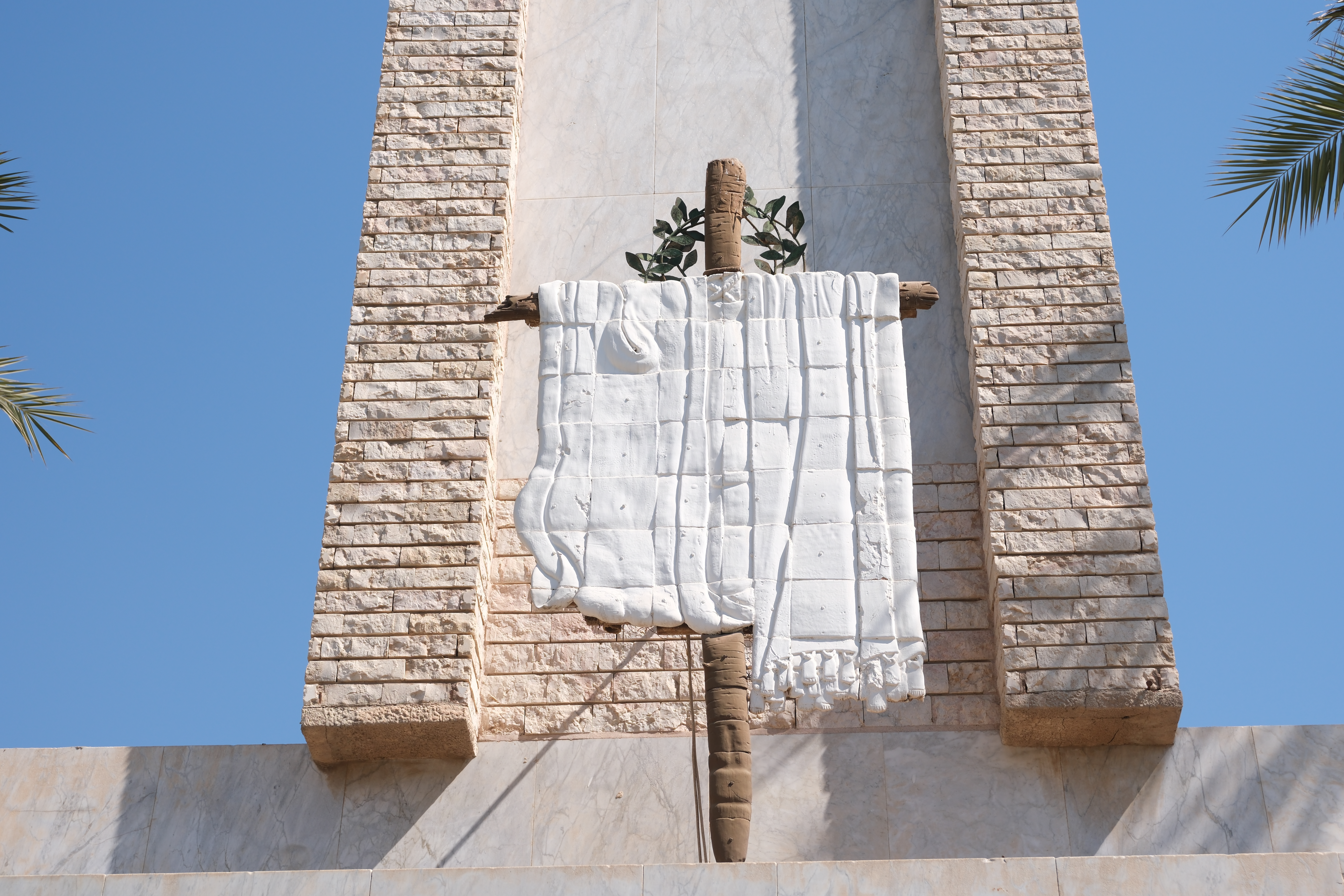
Mandaean Drabsha

== Population ==
=== Iraqi Mandaeans ===
Further information (in Arabic): Mandaeans in Iraq

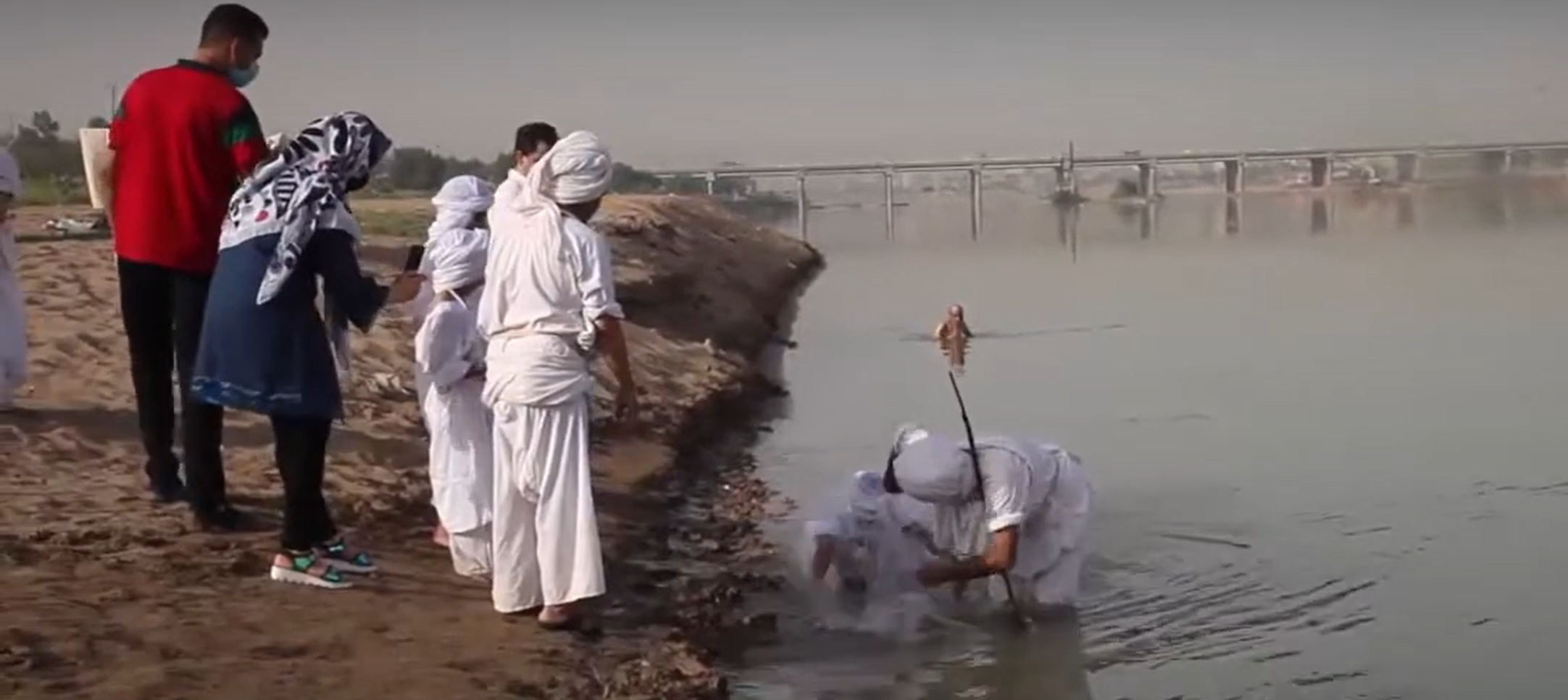
A Mandaean child being baptised (masbuta) in the Karun River, Iran (May 19, 2021)

Prior to the Iraq War, the Iraqi Mandaean community was centered in southern Iraq in cities such as Nasiriyah, Amarah, Qal'at Saleh, Wasit, and Basra, as well as in Baghdad (particularly the district of Dora). Historically, Mandaean quarters had also existed in southern Iraqi towns such as Qurna and Suq al-Shuyukh.

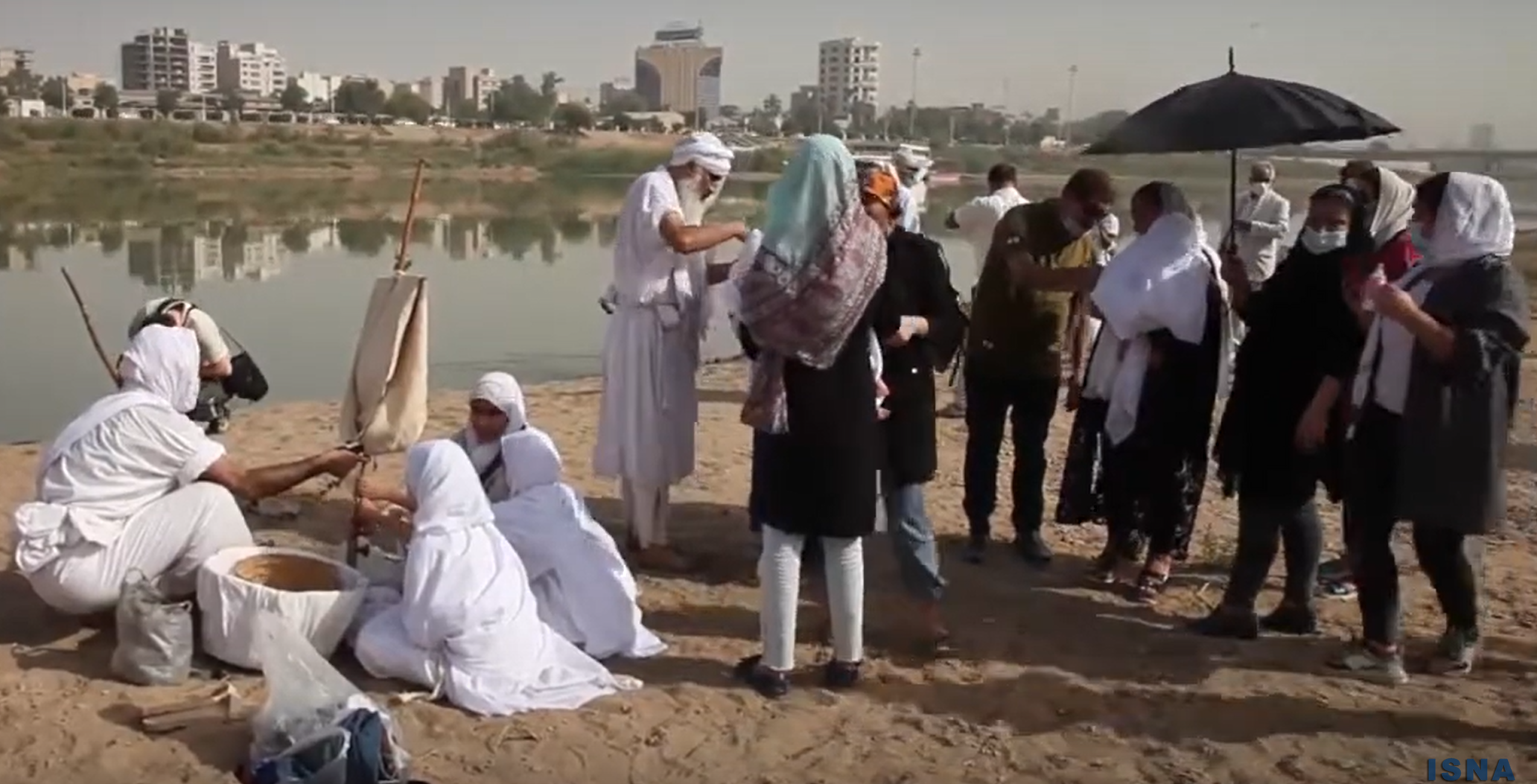
Baptism (masbuta) gathering next to the Karun River, Iran- May 19, 2021

Many also live across the border in Southwestern Iran in the cities of Ahvaz and Khorramshahr. Mandaean emigration from Iraq began during Saddam Hussein's rule, but accelerated greatly after the American-led invasion and subsequent occupation. Since the invasion Mandaeans, like other Iraqi ethno-religious minorities (such as Assyrians, Armenians, Yazidi, Roma and Shabaks), have been subjected to violence, including murders, kidnappings, rapes, evictions, and forced conversions. Mandaeans, like many other Iraqis, have also been targeted for kidnapping since many worked as goldsmiths. Mandaeism is pacifistic and forbids its adherents from carrying weapons. During the 20th century in Iraq, most Mandaeans lived in large towns and cities, although a minority also lived in rural villages in the marshlands of southern Iraq.

Many Iraqi Mandaeans have fled the country in the face of this violence, and the Mandaean community in Iraq faces extinction. Out of the over 60,000 Mandaeans in Iraq in the early 1990s, fewer than 5,000 to 10,000 remain there as of 2007. In early 2007, more than 80% of Iraqi Mandaeans were refugees in Syria and Jordan as a result of the Iraq War. In 2019, an Al-Monitor study estimated the Iraqi Mandaean population to be 3,000, 400 of which lived in the Erbil Governorate, which is 5% or less than the pre-Iraq war Mandaean population.

Mandaeans in the past were renowned silver and gold smiths, blacksmiths and boatbuilders, even before the Abbasid Caliphate when they gained fame as intellectuals in the cultural and scientific fields. In modern Iraq, Mandaeans have gained prominence as academics, writers, artists, poets, physicians, engineers and jewelers.

==== Notable Iraqi Mandaeans ====
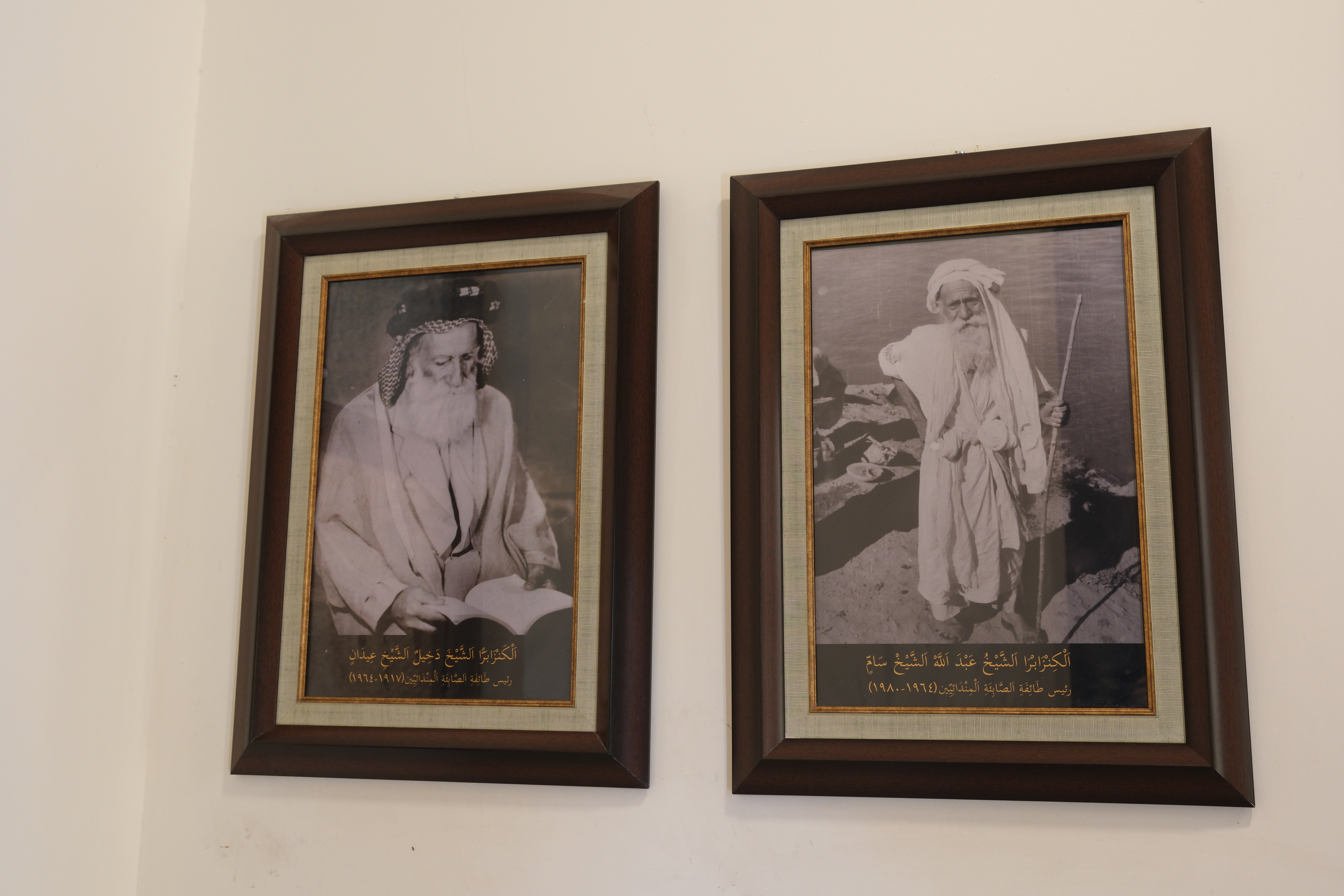
Left to right – Ganzibra Dakheel Edan (1881–1964), Abdullah bar Sam (1890–1981) High Priests of the Mandaeans

- Abdul Jabbar Abdullah (1911–1969), wave theory physicist, dynamical meteorologist, and President Emeritus of the University of Baghdad; MIT graduate (1946); chair of physics at Baghdad University; co-founded the Iraqi Physics and Mathematics Society.
- Abdul Razzak Abdul Wahid (1930–2015), poet.
- Nouman Abid Al-Jader (1916–1991), University of Michigan (Ann Arbor) graduate (1950); acting dean of the College of Science – University of Baghdad; chair of mathematics at the University of Baghdad; co-founded the Iraqi Physics and Mathematics Society.
- Abdul Athem Alsabti (1945–), supernova astrophysicist who introduced astronomy teaching into Iraq in 1970; University of Manchester graduate (1970); minor planet 10478 Alsabti named after him; president of the British Mandaean Council; founded the Iraqi Astronomical Society and Carl Zeiss Planetarium, Baghdad; project leader for the Iraqi National Astronomical Observatory.
- Siham Alsabti (1942–), actress.
- Lamia Abbas Amara (1929–2021), poet and pioneer of modern Arabic poetry. She was the niece of Ganzibra Dakheel Edan.
- Zahroun Amara, world renowned niello silversmith. People that are known to have owned his silver nielloware include Stanley Maude, Winston Churchill, the Bahraini royal family, Egyptian King Farouk, the Iraqi royal family (including kings Faisal I and Ghazi), and the British royal family including the Prince of Wales who became Edward VIII.
- Ganzibra Dakheel Edan (1881–1964), patriarch and international head of the Mandaeans from 1917, until his death in 1964.
- Rishama Abdullah bar Negm (early 1900s–2009), patriarch and head of the Mandaeans in Iraq during the late 1900s.
- Rishama Sattar Jabbar Hilo, current patriarch and head of the Mandaeans in Iraq.
- Najiya Murrani (1919–2011), author, poet.
- Aziz Sbahi, secretary of the Iraqi Communist Party; writer.
- Zaidoon Treeko (1961–), Oud player, composer, and poet.
- Makki Al-Badri (1926–2014), actor.
- Jalal Shaker, footballer.

=== Iranian Mandaeans ===
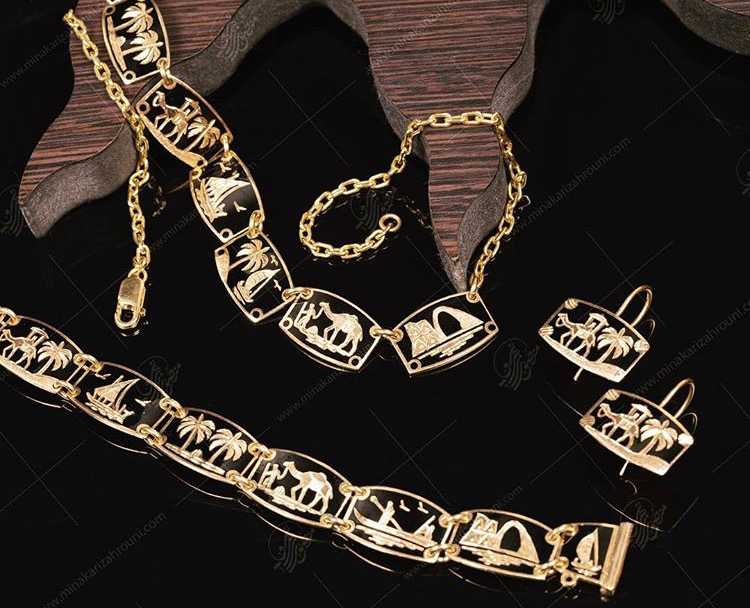
Mīnākārī on gold, an ancient art of Mandaeans, Ahvaz, Iran

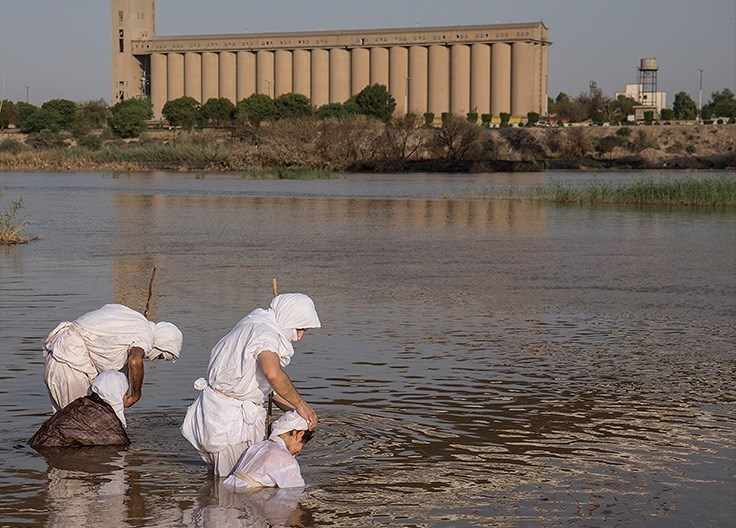
Mandaeans undergoing baptism (masbuta) in the Karun River, Ahvaz, Iran

The number of Iranian Mandaeans is a matter of dispute. In 2009, there were an estimated 5,000 to 10,000 Mandaeans in Iran, according to the Associated Press. Alarabiya has put the number of Iranian Mandaeans as high as 60,000 in 2011.

Until the Iranian Revolution, Mandaeans were mainly concentrated in the Khuzestan Province, where the community used to coexist with the local Arab population. Other than the main cities of Ahvaz and Khorramshahr, Mandaean communities also existed in towns such as Chogha Zanbil in Shush County, Shushtar, and Abadan, as well as Mahshahr, Shadegan, Behbahan, and Susangerd (Khafajiyeh). Mandaean communities had also formerly existed in Dezful, Hamidiyeh, Hoveyzeh, Karun, and Abadan. They were mainly employed as goldsmiths, passing their skills from generation to generation. After the fall of the shah, its members faced increased religious discrimination, and many emigrated to Europe and the Americas.

In Iran, the Gozinesh Law (passed in 1985) has the effect of prohibiting Mandaeans from fully participating in civil life. This law and other gozinesh provisions make access to employment, education, and a range of other areas conditional upon a rigorous ideological screening, the principal prerequisite for which is devotion to the tenets of Islam. These laws are regularly applied to discriminate against religious and ethnic groups that are not officially recognized, such as the Mandaeans, Yarsanis and Baháʼís.

In 2002, the US State Department granted Iranian Mandaeans protective refugee status. Since then, roughly 1,000 have emigrated to the US, now residing in cities such as San Antonio, Texas. On the other hand, the Mandaean community in Iran has increased over the last decade because of the exodus from Iraq of the main Mandaean community, which used to be 50,000–70,000 strong.

==== Notable Iranian Mandaeans ====
- Ganzibra Jabbar Choheili (1923–2014), head of the Mandaean community in Iran until his death in 2014.
- Rishama Salah Choheili, the current patriarch and head of the Mandaean community in Australia

=== Other Middle Eastern Mandaeans ===
Following the Iraq War, the Mandaean community dispersed mostly throughout Jordan, Syria, and Iran. Mandaeans in Jordan number about 2,500 (2018) and in Syria there are about 1,000 remaining (2015).

=== Diaspora ===
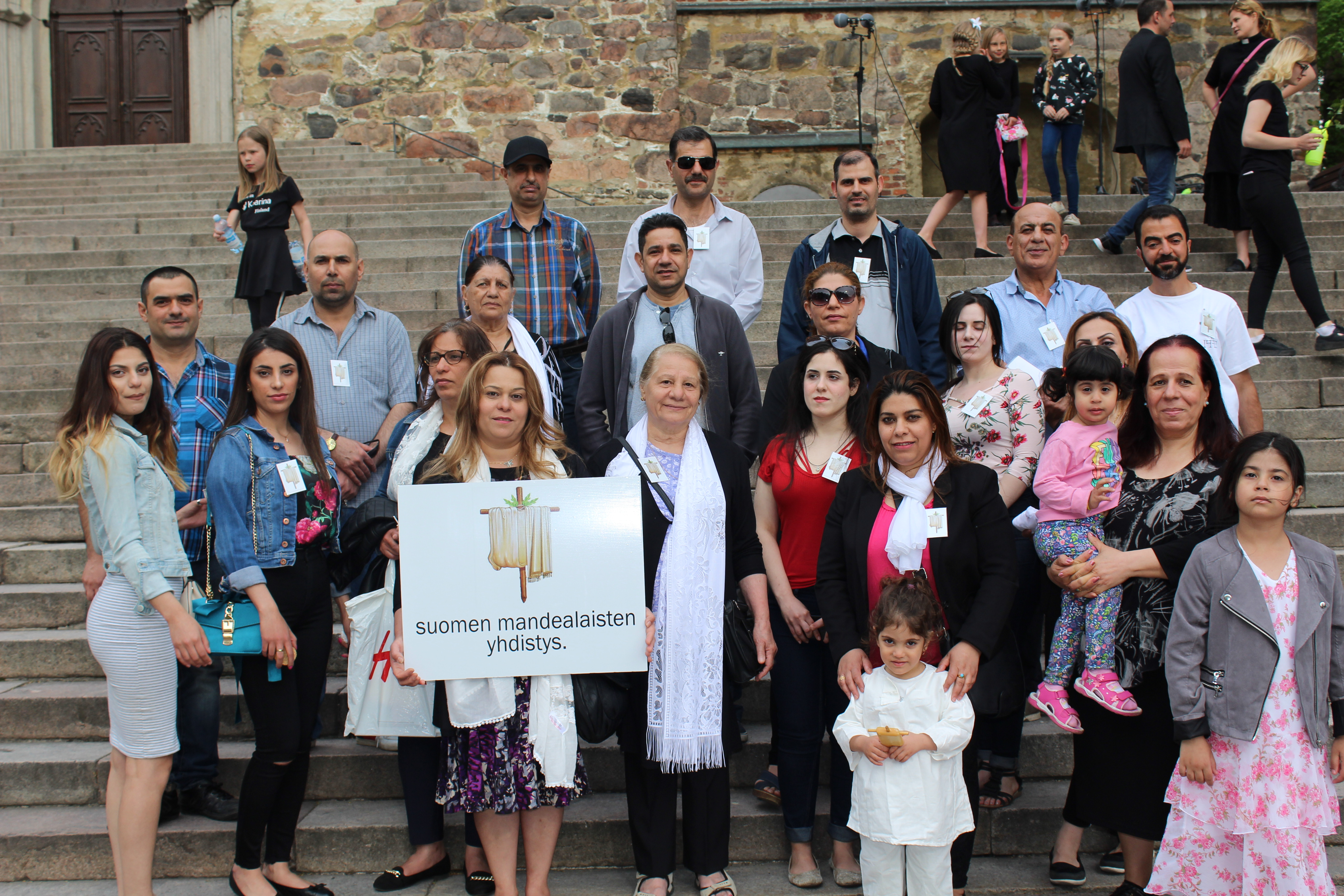
Mandaean community in Finland, May 2018

There are Mandaean diaspora populations in Sweden (c. 10,000–20,000), Australia (c. 10,000), the US (c. 4,000–7,000), the UK (c. 2,500), New Zealand and Canada. There are also Mandaeans living in Germany, the Netherlands (in Nijmegen, The Hague, etc.), Denmark, Finland, France, and smaller communities in Norway and Italy.

==== Australia ====
The Sydney metropolitan area in Australia has one of the largest Mandaean diaspora communities in the world. The community is centered in Greater Western Sydney suburbs such as Penrith and Liverpool. In Liverpool, the main mandi (Beth Manda) is Ganzibra Dakhil Mandi. The Sabian Mandaean Association of Australia has purchased land by the banks of the Nepean River at Wallacia, New South Wales in order to build a new mandi.

==== Sweden ====
Sweden became a popular destination because a Mandaean community existed there before the war and the Swedish government has a liberal asylum policy toward Iraqis. There are between 10,000 and 20,000 Mandaeans in Sweden (2019). The scattered nature of the Mandaean diaspora has raised fears among Mandaeans for the religion's survival. Mandaeism does not allow conversion, and the religious status of Mandaeans who marry outside the faith and their children is disputed.

On September 15, 2018, the Beth Manda Yardna was consecrated in Dalby, Scania, Sweden.

==== United States ====
In the United States, Mandaean communities are centered in San Antonio (c. 2,500), New York City, San Diego, Winnetka, California, Austin, Texas, Worcester, Massachusetts (c. 2,500), Warren, Michigan, Chicago, and other major metropolitan areas. There is a mandi in Detroit.

The status of the Mandaeans has prompted a number of American intellectuals and civil rights activists to call upon the US government to extend refugee status to the community. In 2007, The New York Times ran an op-ed piece in which Swarthmore professor Nathaniel Deutsch called for the Bush administration to take immediate action to preserve the community. Iraqi Mandaeans were given refugee status by the US State Department in 2007. Since then, more than 2500 have entered the US, many settling in Worcester, Massachusetts. The community in Worcester is believed to be the largest in the United States and the second largest community outside the Middle East. About 2,600 Mandaeans from Iran have been settled in Texas since the Iraq War.

== Religion ==
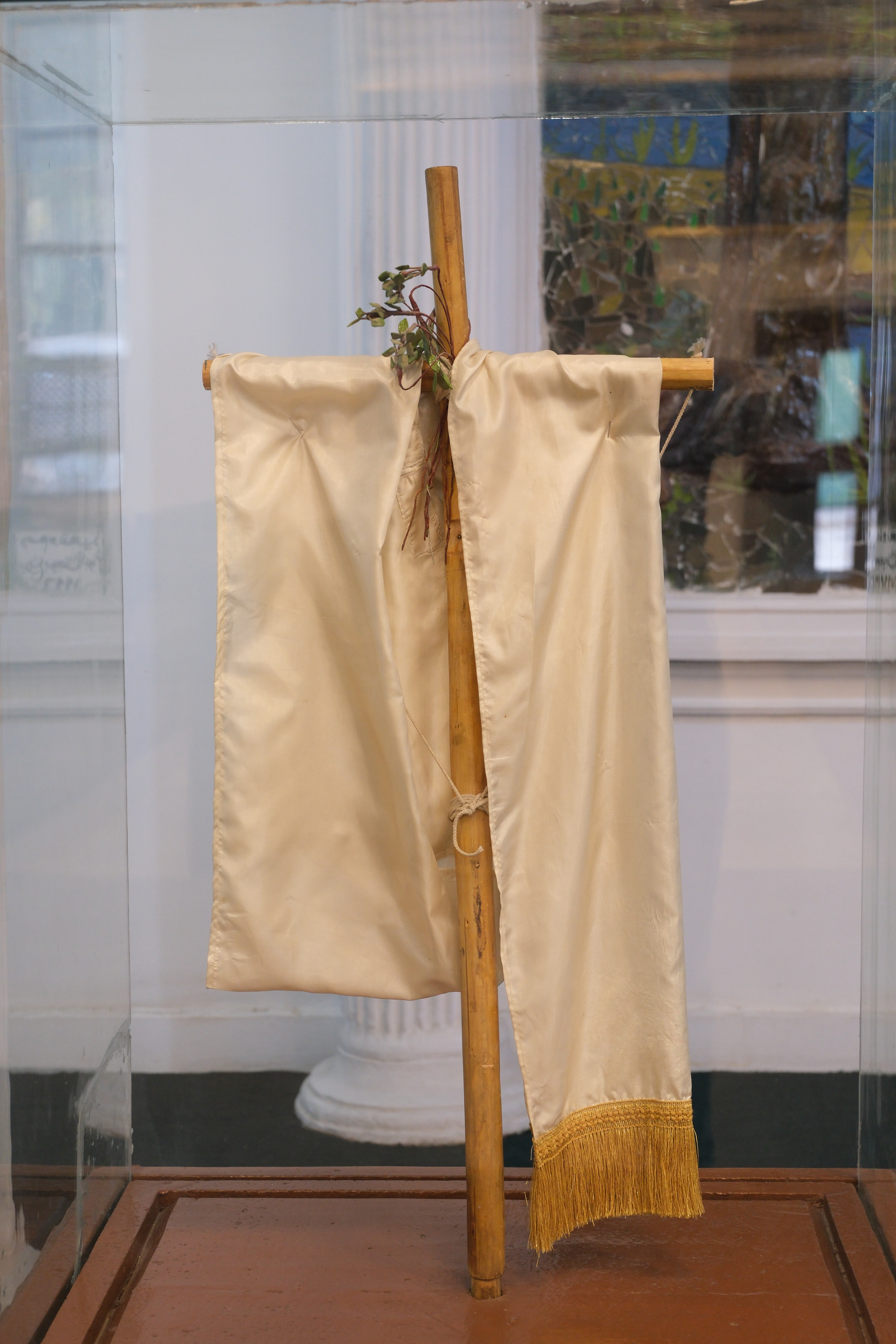
Mandaean Drabsha, symbol of the Mandaean faith

Mandaeans are a closed ethno-religious community, practicing Mandaeism, which is a monotheistic, Gnostic, and ethnic religion (Aramaic manda means "knowledge," and is conceptually related to the Greek term gnosis.) Its adherents revere Adam, Abel, Seth, Enosh, Noah, Shem, Aram, and especially John the Baptist. Mandaeans consider Adam, Seth, Noah, Shem and John the Baptist to be prophets with Adam the founder of the religion and John being the greatest and final prophet.

The Mandaeans group existence into two main categories: light and darkness. They have a dualistic view of life, that encompasses both good and evil; all good is thought to have come from the World of Light (i.e. lightworld) and all evil from the World of Darkness. In relation to the body–mind dualism coined by Descartes, Mandaeans consider the body, and all material, worldly things, to have come from the dark, while the soul (sometimes referred to as the mind) is a product of the lightworld.

Mandaeans believe that there is a constant battle or conflict between the forces of good and evil. The forces of good are represented by Nhura (Light) and Maia Hayyi (Living Water) and those of evil are represented by Hshuka (darkness) and Maia Tahmi (dead or rancid water). The two waters are mixed in all things in order to achieve a balance. Mandaeans also believe in an afterlife or heaven called Alma d-Nhura (World of Light).

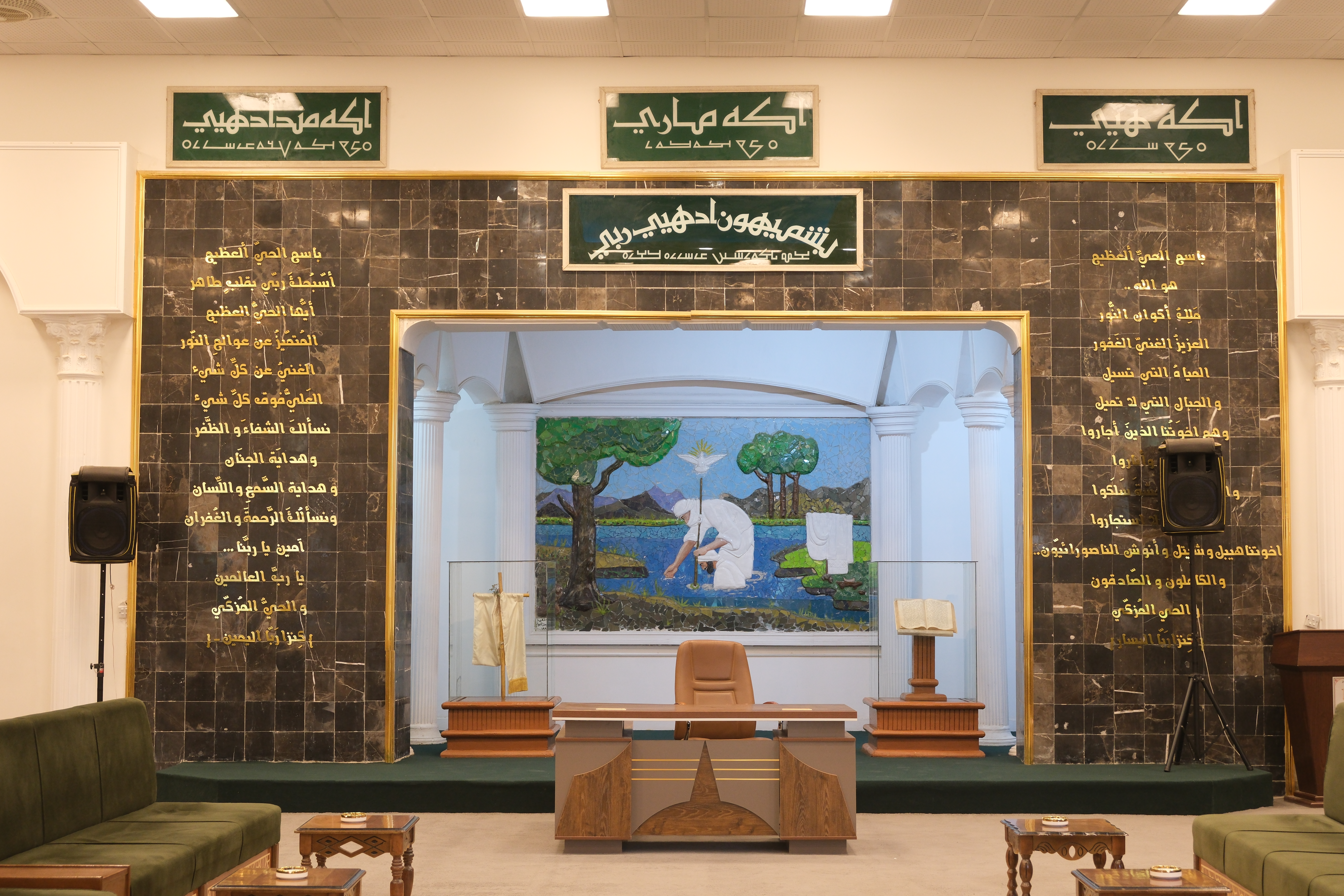
Inside Mandaean Mandi of Baghdad

In Mandaeism, the World of Light is ruled by a Supreme God, known as Hayyi Rabbi ('The Great Life' or 'The Great Living God'). Other names used are Mare d'Rabuta ('Lord of Greatness'), Mana Rabba ('The Great Mind'), Melka d'Nhura ('King of Light') and Hayyi Qadmaiyi ('The First Life'). God is so great, vast, and incomprehensible that no words can fully depict how awesome God is. It is believed that an innumerable number of uthras (angels or guardians), manifested from the light, surround and perform acts of worship to praise and honor God. They inhabit worlds separate from the lightworld and some are commonly referred to as emanations and are subservient beings to 'The First Life'; their names include Second, Third, and Fourth Life (i.e. Yōšamin, Abathur, and Ptahil).

Saint John the Baptist by Leonardo da Vinci

The Lord of Darkness (Krun) is the ruler of the World of Darkness formed from dark waters representing chaos. A main defender of the darkworld is a giant monster, or dragon, with the name Ur, and an evil, female ruler also inhabits the darkworld, known as Ruha. The Mandaeans believe these malevolent rulers created demonic offspring who consider themselves the owners of the seven planets and twelve zodiac constellations.

According to Mandaean beliefs, the material world is a mixture of light and dark created by Ptahil, who fills the role of the demiurge, with help from dark powers, such as Ruha, the Seven, and the Twelve. Adam's body (believed to be the first human created by God in Abrahamic tradition) was fashioned by these dark beings, however his soul (or mind) was a direct creation from the Light. Therefore, many Mandaeans believe the human soul is capable of salvation because it originates from the lightworld. The soul, sometimes referred to as the 'inner Adam' or Adam kasia, is in dire need of being rescued from the dark, so it may ascend into the heavenly realm of the lightworld. Baptisms are a central theme in Mandaeism, believed to be necessary for the redemption of the soul. Mandaeans do not perform a single baptism, as in religions such as Christianity; rather, they view baptisms as a ritual act capable of bringing the soul closer to salvation. Therefore, Mandaeans are baptized repeatedly during their lives. John the Baptist is a key figure for the Mandaeans; they consider him to have been a Nasoraean Mandaean. John is referred to as their greatest and final teacher.

== Scholarship ==
According to Edmondo Lupieri, as stated in his article in Encyclopædia Iranica,

The possible historical connection with John the Baptist, as seen in the newly translated Mandaean texts, convinced many (notably R. Bultmann) that it was possible, through the Mandaean traditions, to shed some new light on the history of John and on the origins of Christianity. This brought around a revival of the otherwise almost fully abandoned idea of their Palestinian origins. As the archeological discovery of Mandaean incantation bowls and lead amulets proved a pre-Islamic Mandaean presence in the southern Mesopotamia, scholars were obliged to hypothesize otherwise unknown persecutions by Jews or by Christians to explain the reason for Mandaeans' departure from Palestine.

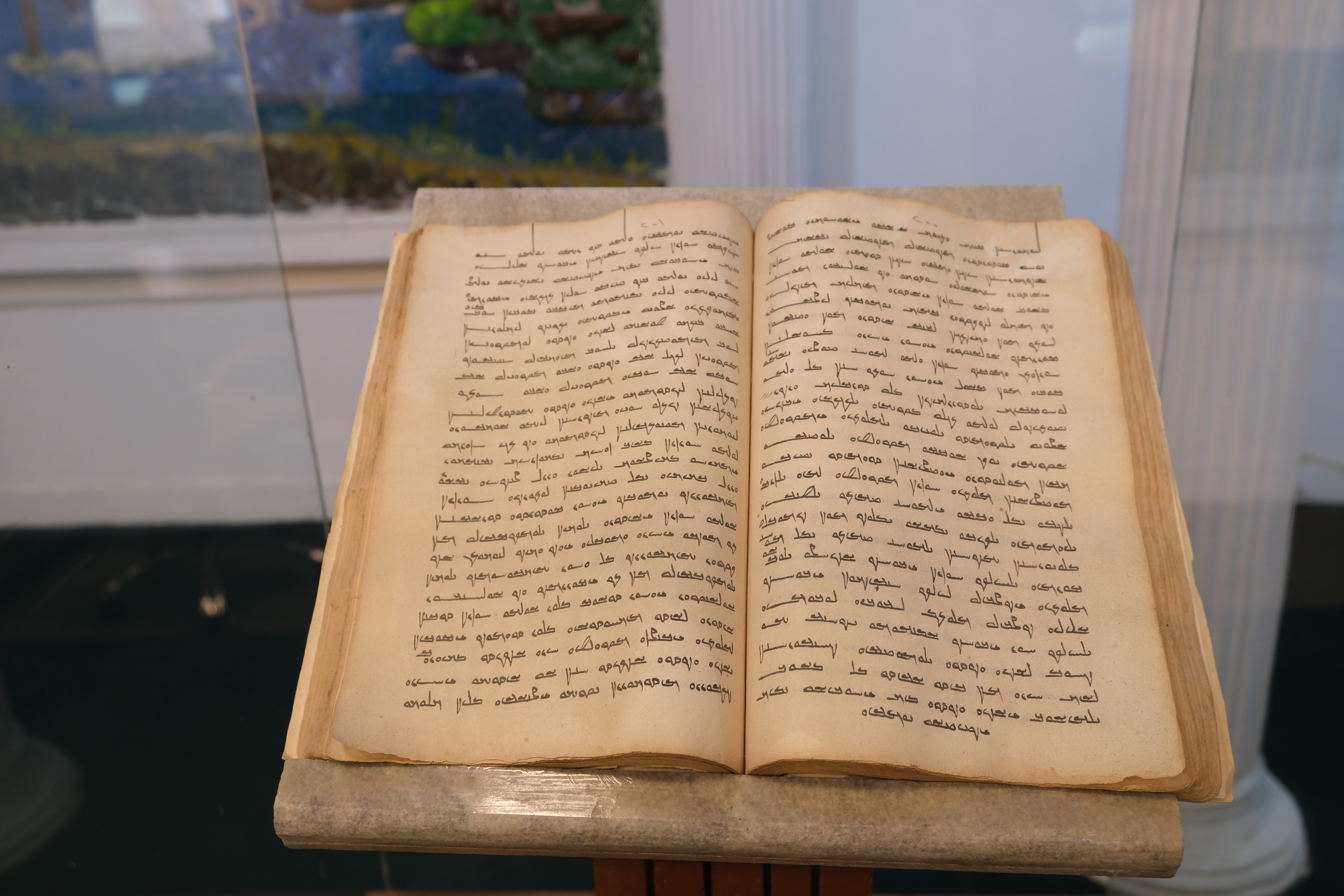
Mandaean Book of John

Lupieri believes Mandaeism is a post-Christian southern Mesopotamian Gnostic off-shoot and claims that Zazai d-Gawazta to be the founder of Mandaeism in the 2nd century. Jorunn J. Buckley refutes this by confirming scribes that predate Zazai who copied the Ginza Rabba. In addition to Edmondo Lupieri, Christa Müller-Kessler argues against the Palestinian origin theory of the Mandaeans claiming that the Mandaeans are Mesopotamian. Edwin Yamauchi believes Mandaeism's origin lies in the Transjordan where a group of 'non-Jews' migrated to Mesopotamia and combined their Gnostic beliefs with indigenous Mesopotamian beliefs at the end of the 2nd century CE. Kevin van Bladel claims that Mandaeism originated no earlier than 5th century Sassanid Mesopotamia, a thesis which has been criticized by James F. McGrath. Al-Zuhairy (1998) believes that the roots of Mandaeism lies in Mesopotamia, inherited from the Sumerians, and the present form of Mandaeism likely emerged in Mesopotamia in the 3rd century BCE.

The Mandaean author Aziz Sbahi in his book, The Origins of Sabians and their Religious Beliefs, traced the Mandaeans to the Babylonian Era. Sbahi, who is known more as a secretary of the Iraqi Communist Party, acknowledges that Mandaeism may have been affected by religions in Mesopotamia and the Dead Sea region. Sbahi believes that Mandaeism originated in surroundings that had Hellenic, Babylonian, Gnostic and Judaic influence. However, due to Sbahi's lack of knowledge of the Mandaic language, he read only secondary sources on the Mandaeans. Brikha Nasoraia, a Mandaean priest and scholar, believes in a two-origin theory in which he considers the contemporary Mandaeans to have descended from both proto-Mandaeans originating in the Jordan valley as well as another group of Mandaeans (or Gnostics) indigenous to southern Mesopotamia.

Scholars specializing in Mandaeism such as Kurt Rudolph, Mark Lidzbarski, Rudolf Macúch, Ethel S. Drower, Eric Segelberg, James F. McGrath, Charles G. Häberl, Jorunn Jacobsen Buckley, and Şinasi Gündüz argue for an Israelite origin. The majority of these scholars believe that the Mandaeans likely have a historical connection with John the Baptist's inner circle of disciples. Charles Häberl, who is also a linguist specializing in Mandaic, finds Jewish Aramaic, Samaritan Aramaic, Hebrew, Greek and Latin influence on Mandaic and accepts Mandaeans having a "shared Israelite history with Jews". In addition, scholars such as Richard August Reitzenstein, Rudolf Bultmann, G. R. S. Mead, Samuel Zinner, Richard Thomas, J. C. Reeves, Gilles Quispel, and K. Beyer also argue for a Judea/Palestine or Jordan Valley origin for the Mandaeans. James McGrath and Richard Thomas believe there is a direct connection between Mandaeism and pre-exilic traditional Israelite religion. Lady Ethel S. Drower "sees early Christianity as a Mandaean heresy" and adds "heterodox Judaism in Galilee and Samaria appears to have taken shape in the form we now call gnostic, and it may well have existed some time before the Christian era." This claim from E. S. Drower has been refuted by the scholar Edwin Yamauchi who said "In the earlier period of interest, exaggerated claims for the bearing of the Mandaeans on the New Testament and on Christianity were made."Barbara Thiering questions the dating of the Dead Sea Scrolls and suggests that the Teacher of Righteousness (leader of the Essenes) was John the Baptist. Jorunn J. Buckley accepts Mandaeism's Israelite or Judean origins and adds:

[T]he Mandaeans may well have become the inventors of – or at least contributors to the development of – Gnosticism ... and they produced the most voluminous Gnostic literature we know, in one language... influenc[ing] the development of Gnostic and other religious groups in late antiquity [e.g. Manichaeism, Valentianism].

== Other names ==
=== Sabians ===
During the 9th and 10th centuries several religious groups came to be identified with the mysterious Sabians (sometimes also spelled 'Sabaeans' or 'Sabeans', but not to be confused with the Sabaeans of South Arabia) mentioned in the Quran alongside the Jews, the Christians, and the Zoroastrians as a 'people of the book' (ahl al-kitāb). These religious groups, which included the Mandaeans but also various pagan groups in Harran (Upper Mesopotamia) and the marshlands of southern Iraq, claimed the name in order to be recognized by the Muslim authorities as a people of the book deserving of legal protection (dhimma). The earliest source to unambiguously apply the term 'Sabian' to the Mandaeans was al-Hasan ibn Bahlul (fl. 950–1000) citing the Abbasid vizier Abu Ali Muhammad ibn Muqla (c. 885–940). However, it is not clear whether the Mandaeans of this period already identified themselves as Sabians or whether the claim originated with Ibn Muqla.

Some modern scholars have identified the Sabians mentioned in the Quran as Mandaeans, although many other possible identifications have been proposed. Some scholars believe it is impossible to establish their original identity with any degree of certainty. Mandaeans continue to be called Sabians to this day.

=== Nasoraeans ===
The Haran Gawaita uses the name Nasoraeans for the Mandaeans arriving from Jerusalem meaning guardians or possessors of secret rites and knowledge. Scholars such as Kurt Rudolph, Rudolf Macúch, Mark Lidzbarski and Ethel S. Drower connect the Mandaeans with the Nasaraeans described by Epiphanius, a group within the Essenes according to Joseph Lightfoot. Epiphanius says (29:6) that they existed before Christ. That is questioned by some, but others accept the pre-Christian origin of the Nasaraeans.

The Nasaraeans ‐ they were Jews by nationality ‐ originally from Gileaditis, Bashanitis and the Transjordan ... They acknowledged Moses and believed that he had received laws ‐ not this law, however, but some other. And so, they were Jews who kept all the Jewish observances, but they would not offer sacrifice or eat meat. They considered it unlawful to eat meat or make sacrifices with it. They claim that these Books are fictions, and that none of these customs were instituted by the fathers. This was the difference between the Nasaraeans and the others.

— Epiphanius' Panarion 1:18

== Language ==
Neo-Mandaic is the contemporary language spoken by some Mandaeans, while Classical Mandaic is the liturgical language of Mandaeism. However, most Mandaeans currently do not speak conversational Neo-Mandaic in everyday life, but rather the languages of their host countries, such as Arabic, Farsi, or English.

== Genetics ==
According to the Iranian Journal of Public Health:

About 20 centuries ago, Mandaeans migrated from Jordan/Palestine areas to Iraq and Iran. Therefore, their gene pool was separated from their origins for about 20 centuries. During this period, evolutionary forces might have some effects on the Mandaeans' gene pool. The frequency of the GSTM1 null genotype among Jordanian, Palestinian, Ashkenazi Jews and non-Ashkenazi Jews was 27.1%, 56.0%, 55.2%, and 55.2% (9, 10), respectively. On the other hand, the frequency of the GSTT1 null genotype among Jordanian, Palestinian, Ashkenazi Jews and non-Ashkenazi Jews was 24.2%, 22.0%, 26.0%, 22.1% (9, 10), respectively. Comparisons between Iranian Mandaeans and above-mentioned populations demonstrating that Mandaeans showed higher and lower levels of the GSTM1 and GSTT1 null genotypes, respectively. There was [a] remarkable difference between Mandaeans and other mentioned populations for the frequency of the GSTM1 null genotype. Mutation, gene flow and natural selection should be disregarded in [the] interpretation [of] the influence of evolutionary forces on Mandaeans and their surrounding gene pools. In Iran and Iraq Mandaeans lived as small and isolated ethno-religious communities. Therefore, genetic drift, at least in part might account for differences between Mandaeans and other populations.

== See also ==
- Assyrians
- Babylonian Jews
- Marsh Arabs
- Persian Jews
- Samaritans
- Yazidis

Related historical groups

- Bana'im
- Dositheans
- Elcesaites
- Ebionites
- Essenes
- Gnostics
- Hemerobaptists
- Maghāriya
- Nazarene (sect)
- Quqites
- Sethians
- Valentinians

Other topics

- Mandaean name
- Mandaean studies
- Outline of Mandaeism

== Bibliography ==
=== Primary sources ===
- Buckley, Jorunn J. (1993). The Scroll of Exalted Kingship: Diwan Malkuta 'Laita (Mandean Manuscript No. 34 in the Drower Collection, Bodleian Library, Oxford). New Haven: American Oriental Society.
- Drowe r, E. S. (1950a). Diwan Abatur, or Progress Through the Purgatories: Text with Translation Notes and Appendices. Città del Vaticano: Biblioteca Apostolica Vaticana.
- Drower, E.S. (1950b). Šarḥ ḏ Qabin ḏ šišlam Rba (D. C. 38). Explanatory Commentary on the Marriage-Ceremony of the great Šišlam. Roma: Pontificio Istituto Biblico.
- Drower, E.S. (1960a). The Thousand and Twelve Questions (Alf trisar šuialia). Berlin: Akademie-Verlag.
- Drower, E.S. (1962). The Coronation of the Great Šišlam, Being a Description of the Rite of the Coronation of a Mandaean Priest according to the Ancient Canon. Leiden: Brill.
- Drower, E.S. (1963). A Pair of Naṣoraean Commentaries (Two Priestly Documents): The Great First World and The Lesser First World. Leiden: Brill.
- Häberl, Charles G. (2022). The Book of Kings and the Explanations of This World: A Universal History from the Late Sasanian Empire. Translated Texts for Historians. Vol. 80. Liverpool: Liverpool University Press. ISBN 978-1-800-85627-1.
- Häberl, Charles G.; McGrath, James F., eds. (2019). The Mandaean Book of John. Critical Edition, Translation, and Commentary. Berlin and Boston: De Gruyter. doi:10.1515/9783110487862. ISBN 978-3-11-048786-2. S2CID 226656912.
- Häberl, Charles G.; McGrath, James F. (2020). Häberl, Charles G.; McGrath, James F. (eds.). The Mandaean Book of John: Text and Translation. Berlin: De Gruyter. doi:10.1515/9783110487862. ISBN 978-3-11-048786-2. S2CID 226656912. (open access version of text and translation, taken from Häberl & McGrath 2019)

=== Secondary sources ===
- Buckley, Jorunn J. (2002). The Mandaeans: Ancient Texts and Modern People. New York: Oxford University Press.
- Buckley, Jorunn J. (2005). The Great Stem of Souls: Reconstruction Mandaean History. Piscataway: Gorgias Press.
- Chwolsohn, Daniel (1856). Die Ssabier und die Ssabismus [The Sabians and the Sabianism]. Vols. 1–2. (in German). St. Petersburg: Kaiserlichen Akademie der Wissenschaften. OCLC 64850836.
- De Blois, François (1995). "The "Sabians" (Ṣābi'ūn) in pre-Islamic Arabia". Acta Orientalia. 56: 39–61.
- De Blois, F.C. (1960–2007). "Ṣābiʾ". In Bearman, P.; Bianquis, Th.; Bosworth, C.E.; van Donzel, E.; Heinrichs, W.P. (eds.). Encyclopaedia of Islam, Second Edition. doi:10.1163/1573-3912_islam_COM_0952.
- De Blois, François (2004). "Sabians". In McAuliffe, Jane Dammen (ed.). Encyclopaedia of the Qurʾān. doi:10.1163/1875-3922_q3_EQSIM_00362.
- Deutsch, Nathaniel (1999). Guardians of the Gate: Angelic Vice-regency in the Late Antiquity. Brill. ISBN 978-90-04-67924-5.
- Drower, Ethel Stephana (1937). The Mandaeans of Iraq and Iran: Their Cults, Customs, Magic Legends, and Folklore. Oxford: Clarendon Press. (reprint: Piscataway: Gorgias Press, 2002)
- Drower, Ethel Stephana (1960b). The Secret Adam: A Study of Nasoraean Gnosis. Oxford: Clarendon Press. OCLC 654318531.
- Fahd, Toufic (1960–2007). "Ṣābiʾa". In Bearman, P.; Bianquis, Th.; Bosworth, C.E.; van Donzel, E.; Heinrichs, W.P. (eds.). Encyclopaedia of Islam, Second Edition. doi:10.1163/1573-3912_islam_COM_0953.
- Genequand, Charles (1999). "Idolâtrie, astrolâtrie, et sabéisme". Studia Islamica. 89 (89): 109–128. doi:10.2307/1596088. JSTOR 1596088.
- Green, Tamara M. (1992). The City of the Moon God: Religious Traditions of Harran. Religions in the Graeco-Roman World. Vol. 114. Leiden: Brill. ISBN 978-90-04-09513-7.
- Gündüz, Şinasi [in Turkish] (1994). The Knowledge of Life: The Origins and Early History of the Mandaeans and Their Relation to the Sabians of the Qur'ān and to the Harranians. Journal of Semitic Studies Supplement. Vol. 3. Oxford: Oxford University Press. ISBN 978-0-19-922193-6.
- Hämeen-Anttila, Jaakko (2006). The Last Pagans of Iraq: Ibn Waḥshiyya and His Nabatean Agriculture. Leiden: Brill. ISBN 978-90-04-15010-2.
- Lupieri, Edmondo (2002). The Mandaeans: The Last Gnostics. Grand Rapids: Eerdmans.
- Lightfoot, Joseph Barber (1875). "On Some Points Connected with the Essenes". St. Paul's epistles to the Colossians and to Philemon: a revised text with introductions, notes, and dissertations. London: Macmillan Publishers. OCLC 6150927.
- Macuch, Rudolf; Drower, E. S. (1963). A Mandaic Dictionary. Oxford: Clarendon Press.
- Margoliouth, D.S. (1913). "Harranians". In Hastings, James; Selbie, John A. (eds.). Encyclopaedia of Religion and Ethics. Vol. VI. Edinburgh: T. & T. Clark. pp. 519–520. OCLC 4993011.
- Nasoraia, Brikhah H. S. (2012). "Sacred Text and Esoteric Praxis in Sabian Mandaean Religion". In Çetinkaya, Bayram (ed.). Religious and Philosophical Texts: Rereading, Understanding and Comprehending Them in the 21st Century. Vol. I. Istanbul: Sultanbeyli Belediyesi. pp. 27–53.
- Rashed, Marwan (2009a). "Thabit ibn Qurra sur l'existence et l'infini: les réponses aux questions posées par Ibn Usayyid". In Rashed, Roshdi (ed.). Thābit ibn Qurra: Science and Philosophy in Ninth-Century Baghdad. Scientia Graeco-Arabica. Berlin: De Gruyter. pp. 619–673. doi:10.1515/9783110220797.6.619. ISBN 978-3-11-022078-0.
- Rashed, Roshdi (2009b). "Thābit ibn Qurra: From Ḥarrān to Baghdad". In Rashed, Roshdi (ed.). Thābit ibn Qurra: Science and Philosophy in Ninth-Century Baghdad. Scientia Graeco-Arabica. Berlin: De Gruyter. pp. 15–24. doi:10.1515/9783110220797.1.15. ISBN 978-3-11-022078-0.
- Roberts, Alexandre M. (2017). "Being a Sabian at Court in Tenth-Century Baghdad". Journal of the American Oriental Society. 137 (2): 253–277. doi:10.17613/M6GB8Z.
- Rudolph, Kurt (April 1964). "War Der Verfasser Der Oden Salomos Ein "Qumran-Christ"? Ein Beitrag zur Diskussion um die Anfänge der Gnosis" [Was the author of the Odes of Solomon a "Qumran Christian"? A contribution to the discussion about the beginnings of Gnosis]. Revue de Qumrân (in German). 4 (16). Peeters: 523–555.
- Rudolph, Kurt (1977). "Mandaeism". In Moore, Albert C. (ed.). Iconography of Religions: An Introduction. Vol. 21. Chris Robertson. ISBN 978-0-8006-0488-2.
- Rudolph, Kurt (2001). Gnosis: The Nature and History of Gnosticism. A&C Black. pp. 343–366. ISBN 978-0-567-08640-2.
- Segelberg, Eric (1969). "Old and New Testament figures in Mandaean version". Scripta Instituti Donneriani Aboensis. 3: 228–239. doi:10.30674/scripta.67040.
- Stroumsa, Sarah (2004). "Sabéens de Ḥarrān et Sabéens de Maïmonide". In Lévy, Tony; Rashed, Roshdi (eds.). Maïmonide: Philosophe et savant (1138–1204). Leuven: Peeters. pp. 335–352. ISBN 978-90-429-1458-2.
- Thomas, Richard (January 29, 2016). "The Israelite Origins of the Mandaean People". Studia Antiqua. 5 (2).
- Van Bladel, Kevin (2009). "Hermes and the Ṣābians of Ḥarrān". The Arabic Hermes: From Pagan Sage to Prophet of Science. Oxford: Oxford University Press. pp. 64–118. doi:10.1093/acprof:oso/9780195376135.003.0003. ISBN 978-0-19-537613-5.
- Van Bladel, Kevin (2017). From Sasanian Mandaeans to Ṣābians of the Marshes. Leiden: Brill. doi:10.1163/9789004339460. ISBN 978-90-04-33943-9.
  - Review: McGrath, James F. (2019). "James F. McGrath Reviews From Sasanian Mandaeans to Sabians (van Bladel)". Enoch Seminar Online.
- Yamauchi, Edwin M. (2005) [1967]. Mandaic Incantation Texts. Piscataway: Gorgias Press.
- Yamauchi, Edwin M. (2004) [1970]. Gnostic Ethics and Mandaean Origins. Piscataway: Gorgias Press.
