= Sabian–Mandaean Mandi of Baghdad =

Mandaean temple in Baghdad, Iraq

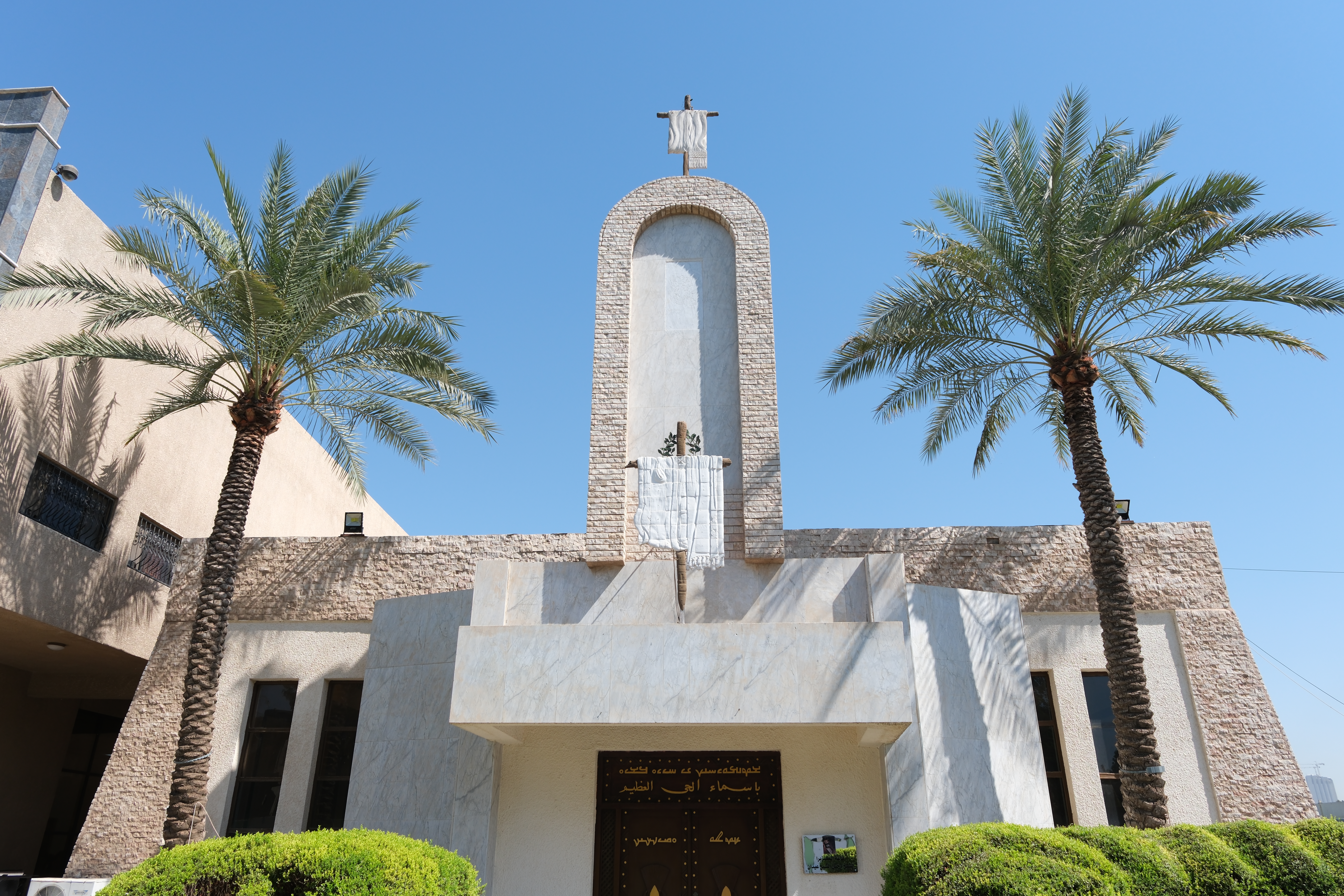
- Overview of the mandi, which was rebuilt in 2024

Religion
- Affiliation: Mandaeism
- Leadership: Rishama Sattar Jabbar Hilow

Location
- Location: Al-Qadisiyah
- Municipality: Baghdad
- Country: Iraq
- Interactive map of Sabian–Mandaean Mandi of Baghdad
- Administration: Religious Endowments Office
- Coordinates: 33°16′54″N 44°21′31″E

The Sabian–Mandaean Mandi of Baghdad (Arabic: مندي الصابئة المندائية, romanized: Mandi Al-Sabi'at Al-Manda'iyah) is a Mandaean temple in Baghdad, Iraq. It is located on the banks of the Tigris River in the Al-Qadisiyah neighborhood. Rishama Sattar Jabbar Hilow is the official head of the Mandi. The Mandi serves as the main administrative center for the Iraqi Mandaeans.

In the early 1980s, the Mandi was built on land originally owned by the Iraqi Ministry of Finance that was allocated to the Mandaean community, with an area of approximately 1,200 square metres. It has ritual halls and a guesthouse to receive and accommodate visitors.

== History ==
Since the old Mandi was no longer sufficient for the community's needs, in addition to excessive maintenance costs, the Mandaean community decided, with the approval of the Three Religious Endowments Office, to demolish it and rebuild it according to modern designs, with an architectural character that preserves the former Mandi's religious style.

During an event in 2019, the Mandaean leadership in coordination with the Kirkuk Affairs Council decided to buy a residential apartment. With this, many philanthropists began to provide donations amounting to 25 million dinars. The initial amount, about 4 million dinars, was collected from some of the benefactors from Baghdad and Basra, and it was kept by Mandi Kirkuk until the full amount was reached.

The donations were collected by a committee of the Sectional Affairs Council in Baghdad and the Spiritual Council.

== Facilities ==
The Mandi contains gathering halls and a guesthouse to receive and accommodate guests. It was used as a shelter for some Mandaeans displaced from other cities. In the Mandaic language, the word Mandi means knowledge or science.

=== Gallery ===
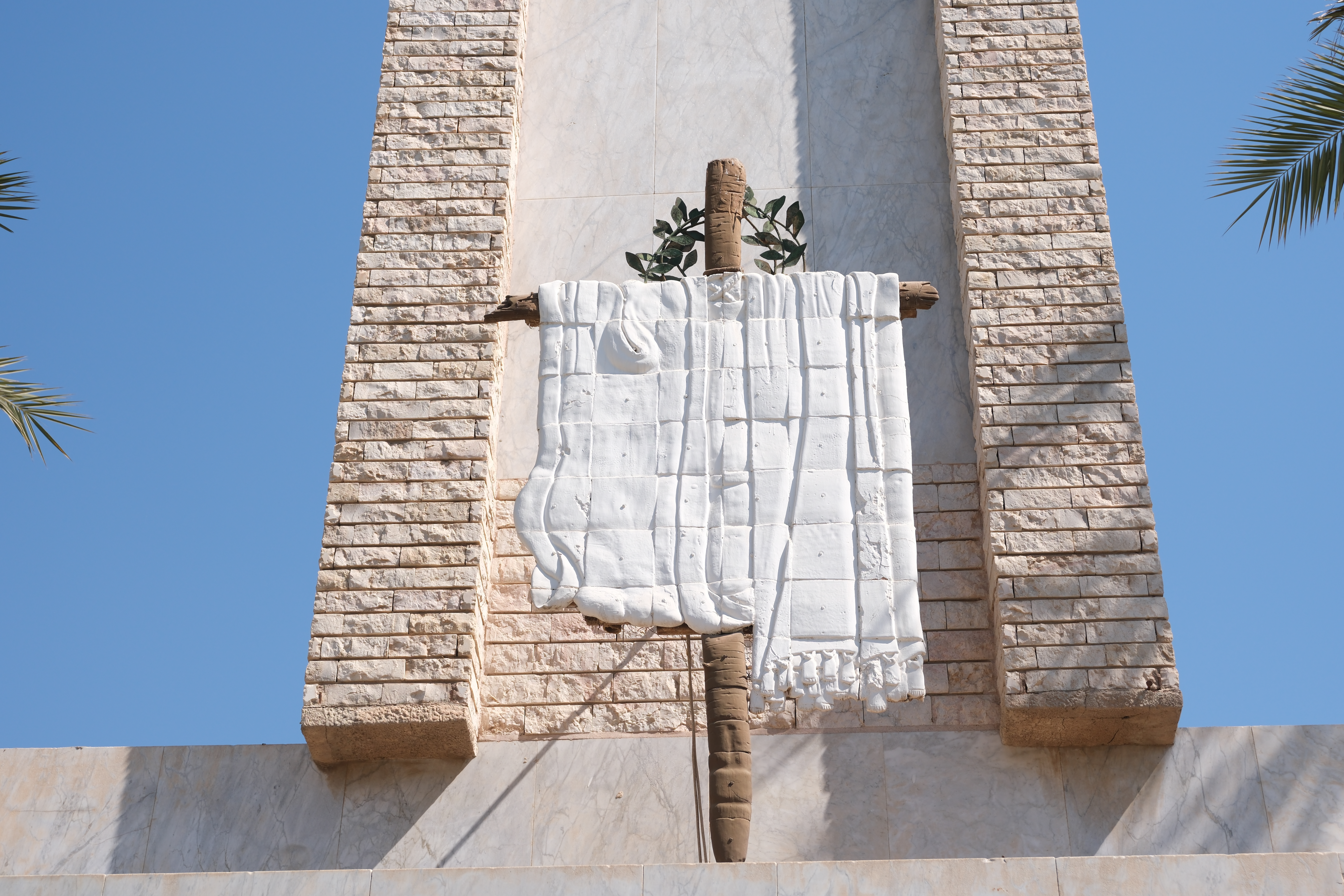
A drabsha on the front side of the Mandi

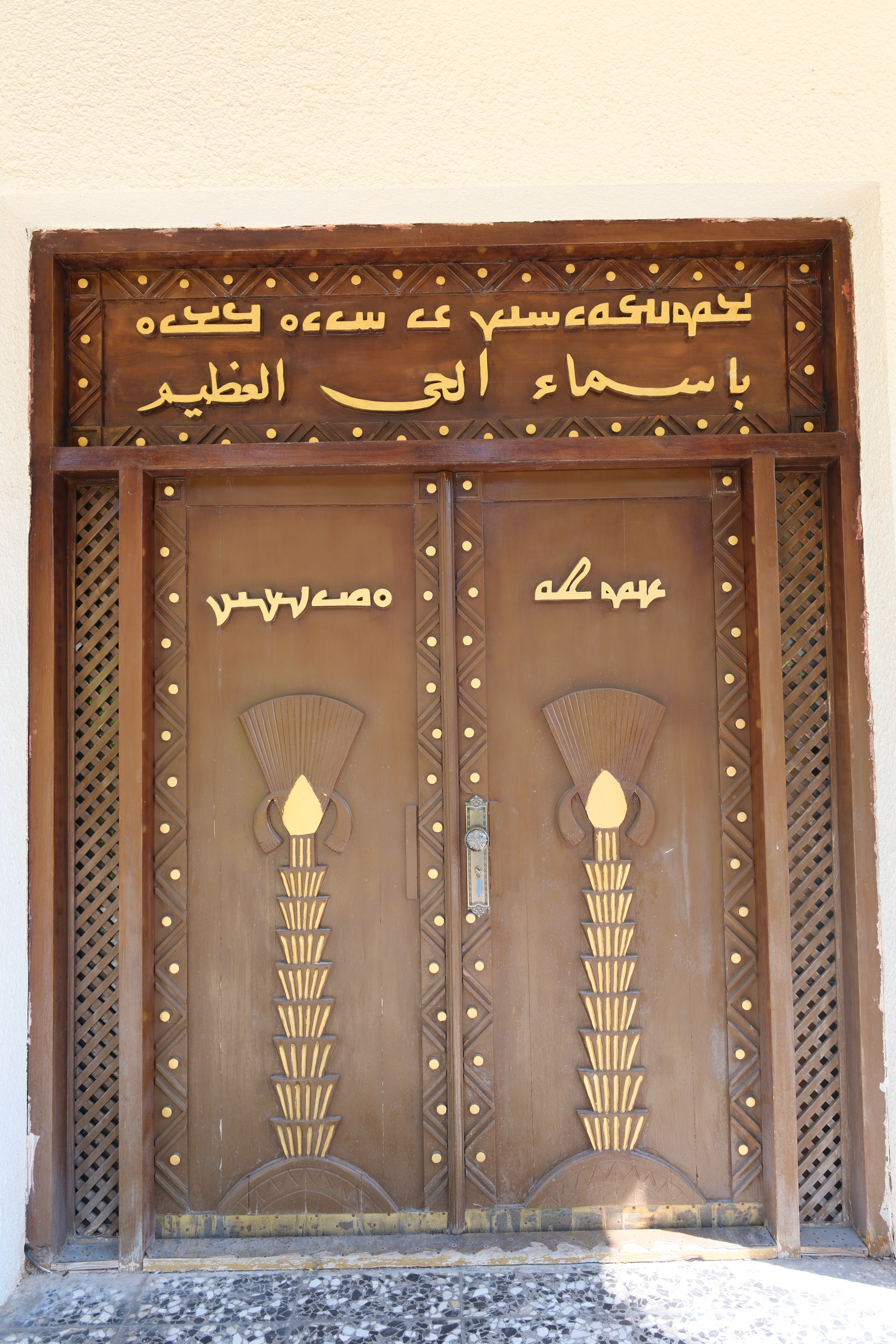
Door entrance to the Mandi, written in Classical Mandaic and Arabic

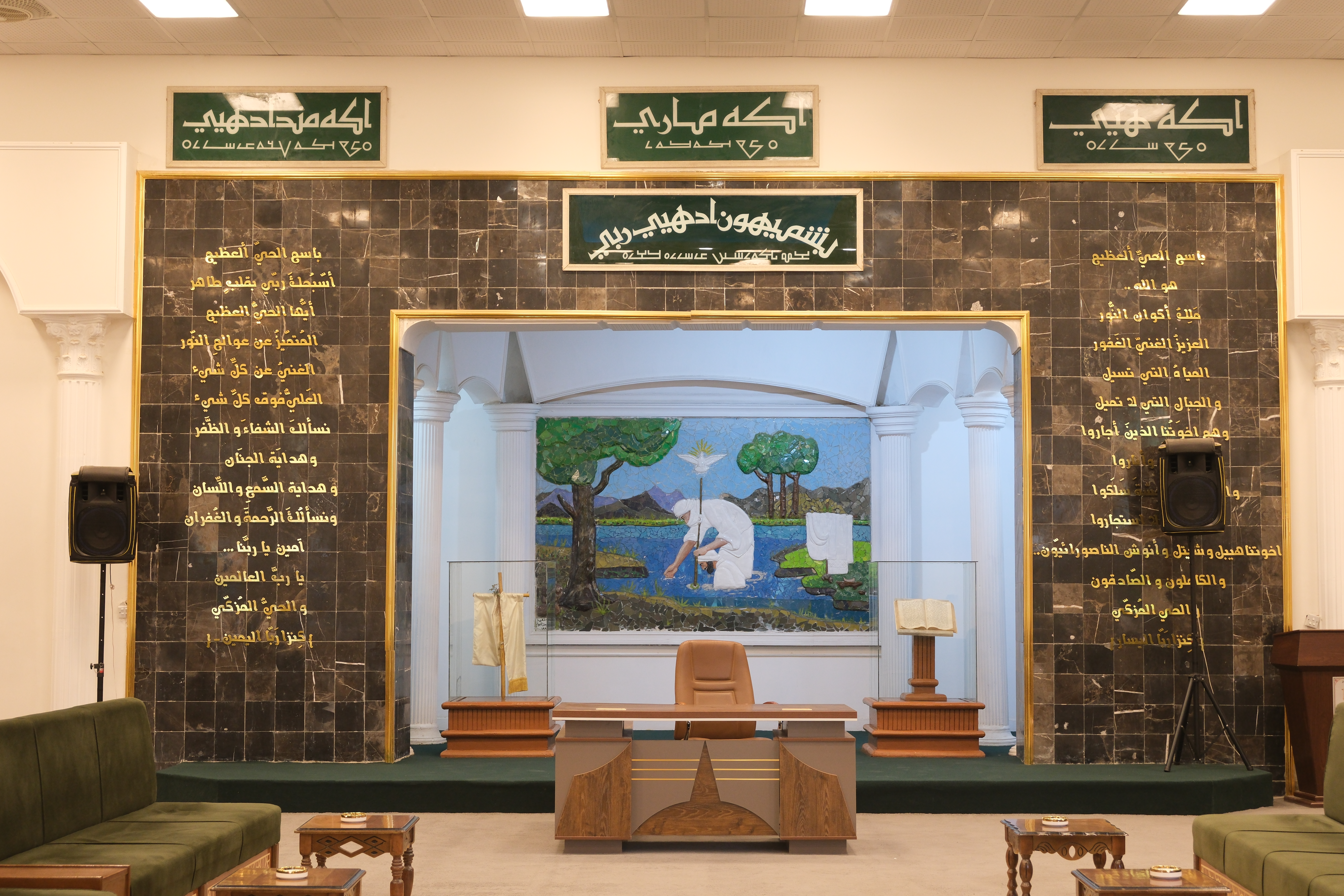
Inside the Mandi

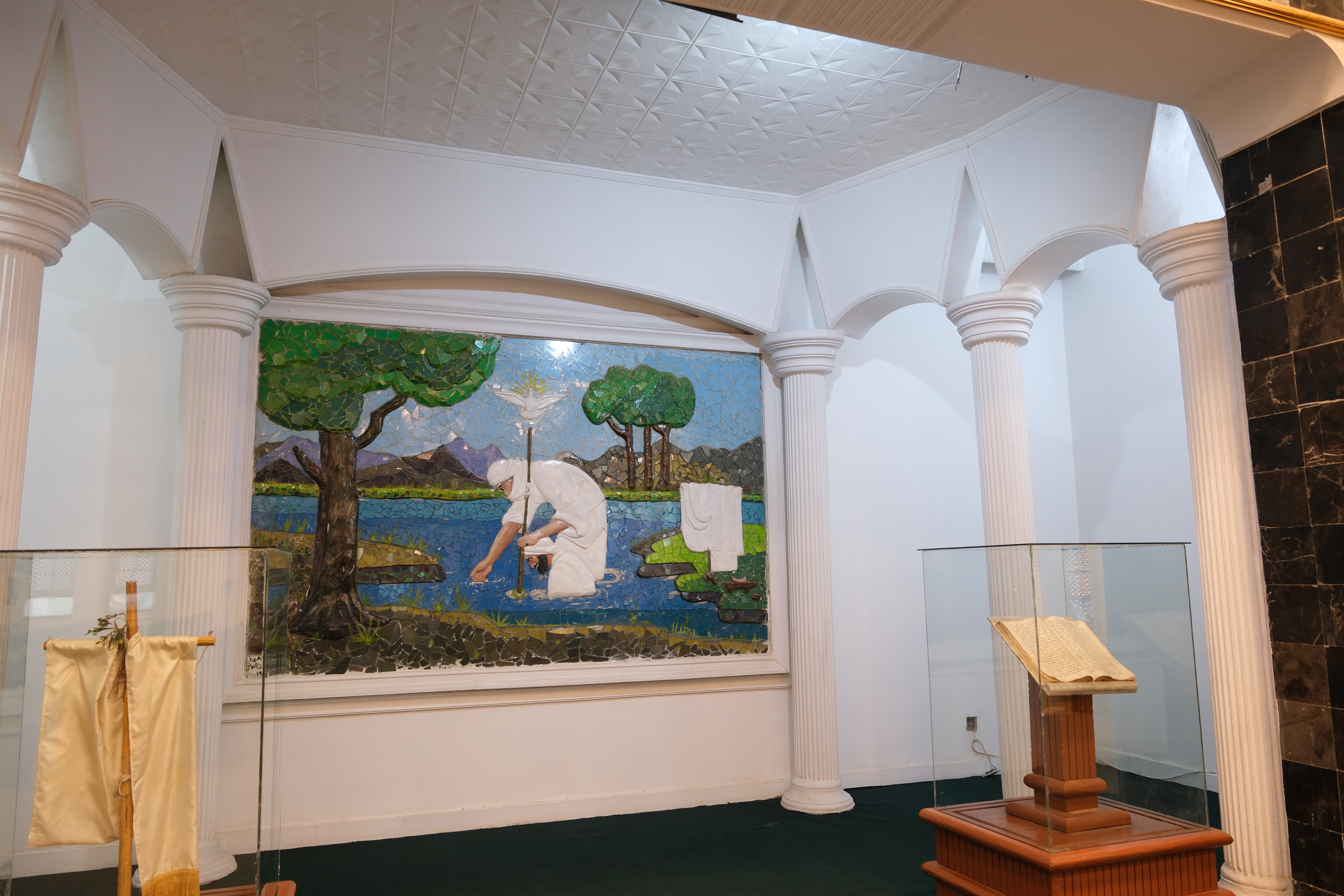

== See also ==
- Ganzibra Dakhil Mandi
- Yahya Yuhana Mandi
- Mandaeans in Iraq, in the Arabic Wikipedia
