= Şinasi Gündüz =

Turkish historian of religion

- Born: 1960 (age 65–66); Hekimhan, Malatya Province, Turkey
- Citizenship: Turkish
- Occupations: Historian of religion and professor

Academic background
- Education: University of Manchester (doctorate, 1991)
- Thesis: The origins and early history of the Mandaeans and their relation to the Sabians of the Qur'an and to the Harranians (1991)

Academic work
- Institutions: Istanbul University
- Main interests: Mandaeism; Gnosticism; Christianity

Şinasi Gündüz (born 1960, Hekimhan) is a Turkish historian of religion and professor at Istanbul University. His interests include Gnosticism, Mandaeism, Christianity, comparative religious studies, and interreligious relationships.

== Early life and education ==
Şinasi Gündüz was born in Hekimhan, Malatya Province, Turkey in 1960. He completed his primary and secondary education in Gaziantep and Mardin and graduated from Ankara University's Faculty of Theology in 1984. Between 1988 and 1991, he completed his master's studies at Durham University's School of Oriental Studies and doctorate studies at University of Manchester's Department of Middle Eastern Studies. In 1991, he completed his doctoral thesis on the relationship of the Mandaeans to the historical Sabians and Harranians. The thesis was later revised and published as a monographic supplement of Oxford's Journal of Semitic Studies, titled The Knowledge of Life (1994).

== Career ==
Gündüz became associate professor in 1995 and Professor in 2003. Between 2009 and 2012, he served as dean at Istanbul University's Faculty of Theology. Between 2012 and 2015, he served as rector of the International Balkan University in Skopje, North Macedonia. Gündüz has been a full member of the Turkish Academy of Sciences since 2012. He is an editor of the journal Milel ve Nihal.
