= Zahroun Amara =

Iraqi Mandaean niello silversmith

Zahroun Mulla Khidr Amara
- Born: late 19th century Amarah, Iraq
- Died: 1929; Amarah, Iraq
- Occupation: Silversmith / Jeweler
- Known for: silver nielloware

Zahroun Mulla Khidr bin Badran bin Qarjar Al-Zahroun Amara (Arabic: زهرون الملا خضر بن بدران بن قارجار ال زهرون عمارة), known simply as Zahroun Amara (also spelled Zahrun, Zahron or Zahroon Amarah; Arabic: زهرون عمارة; Classical Mandaic: ࡆࡀࡄࡓࡅࡍ ࡀࡌࡀࡓࡀ), was an Iraqi niello silversmith and jeweler who was born in Amarah, Iraq in the late 19th century. Zahroun Amara was a member of the Mandaean community who were famed for their silverwork.

Zahroun Amara was known by many nobles and monarchs around the world and was the doyen and most renowned of the 'Amarah Silverworkers', with his signature on silverware prized by royalty. Individuals known to have owned his silver nielloware include Sultan Abdul Hamid II, Stanley Maude, Winston Churchill, the Bahraini royal family, Egyptian King Farouk, the Iraqi royal family (including kings Faisal I and Ghazi), and the British royal family, including the Prince of Wales who became Edward VIII.

Zahroun Amara also copied Mandaic texts, including Pišra ḏ-Šambra ("A Phylactery for Rue"), for the Lebanese Christian priest and scholar Anastase-Marie al-Karmali.

== Zahroun Amara and the Emirs of Bahrain ==
The Emirs of Bahrain, when weddings and other festivities took place, entrusted Zahroun with pearls in large quantities without counting them in order for Zahroun to fashion necklaces, bracelets and other jewelry items for them. One of Zahroun's workers had a baby girl, so he asked Zahroun to make her earrings from the pearls of the Emirs of Bahrain. However, Zahroun refused and said to him, “Ask the Emir first, if he agrees, I will make one for you.” When the Emir arrived, Zahroun explained what happened with the worker. The Emir said to him, "Zahroun, the pearls are yours, and we trust you blindly, so why did you deprive him of this simple request?" Zahroun obliged and gave his worker what he wanted.

== Zahroun Amara, Churchill, and Royalty ==
After the British occupation of Iraq during World War I, Zahroun became the jeweler of kings, princes and major politicians, both from inside and outside Iraq, including King Faisal I, Ghazi bin Faisal (King Ghazi) and Lieutenant general Stanley Maude. The British Minister of Munitions at the time, Winston Churchill, had a silver cigar box commissioned by Stanley Maude which was decorated with a niello portrait of Churchill with his arm raised in addition to a niello image of the British battleship HMS Victoria. One of the Prince of Wales' (Edward VIII) highly prized possessions was a decorated cigarette case made by Zahroun. Zahroun also made items for Lady Elizabeth Bowes-Lyon (Queen Elizabeth The Queen Mother) and Farouk bin Fuad (King Farouk I). Zahroun is considered the first to insert colours into niello in Iraq by using an oven that he bought from India.

== See also ==
- Lamia Abbas
- Abdul Jabbar Abdullah
