= Dakhil Aidan =

Iraqi Mandaean religious leader and chief priest from 1917–1964

Rishama Dakhil Aidan
- دخيل عيدان
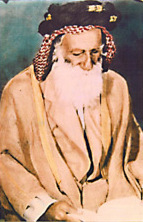
- Title: Rishama

Personal life
- Born: April 14, 1881 Amarah, Iraq
- Died: June 24, 1964 (aged 83) Dora, Baghdad, Iraq
- Citizenship: Iraqi
- Other name: Mhatam Zihrun bar Adam
- Occupation: Patriarch of the Mandaeans

Religious life
- Religion: Mandaeism

Senior posting
- Successor: Abdullah bar Sam

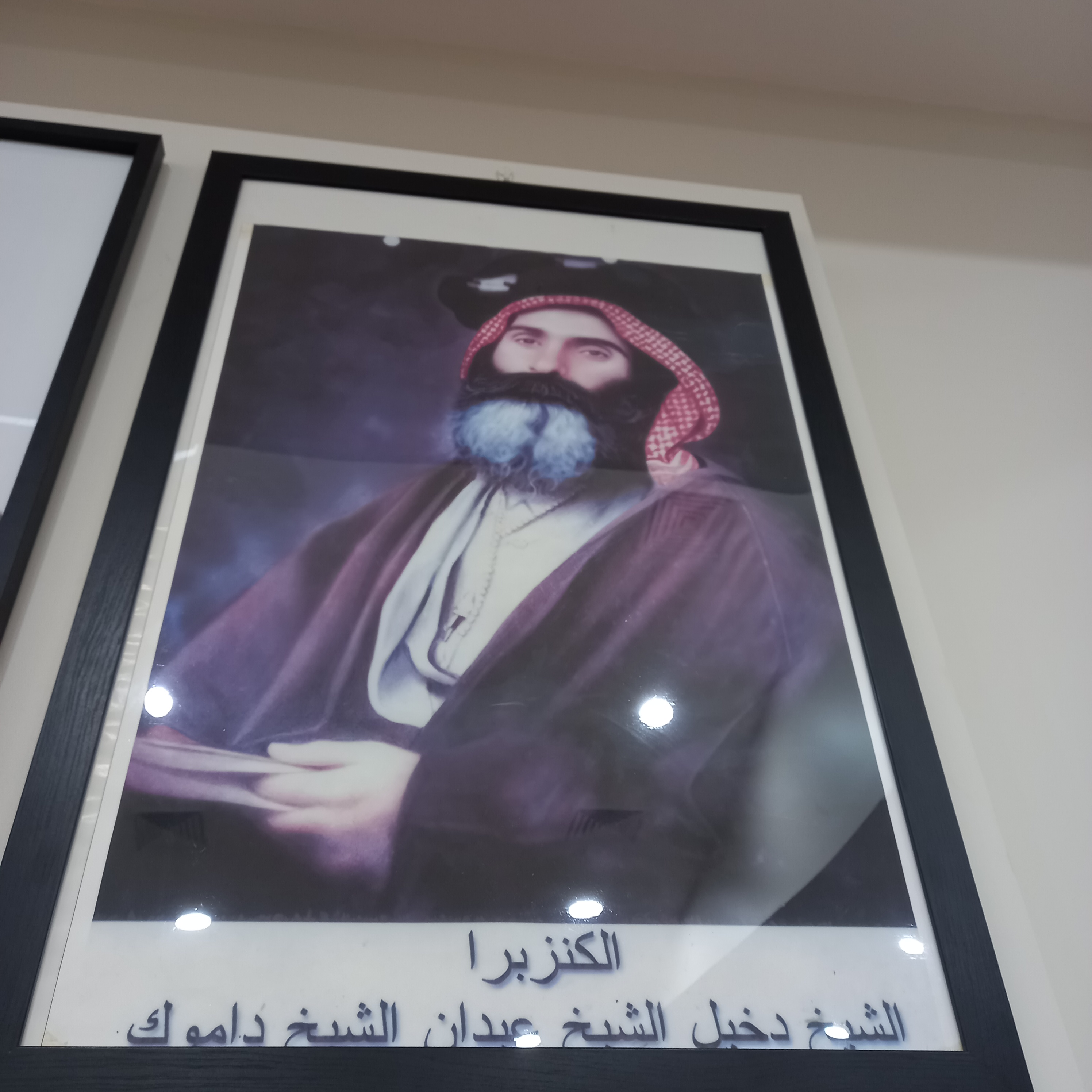
A portrait of Dakhil Aidan displayed at Ganzibra Dakhil Mandi in Liverpool, New South Wales, Australia

Sheikh (Rabbi) Ganzibra Dakhil Aidan (also spelled Dakheel Edan or Dakhil Idan, Arabic: دخيل عيدان; Mandaean baptismal name: Mhatam Zihrun bar Adam; Classical Mandaic: ࡌࡄࡀࡕࡀࡌ ࡆࡉࡄࡓࡅࡍ ࡓࡁ ࡀࡃࡀࡌ; born April 14, 1881, died June 24, 1964) was the Iraqi Mandaean patriarch and international head of the Mandaean religion from 1917 until his death in 1964. The mandi (beth manda) in Liverpool, Sydney, Australia is named in his honor (Ganzibra Dakhil Mandi).

== Biography ==
Dakhil Aidan was born on April 14, 1881, in the city of Amarah in Maysan Governorate, southern Iraq. He belonged to the Manduia lineage, a long line of Mandaean religious leaders. He was a fluent speaker of the Arabic and Mandaic languages. His father, Sheikh Aidan (also known as Adam, son of Mhatam Yuhana), died in Nasiriyah when he was 12 years old. In 1904, he became a tarmida (junior priest) in Nasiriyah at the age of 23. In 1917, he was appointed as Ganzibra (head priest) of the Mandaean community. Dakhil Aidan also became a member of the Nasiriyah municipal council in 1920. His malwasha (Mandaean baptismal name) was Mhatam Zihrun, son of Adam (Mhatam Zihrun bar Adam).

Dakhil Aidan was also a copyist. In 1898 and also in 1935, he copied the Ginza Rabba. The 1898 Ginza is currently used by the Mandaean community in Australia, while the 1935 Ginza was given to Lamea Abbas Amara in San Diego, United States.

Ganzibra Dakhil Aidan died on June 24, 1964, at his home in the Al-Dora suburb of Baghdad.

== Family ==
Dakhil Aidan's sister's daughter was the poet Lamea Abbas Amara, who spent much of her life in San Diego, United States. When he was near his death in June 1964, he bequeathed some of his manuscripts to Lamea Abbas Amara.

His father was Sheikh Aidan (baptismal name: Adam bar Mhatam Yuhana), Classical Mandaic: ࡀࡃࡀࡌ ࡁࡓ ࡌࡄࡀࡕࡀࡌ ࡉࡅࡄࡀࡍࡀ), known for copying the Ginza Rabba in 1886. His paternal grandfather was Mhatam Yuhana (also known as Sheikh Damouk).

== See also ==
- Sattar Jabbar Hilow, the current Mandaean patriarch
- Jabbar Choheili, a former Mandaean patriarch of Ahvaz, Iran
- Yahya Bihram, a 19th-century Mandaean priest (from Iraq)
- Lamia Abbas Amara, niece

Rishama (Iraq); 1917–1964	Succeeded by Abdullah bar Sam
