= Zaidoon Treeko =

Iraqi musical artist

- Born: October 10, 1961 (age 64); Baghdad, Iraq
- Origin: Iraq
- Genres: Classical crossover, Arab pop, folk pop, world, Arabic music
- Occupations: Musician, composer, singer, songwriter
- Instrument: Oud
- Years active: 1970s–present
- Labels: S Bros Entertainment http://sbrotherss.weebly.com https://www.facebook.com/brothers.official
- Website: https://www.facebook.com/zaidoontreekoofficial

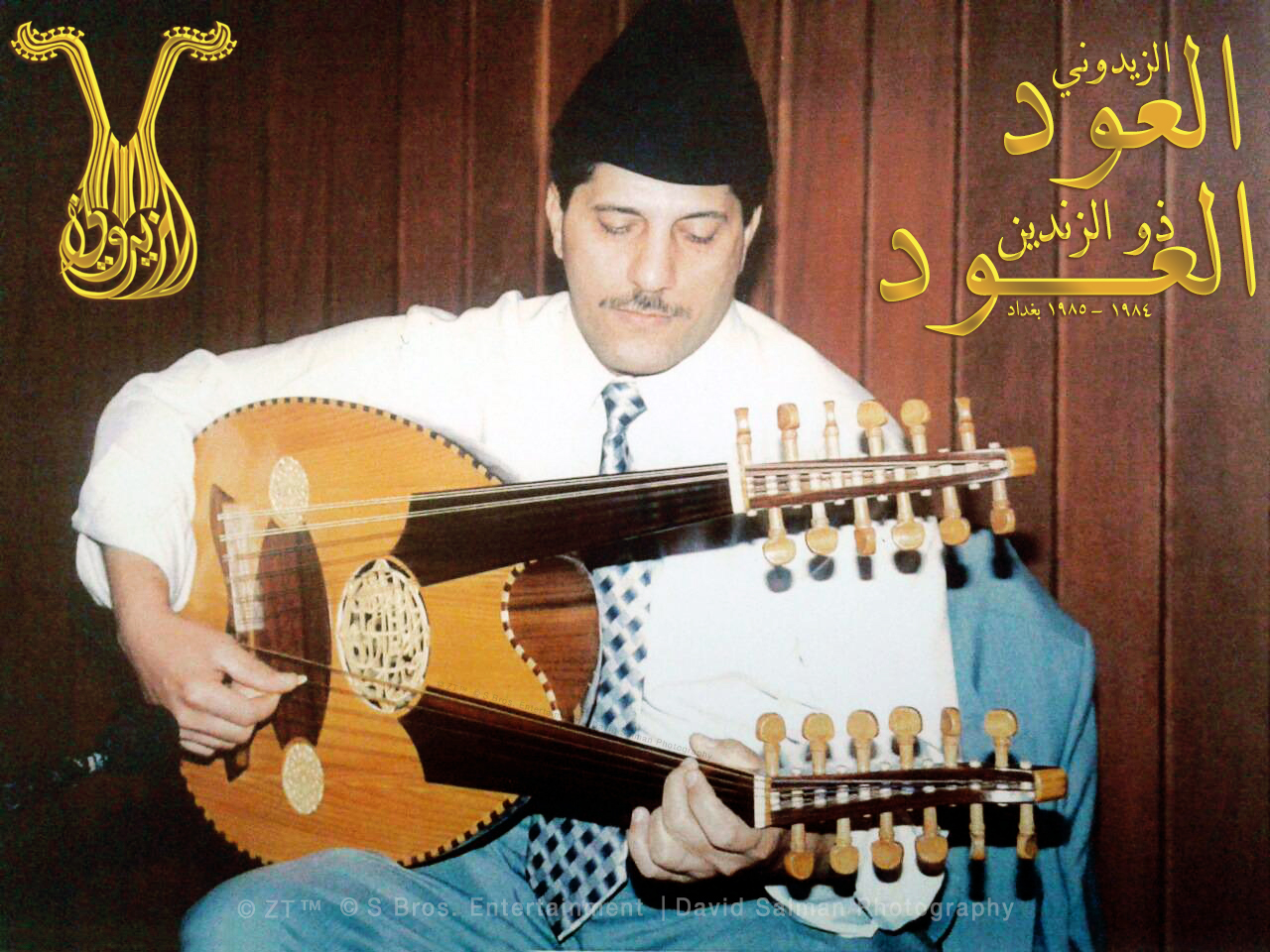
Zaidoon Treeko plays an Oud with two fingerboards

Zaidoon Treeko (Arabic: زيدون تريكو; born October 10, 1961, in Baghdad, Iraq), is an Iraqi oud player, composer, and poet.

Zaidoon Treeko, whose first name is also written alternatively as ZAIDOON, ZT, Zaidoon and his family name alternatively as TREEKO, Treeko and zt, has established himself as one of the most successful Oud makers and developers in the history of the Arab World, since the start of his career.

He began studying the oud at the age of 9 in Baghdad, following in the footsteps of his friends and teachers Hussein Kaddouri, Ruhi Khammash, Aram Abu khyam and Dean Mokhlid Mukhtar. He received his diploma from the Baghdad Academy of Music in 1984. He was the first on his class playing the Oud and top 10 in Iraq. He began to teach the oud and making it during his years at the academy, as well as continuing his own studies. Zaidoon Treeko has composed music for films, plays and television.

== Biography ==
Zaidoon is a Mandaean born in Baghdad on October 12, 1961.
