= Sattar Jabbar Hilow =

Iraqi patriarch of the Mandaean religion

Rishama Sattar Jabbar Hilow al-Zahrooni
- ستار جبار حلو الزهروني
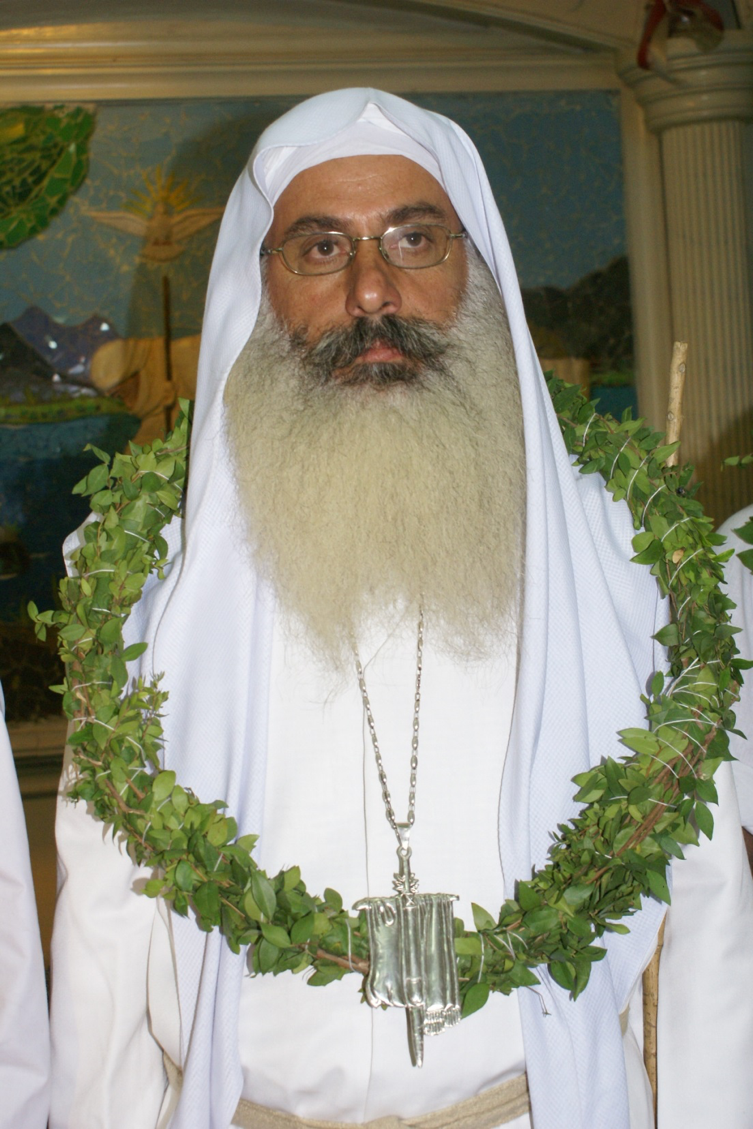
- Rishama Sattar Jabbar Hilo in 2008
- Title: Rishama

Personal life
- Born: 1956 (age 69–70) Al-Kahla, Maysan Governorate, Kingdom of Iraq (present-day Iraq)
- Citizenship: Iraqi
- Other name: Sattar Jabar Hilow
- Occupation: Patriarch of the Mandaeans

Religious life
- Religion: Mandaeism

Senior posting
- Predecessor: Abdullah bar Negm

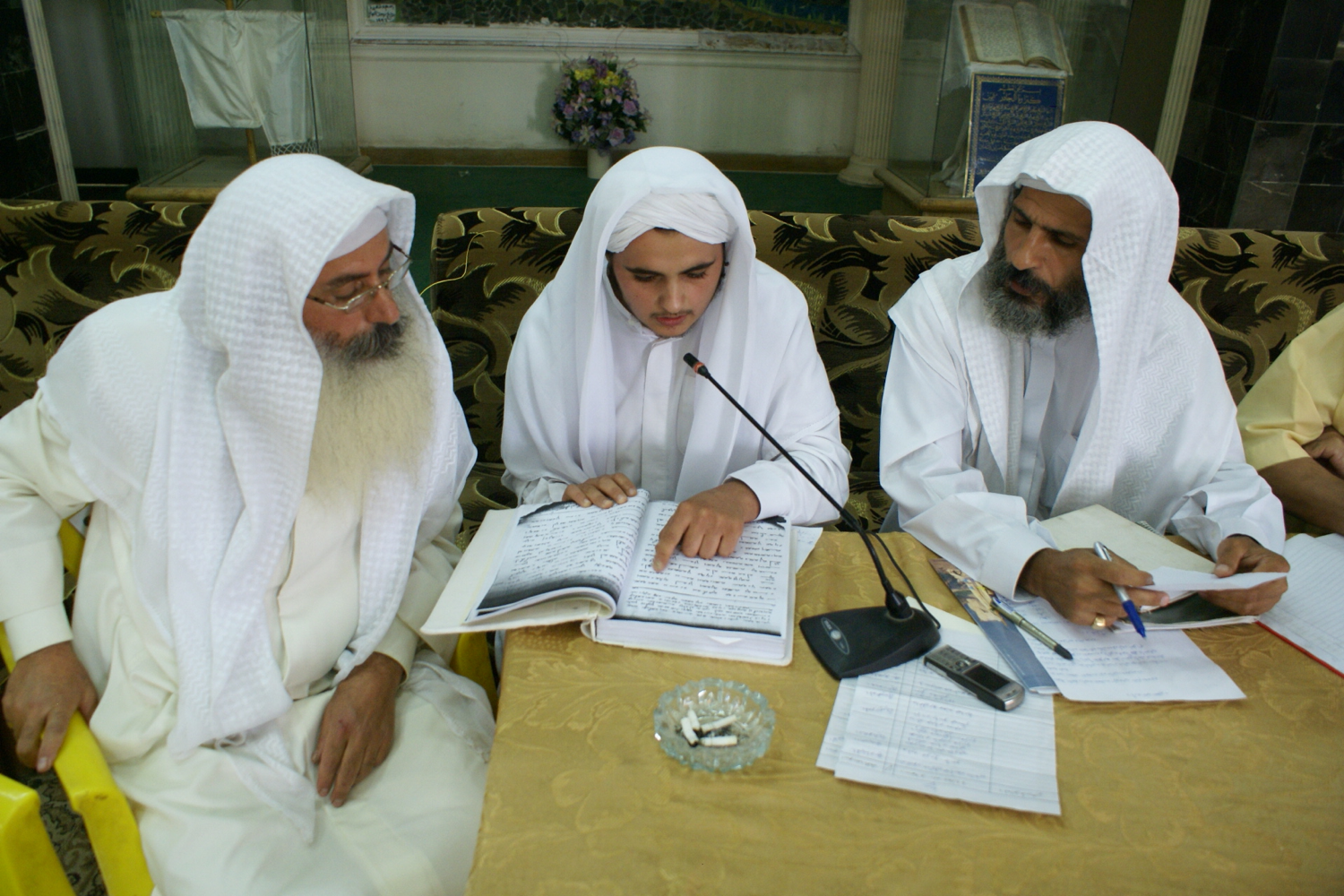
Sattar Jabbar Hilow (left) examining a tarmida candidate's knowledge of the Mandaic language and rituals in 2008

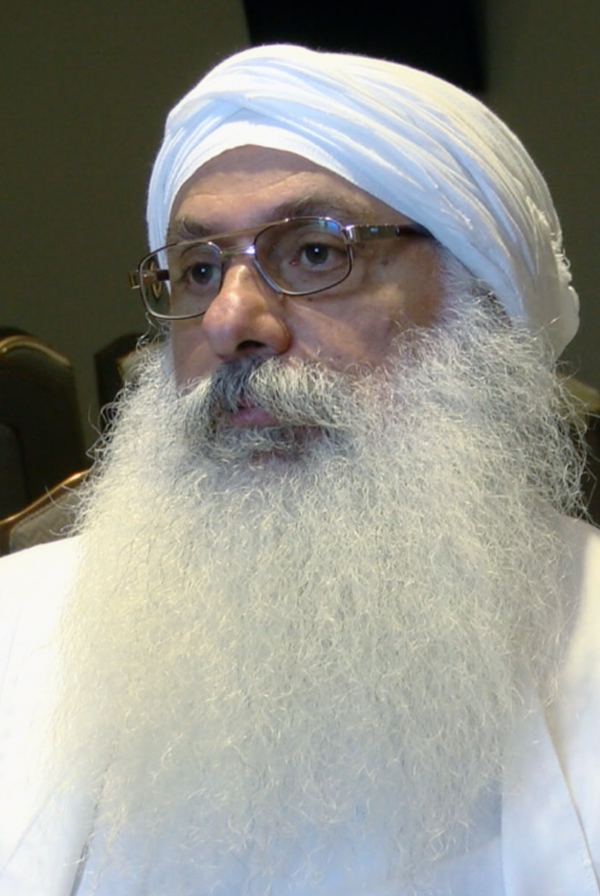
Rishamma Sattar Jabar Hilow in July 2016

Rishama Sattar Jabbar Hilow al-Zahrooni (Arabic: الريش امه ستار جبار حلو الزهروني; also known as His Holiness Ganzevra Sattar Jabbar Hilo al-Zahrony; born 1956, Al-Kahla, Maysan Governorate, Iraq) is the patriarch and international head of the Mandaean religion. He is currently based in Baghdad, Iraq, where he has served as the head of the Sabian–Mandaean Mandi of Baghdad since 2000. The head priest before him was Rishama Abdullah bar Negm, who had served as the head priest of the Sabian–Mandaean Mandi of Baghdad from 1981 to 1999.

Rishama Sattar Jabbar Hilow has spoken at many conferences and seminars abroad to raise awareness of the human rights crisis among the Mandaeans of Iraq and Iran.

== See also ==
- Dakhil Aidan, the Mandaean patriarch from 1917 to 1964 in Iraq
- Abdullah bar Negm, a former Mandaean patriarch of Baghdad
- Jabbar Choheili, a former Mandaean patriarch of Ahvaz, Iran
- Salah Choheili, the current Mandaean patriarch in Australia
- Yahya Bihram, a 19th-century Mandaean priest (from Iraq)

Preceded by Abdullah bar Sam	Rishama (Iraq); 2000–present
