= Gozinesh =

Iranian law

In Iran, the Gozinesh Law (passed in 1985) has the effect of prohibiting a number of religious and ethnic minorities from fully participating in civil life. This law and other gozinesh provisions make access to employment, education, and a range of other areas conditional upon a rigorous ideological screening, the principal prerequisite for which is devotion to the tenets of Islam.

These laws are regularly applied to discriminate against religious and ethnic groups that are not officially recognized, such as the Mandaeans, Ahl-e Haq, and followers of the Baháʼí Faith. The United Nations has repeatedly expressed concern over this practice in the reports of UN Secretary-General, in the reports of ILO, and so on. Some recent examples of such concerns are given below:

28. The Committee on the Elimination of Racial Discrimination, after considering the combined eighteenth and nineteenth periodic reports of the Islamic Republic of Iran in August 2010, expressed concern at the limited enjoyment of political, economic, social and cultural rights by, among other things, Arab, Azeri, Baloch and Kurdish communities and some communities of non-citizens, in particular with regard to housing, education, freedom of expression and religion, health and employment, despite the economic growth in the country. The Committee drew particular attention to reports regarding the application of the “gozinesh” criterion, a selection procedure requiring prospective State officials and employees to demonstrate allegiance to the Islamic Republic of Iran and the State religion, and expressed concern that it might limit employment opportunities and political participation for members of Arab, Azeri, Baloch, Jewish, Armenian and Kurdish communities (see CERD/C/IRN/CO/18-19).

Regarding the current position of the Iran's Government concerning the law of gozinesh, ILO notes the following:

Discrimination on the basis of religion and ethnicity

The Committee notes that this Committee and the Conference Committee have on a number of occasions highlighted the seriousness of the situation of unrecognized religious minorities, in particular the Baháʼí, and the urgency of taking decisive action to combat discrimination against them. <...> The Committee also notes that EI has expressed concern regarding the religious-based discrimination against the Baháʼí in terms of access to education, universities, and to particular occupations in the public sector.

With respect to the practice of gozinesh, a selection procedure requiring prospective state officials and employees to demonstrate allegiance to the state religion, the Government states that two positions have been put forward regarding the Selection Law based on Religious and Ethical Standards, 1995: one group proposed that it be abolished, with selection decisions being solely based on qualifications; the second group proposed the amendment of some of the provisions of the Law. Both proposals were rejected, the first by a majority of members of Parliament, and the second by the Guardian Council.

The Government states that the Law recognizes not only Islam, but also the religions officially recognized in the Constitution. The Committee notes, however, that unrecognized religious minorities remain subject to the practice of gozinesh.
