= Edmondo Lupieri =

Italian New Testament scholar (born 1950)

- Born: November 10, 1950 (age 75); Turin, Italy
- Occupation: New Testament scholar

Academic work
- Institutions: Loyola University Chicago

Edmondo F. Lupieri (born 10 November 1950 in Turin) is an Italian New Testament scholar. He is an alumnus of the University of Pisa, where he earned the Laurea in Classical Studies with the distinction of summa cum laude, and of the Scuola Normale Superiore di Pisa, where he earned the Licenza in Lettere. He taught at the universities of Rome, Turin, and Udine. From 2006 to 2025, he held the John Cardinal Cody Endowed Chair at Loyola University Chicago, where he taught New Testament and Early Christianity (Emeritus since July 2025).

He has published books and articles on New Testament, Early Christianity, Christian and non-Christian Gnosticism, various phenomena of religious Syncretism involving Christian elements, modern and contemporary Christian history.

== Works ==
Works by Edmondo Lupieri:

=== Books ===
- John of the Mandaeans: A New English Edition (translated from the original 1988 Italian book), Gorgias Press, 2026. ISBN 9781463250027
- “Who Is Sitting On Which Beast?” Interpretative Issues in the Book of Revelation. Proceedings of the International Conference held at Loyola University Chicago, March 30–31, 2017 (co-edited and co-authored), Brepols, Turnhout 2023
- The Synoptic Problem 2022: Proceedings of the Loyola University Conference (co-edited and co-authored), Peeters, Leuven 2023
- Non uno itinere. Ebraismi, cristianesimi, modernità. Studi in onore di Mauro Pesce in occasione del suo ottantesimo compleanno (co-edited and co-authored), Morcelliana, Brescia 2021.
- I mille volti della Maddalena. Saggi e studi (edited), Carocci Ed., Roma, 2020.
- Mary Magdalene from the New Testament to the New Age and Beyond (edited and co-authored) Brill, Leiden, 2019. ISBN 9789004411067
- Chi ha rubato i cieli? Galileo, la Lettera a Cristina e le origini della modernità (co-edited with Paolo Ponzio), Edizioni di Pagina, Bari, 2019.
- Golden Calf Traditions in Early Judaism, Christianity, and Islam (co-edited with Eric F. Mason and co-authored) (TBN, 23), Brill, Leiden/Boston, 2018. ISBN 9789004386754
- Where Have All the Heavens Gone? Galileo’s Letter to the Grand Duchess Christina (co-edited with John P. McCarthy), Cascade Books, Eugene (OR), 2017.
- Una sposa per Gesù. Maria Maddalena tra antichità e postmoderno (edited and co-authored) (Frecce, 241), Carocci Ed., Rome, 2017 (repr. 2018, 2019).
- In nome di Dio. Storie di una conquista (Biblioteca di cultura religiosa 72), Paideia, Brescia, 2014.
  - translated into English as In the Name of God: the making of global Christianity Transl. by Giovanna Lammers, Revised by the Author, with J. Hooten and A. Kunder, Wm. B. Eerdmans Publ. Co., Grand Rapids (MI) / Cambridge (UK), 2011.ISBN 9780802840172
- Giovanni e Gesù. Storia di un antagonismo (Frecce 161), Carocci, Rome, 2013. ISBN 9788839404145
- A Commentary to the Apocalypse of John, Transl. by Maria Poggi Johnson and Adam Kamesar, Wm. B. Eerdmans Publ. Co., Grand Rapids (MI) / Cambridge (UK), 2006. ISBN 9780802860736
- Identità e conquista. Esiti e conflitti di un'evangelizzazione, Edizioni Dehoniane, Bologna, 2005.
- The Mandaeans: The Last Gnostics (ITSORS), W. B. Eerdmans Publ. Co., Grand Rapids (MI) / Cambridge (UK) 2002. ISBN 9780802839244
- L'Apocalisse di Giovanni (Scrittori Greci e Latini), Fondazione Lorenzo Valla - A. Mondadori Editore, Milano 1999, 5th reprint 2009. English edition, Wm. B. Eerdmans Publ. Co., Grand Rapids, MI (2006).
- "Fra Gerusalemme e Roma," in G. Filoramo - D. Menozzi, Storia del Cristianesimo, vol. I: L'Antichità, Roma-Bari 1997, pp. 3–137. 6th reprint 2009.
- Gesù Cristo e gli altri dei. Diffusione e modificazione del cristianesimo nei paesi extraeuropei (Oscar Saggi, 394), Milano, Mondadori, 1994.
- I Mandei. Gli ultimi gnostici (Biblioteca di Cultura Religiosa, 61), Brescia, Paideia 1993, pp. 352. Reprint 2010. English edition: The Mandaeans: The Last Gnostics (Wm. B. Eerdmans Publ. Co., Grand Rapids, MI), 2002.
- Giovanni e Gesù. Storia di un antagonismo (Uomini e Religioni, 60), Milano, Mondadori 1991.
- Giovanni Battista nelle tradizioni sinottiche (Studi Biblici, 82), Brescia, Paideia 1988.
- Il cielo è il mio trono. Isaia 40,12 e 66,1 nella tradizione testimoniaria (Temi e Testi, 28), Roma, Ed. di Storia e Letteratura 1980.

=== Non-academic books ===
- Il peccato dei padri (2009)
- Il patto. Un thriller teologico (2005)
- Nel segno del sangue (2003)
