= Mandaean Australians =

المندائيون الأستراليون (Arabic)

Total population
- c. 15,000

Regions with significant populations
- primarily in Western Sydney (Liverpool and nearby areas)

Languages
- Mandaic, Arabic, Persian, English

Religion
- Mandaeism

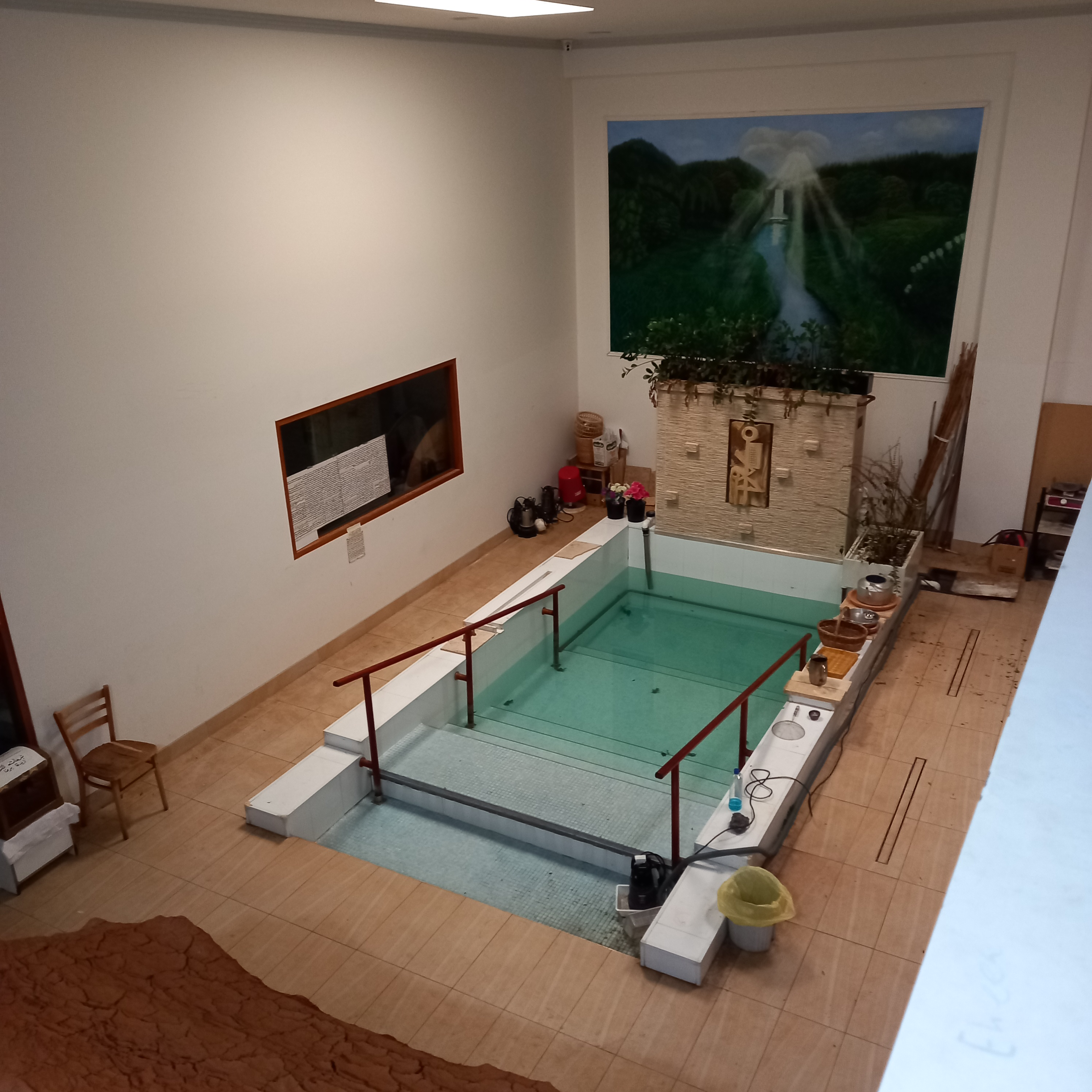
Interior of Yahya Yuhana Mandi in Sydney

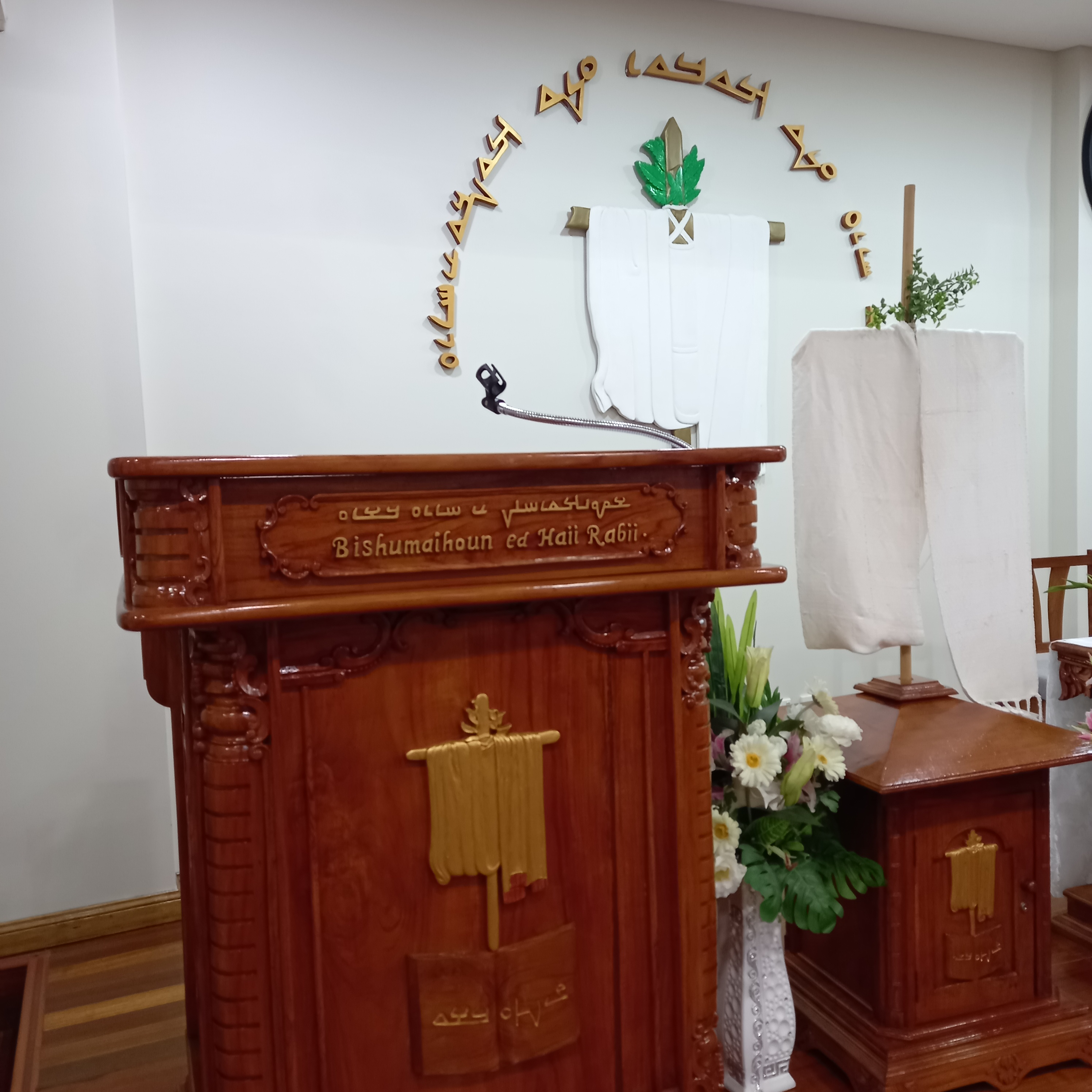
Interior of Ganzibra Dakhil Mandi in Sydney

Mandaean Australians (Arabic: المندائيون الأستراليون) are Australians of Mandaean descent or Mandaeans who have Australian citizenship. Most Mandaeans in Australia live in Greater Western Sydney.

As of 2023, Australia has the largest Mandaean population in the world, followed by Sweden (which has the largest Mandaean population in Europe) and the United States.

== Sydney metropolitan area ==
The Sydney metropolitan area in Australia has the largest Mandaean diaspora community in the world. The community is centered in Greater Western Sydney suburbs such as Fairfield, Liverpool, and Penrith. In Liverpool, the main mandi (Beth Manda) is Ganzibra Dakhil Mandi. The Sabian Mandaean Association of Australia has purchased land by the banks of the Nepean River at Wallacia, New South Wales, where Wallacia Mandi is currently being built. Another mandi in Greater Sydney is Yahya Yuhana Mandi (or Mandi Yehya Youhanna), located in Prestons.

In Western Sydney, Mandaeans mainly perform masbuta (baptisms) at Lighthorse Park in Liverpool, Yahya Yuhana Mandi, and Wallacia Mandi.

== Associations ==
The Sabian Mandaean Association in Australia is the largest Mandaean association in Australia. Religious affairs are managed by the Mandaean Synod of Australia.

== Notable people ==
- Salah Choheili (born 1952 in Iran), the current Rishama and head priest of Ganzibra Dakhil Mandi in Liverpool, New South Wales
- Brikha Nasoraia (born 1964 in Iraq), Rishama, professor, and President of the International Mandaean Nasoraean Supreme Council and Nasoraean Mandaean Association
- Khaldoon Majid Abdullah (born 1963 in Iraq), the head priest of Mandi Yehya Youhanna in Prestons, New South Wales
- Majid Fandi Al-Mubaraki, a Mandaean living in Australia who has digitised many Mandaean texts using typesetted Mandaic script
- Yuhana Nashmi, artist, photographer, writer, and archivist
- Peyam Jizan (born 1978 in Iran), a tarmida in Sydney
- Sahi Bashikh, a tarmida in Sydney
- Thamir Shamkhi, a tarmida in Sydney
- Asaad Othmani, a tarmida in Sydney
- Waleed Khashan (born 1963 in Iran; Persian: Waleed Ebadeh Farzadeh; Arabic: Waleed Abdul Razzaq), a tarmida in Sydney
- Carlos Gelbert (born 1948 in Basra, Iraq), a writer, novelist, and translator in Sydney

== See also ==
- Iraqi Australians
- Iranian Australians
- Assyrian Australians
- Mandaean Americans
- Mandaeans in Sweden
- Mandaeans in Iraq (Arabic Wikipedia)
