= Mandi (Mandaeism) =

Temple in Mandaeism

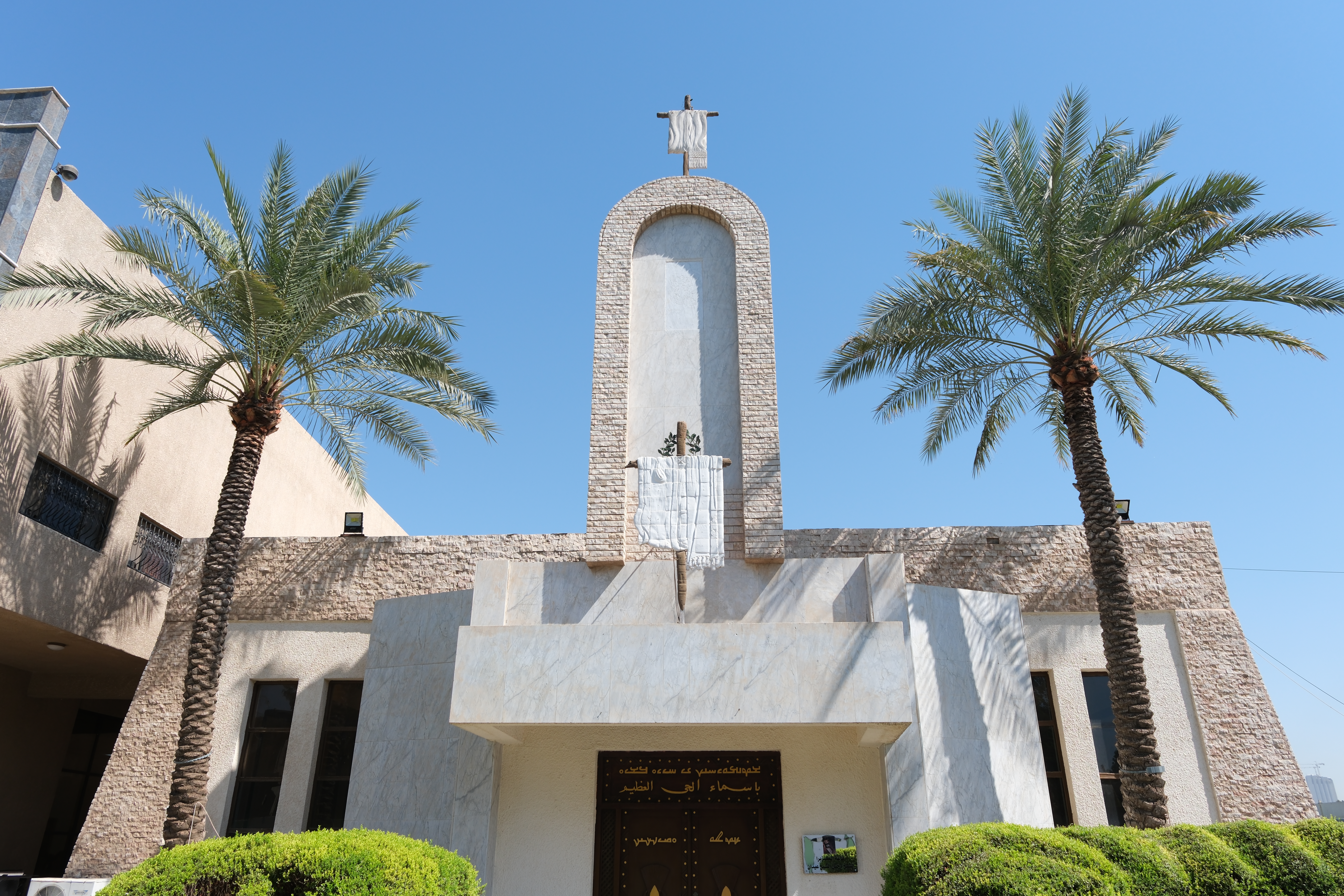
Mandaean Beth Manda (Mashkhanna) in Baghdad, 2024

A mandi (ࡌࡀࡍࡃࡉࡀ mandia), mashkhanna (ࡌࡀࡔࡊࡍࡀ maškna), or beth manda (beit manda, ࡁࡉࡕ ࡌࡀࡍࡃࡀ bit manda, 'house of knowledge'; also bimanda), is a Mandaean building that serves as a community center and place of worship. A mandi is traditionally built on the banks of a yardna, or flowing river.

Although mandis are traditionally "cult-huts" made of straw, bamboo, and mud that are built by the river, nowadays mandis can also be modern buildings that serve as community houses and local administrative centers. A mandi typically holds weekly worship services, weddings, and many other important events and rituals.

Unlike in Islam, Christianity, or Yazidism, the mandi itself is not considered to be a shrine or pilgrimage site. This is because Mandaeism does not have shrines or holy sites tied to specific geographical locations, since any river with flowing water can be used for religious rituals.

== Etymology ==
The Mandaic word mandi (written Mandaic: mandia ࡌࡀࡍࡃࡉࡀ) is derived from Pahlavi mʾnd (mānd) 'dwelling place'.

== In Iraq ==
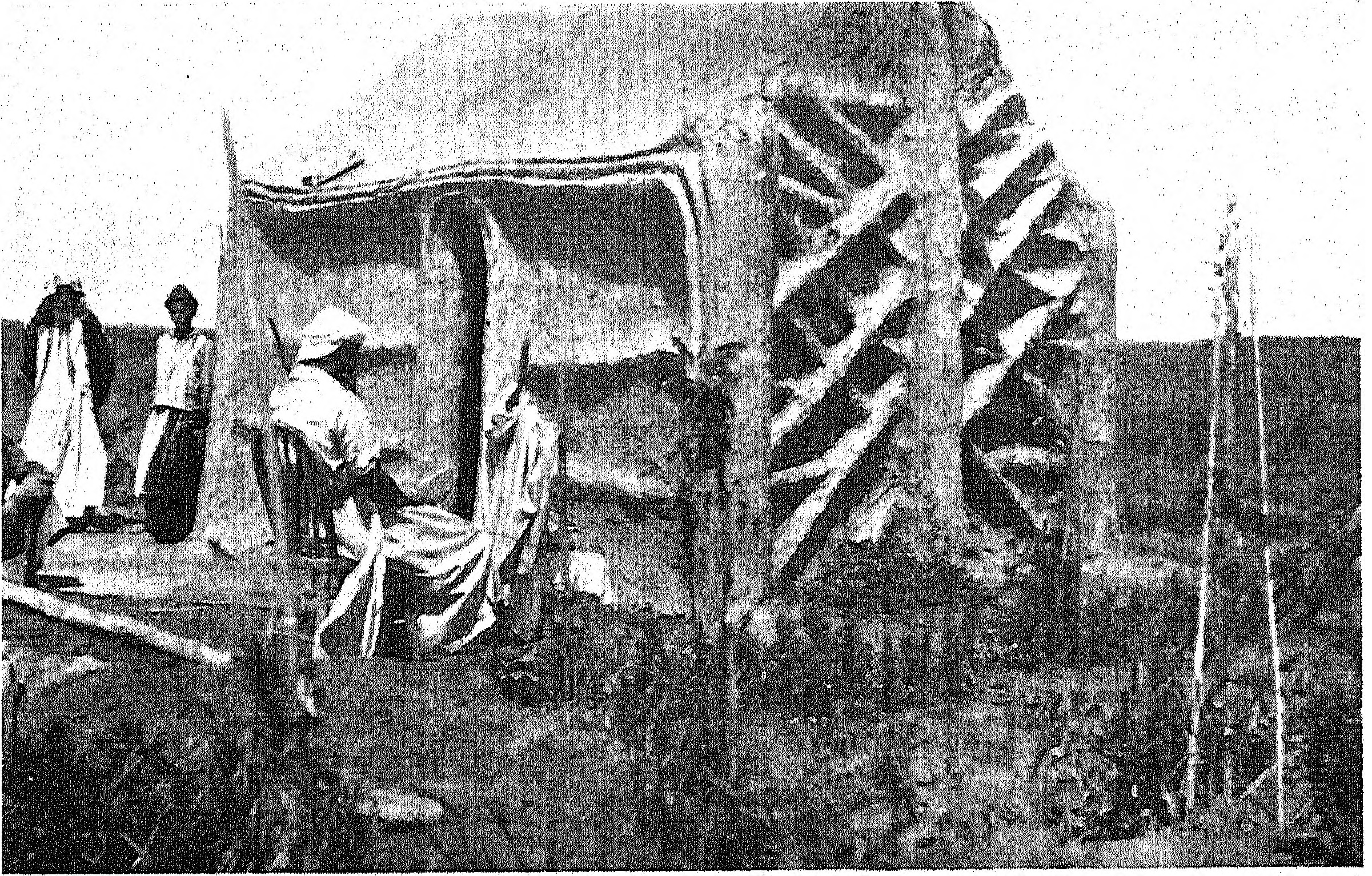
A mandi at Liṭlaṭa, near Qal'at Saleh, southern Iraq (1930s)

A contemporary-style mandi is located in Nasiriyah, Iraq.

The historical village of Liṭlaṭa in Qal'at Saleh District, southern Iraq was also the site of a Mandaean mandi that the British scholar E. S. Drower often visited.

In Baghdad, the main mandi is called the Sabian Mandi of Baghdad. It is located on the western banks of the Tigris River in the central Baghdad neighborhood of Al-Qadisiyah. In addition to Baghdad and Nasiriyah, mandis can also be found in Amarah, Kirkuk, Erbil, and Diwaniyah.

== In Iran ==
The main mandi of the Mandaean community in Iran is located in Ahvaz. It is administered and maintained by the Mandaean Council of Ahvaz.

== Outside Iraq and Iran ==
On 15 September 2018, Beth Manda Yardna was consecrated in Dalby, Skåne County, Sweden. It contains an indoor baptismal pool, since Sweden's rivers cannot be used for baptismal rituals during the winter.

In Australia, the Sabian Mandaean Association in Australia purchased land by the banks of the Nepean River at Wallacia, New South Wales in order to build a mandi called Mandi Wallacia. The current mandi in Liverpool, Sydney is Ganzibra Dakhil Mandi, named after Ganzibra Dakhil Edan. Another mandi exists in Prestons, New South Wales, named Mandi Yehya Youhanna.

There is a mandi in Warren, Michigan, United States that is run by the local Mandaean community. In the United States, there are also mandis in San Antonio, Texas, Amarillo, Texas, and Worcester, Massachusetts.

In Nieuwegein, Utrecht, Netherlands, there is a mandi called Vereniging Mandi van de Mandeeërs Gemeenschap in Nederland (Mandi Association of the Mandaean Community in the Netherlands).

== Notable mandis ==
- Iraq
  - Baghdad (Sabian–Mandaean Mandi of Baghdad)
  - Nasiriyah (Sabian–Mandaean Mandi of Nasiriyah)
  - Amarah (Sabian–Mandaean Mandi of Amarah)
- Iran
  - Ahvaz (Mandaean Council of Ahvaz)
- Australia
  - Sydney (three mandis: Ganzibra Dakhil Mandi, Yahya Yuhana Mandi, Wallacia Mandi)
- United States
  - San Antonio, Texas (Mandaean Cultural Center of San Antonio)
  - Amarillo, Texas (Amarillo Mandaean Association)
  - Warren, Michigan (Mandaean Association of Michigan)
  - Leicester, Massachusetts (Mandaean Community of Massachusetts)
- Sweden
  - Dalby (Mandeiska Beth-Manda Yardna)
  - Södertälje
  - Sandviken (Mandeiska kyrkan i Sandviken)
- Netherlands
  - Nieuwegein (Vereniging Mandi van de Mandeeërs Gemeenschap in Nederland)

== Essene parallels ==
The bit manda is described as biniana rba ḏ-šrara ("the Great building of Truth") and bit tušlima ("house of Perfection") in Mandaean texts such as the Qulasta, Ginza Rabba, and the Mandaean Book of John. The only known literary parallels are in Essene texts from Qumran such as the Community Rule, which has similar phrases such as the "house of Perfection and Truth in Israel" (Community Rule 1QS VIII 9) and "house of Truth in Israel."

== See also ==
- Baptistery
- Church
- Mandir
- Synagogue
- Tabernacle
- Temple
- Ghat in Hinduism
