= Mandaeans in Sweden =

Mandaean diaspora in Sweden

Mandaeans in Sweden mandéer i Sverige
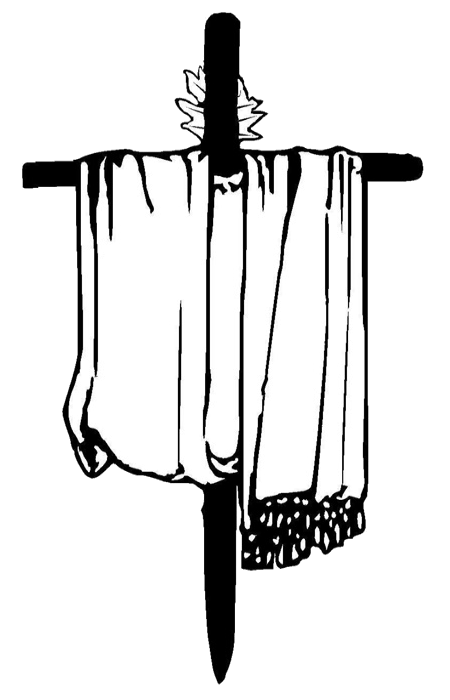
- Darfash (Mandaean cross), symbol of Mandaeaism

Total population
- 12,410

Regions with significant populations
- Stockholm, Malmö, Södertälje, and other cities

Languages
- Swedish, Arabic, Persian, Mandaic

Related ethnic groups
- Arabs in Sweden, Assyrians in Sweden, Swedish Iraqis, Kurds in Sweden, Swedish Iranians

Sweden is home to one of the largest communities of the Mandaean ethnoreligious group, numbering between 10,000–20,000 people (2019). By comparison, there are now only about 3,000 Mandaeans in Iraq. Several thousand Swedish Mandaeans were granted asylum status as refugees from persecution in Iraq and Syria. Sweden is currently home to the largest Mandaean community in Europe.

== History ==
The first Mandaeans came to Sweden in the 1970s, including the al-Khafaji family who owned a goldsmithing business on Kungsgatan in Stockholm. The first Mandaean religious worship took place in 1997 when a tarmida (Mandaean priest) from the Netherlands was visiting. Following the Iraq War, there was an influx of refugees from Iraq.

== Priests ==
As of 2018, there was a total of 8 tarmidas living in Sweden under the leadership of 2 genzibras (bishop or high priest), up from a total of 8 Mandaean priests in 2015. Some of the ganzibras are Salwan Alkhamas (from Basra) and Walid Abdul Razzak.

Other priests include Tarmida Qais Edan and Ganzibra Salam Ghaiad. Qais Edan, originally from Baghdad with parents originating from Amarah, left Iraq in 2000. He moved to Jordan, then to Germany, and on to Sweden.

== Temples ==
Sweden's first Mandaean place of worship, or mandi, was consecrated in Sandviken in 2003.

Södertälje also has a mandi. Rishama Salwan Alkhamas (also known as Salwan Shakir Khamas), based at the Södertälje mandi, is the Rishama of the Mandaean community in Sweden and Finland.

In 2015, the Mandeiska Församlingen i Örebro (Mandaean Congregation of Örebro) purchased a Christian church building in Hallsberg and converted it into a mandi. However, in 2021, they announced that the mandi would be moved to Södertälje, where more Mandaeans reside, and that the building would be sold.

On September 15, 2018, Sweden's largest and first purpose-built mandi, Beth Manda Yardna, was consecrated in Dalby, Scania, Sweden.

== Organizations ==
The Mandeiska Sabeiska Samfundet (Mandaean Sabian Society) is the main organization overseeing the Mandaean community in Sweden. In 2003, the Mandeiska Sabeiska Samfundet built Europe's first mandi in Sandviken. It has also built Mandaean cemeteries in Tyresö and in Södertälje.

== Demographics ==
=== Population ===
Most Mandaeans in Sweden are from Iraq, with very few Iranian Mandaeans living in Sweden.

Most Mandaeans in Sweden live in Scania in the south of the country, and in the Stockholm region, with a growing population of about 1,500 people in Södertälje. According to Tarmida Qais Edan, as of 2018, there are over 3,000 Mandaeans in southern Sweden, including approximately 1,200–1,300 in Malmö and 900 in Lund.

Historical census estimates of the Mandaean population in Sweden based on data from the SST and the Mandeiska Samfundet:

- 2012: 8,080
- 2015: 10,000
- 2016: 17,500 (Routledge)
- 2018: 9,000 to 11,000 (belonging to 14 clans)
- 2019: 20,000 (Routledge)

In contrast, Sedrati (2018) estimates that the number of Mandaeans remaining in Iraq and Iran is around 3,000.

=== Distribution ===
There are active Mandaean associations in Stockholm Municipality (including in Vällingby), Malmö, Södertälje, Lund, Örebro, Sandviken, Eskilstuna, Landskrona, and Västerås, as well as in Ytterby and Osby.

== See also ==
- Assyrians/Syriacs in Sweden
- Swedish Iraqis
- Mandaean Australians
- Mandaean Americans
- Mandaeans in Iraq (Arabic Wikipedia)
