= Assyrians in Sweden =

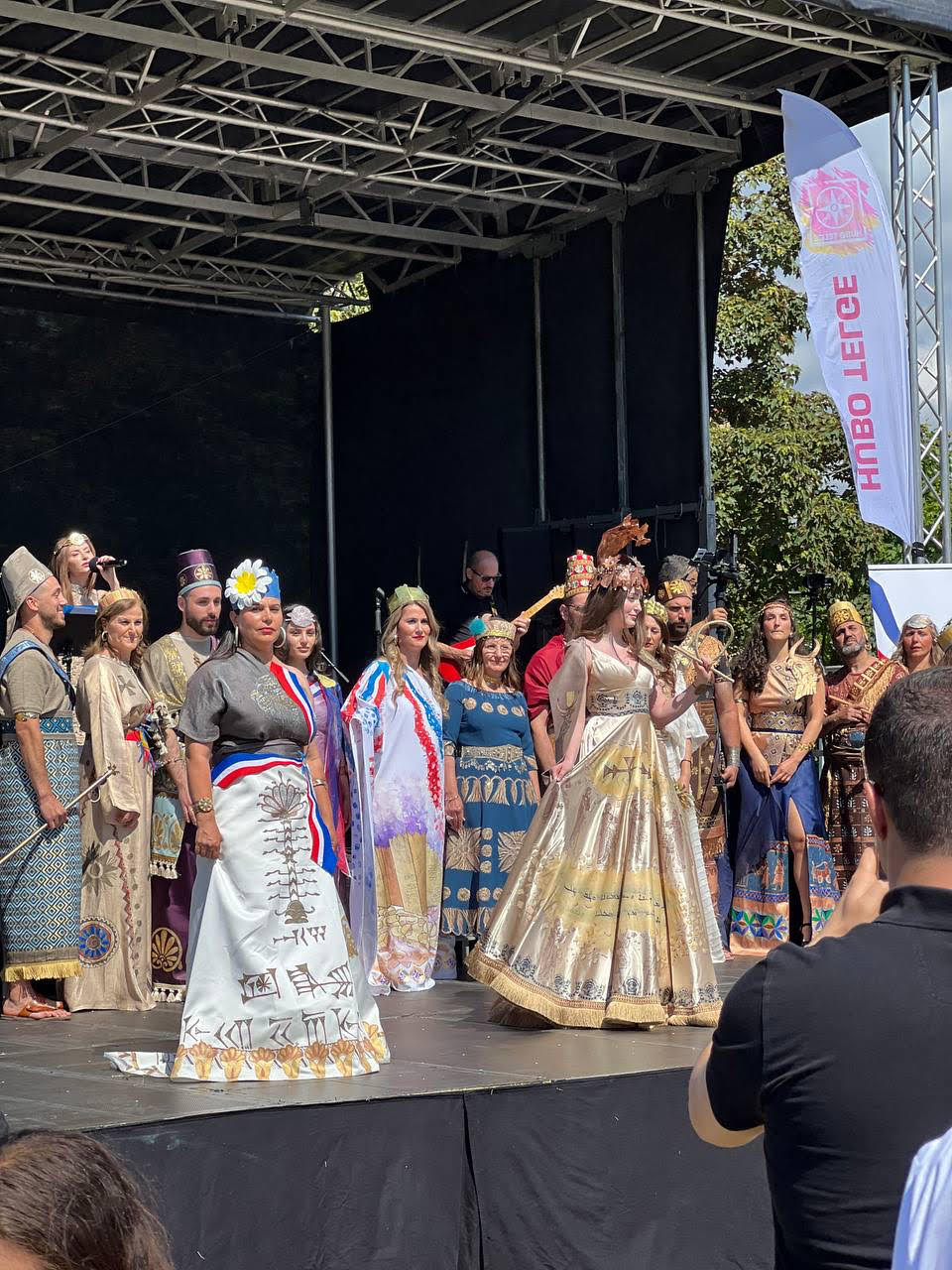
- Swedish Assyrians in cultural clothing in 2024

Total population
- 150,000–200,000

Regions with significant populations
- Södertälje, Stockholm, Gothenburg, Örebro, Västerås, Norrköping, Linköping, Skövde, Jönköping, Tibro

Languages
- Neo-Aramaic · Swedish

Religion
- Predominantly Christianity (majority: Syriac Christianity; minority: Protestantism)

Assyrians in Sweden (Swedish: Assyrier i Sverige), or Swedish Assyrians, are Assyrians or people of Assyrian descent living in Sweden. Between 2018 and 2020, it was estimated that approximately 150,000 to 200,000 Assyrians were living in Sweden.

Assyrians first came to Sweden from Syria for work in the late 1960s when Europe needed laborers for its industries. However, with increased ethnic and religious persecution in their homeland, which is located in present-day southeastern Turkey, northern Iraq, northwestern Iran and northeastern Syria, Assyrian immigration to Sweden increased. Those who had lived in Sweden for a longer period of time were granted residency for humanitarian reasons, given the conflicts in their place of origin.

== History ==
=== Early immigration (1960s-1970s) ===
In the 1960s, it became increasingly unsafe for Assyrians in Midyat, the regional centre of Tur Abdin. Muslims incited violent anti-Christian protests as a response to events unfolding in Cyprus. This led to many Assyro-Syriacs not seeing a future for themselves in their ancestral homeland.

On Thursday 9 March 1967, 108 stateless Assyrians left Beirut airport in Lebanon en route to Sweden where they landed at Bulltofta airport outside of Malmö. After being bathed upon arrival, the Assyrians were transported by bus to a refugee housing complex in Alvesta in the province of Småland. Over a month later on Thursday, 13 April, a second group of 98 Assyrian refugees arrived from Beirut. The reason behind the initial immigration of Assyrians to Sweden was the introduction of a quota of 200 Christians from Lebanon that were to be accepted by the Swedish Public Employment Service after coordination with the World Council of Churches and the United Nation High Commissioner for Refugees. A group of Swedish public officials visited Beirut where a selection of mostly young families from Turkey that were members of the Syriac Orthodox Church, as well as Protestants and members of the Assyrian Church of the East were accepted to immigrate to Sweden.

Assyrians of Södertälje were involved in a riot on 19 June 1977, when raggare (greasers), mainly coming from nearby Stockholm attacked them at Restaurant Bristol in Södertälje, at the time the attack being believed that it was racially motivated. This was part of the raggare-scare that existed during those times. Mass media added fuel to the riots with headlines about "race riots" and "Södertälje - a city gripped by fear". It was said that the greasers' aversion towards the Assyrians was because the latter taking up too much space, talking loudly, walking around well-dressed and wearing gold chains. There were also rumours about the Assyrians taking over the city.

== Demographics ==
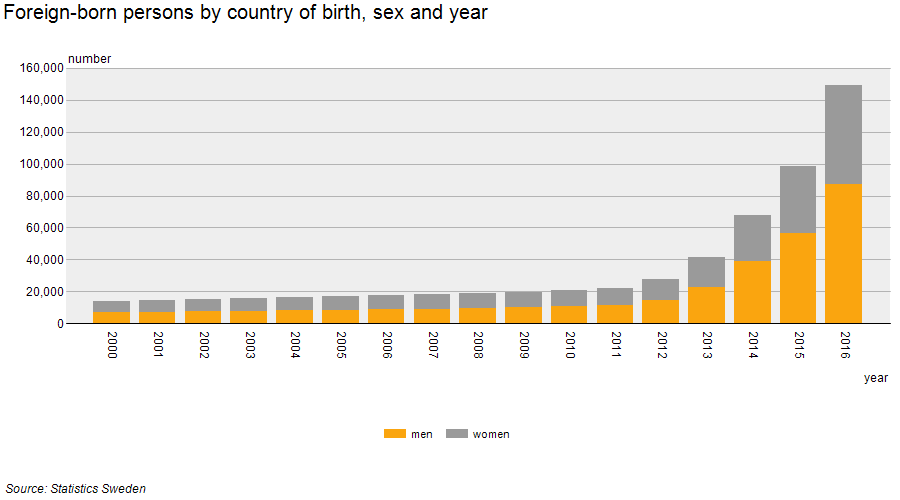
Syria-born persons in Sweden by sex, 2000-2016 (Statistics Sweden).

Södertälje is seen as the unofficial Assyrian capital of Europe due to the city's high percentage of Assyrians. According to Assyrian organization estimates, there are approximately 150,000 Assyrians in Sweden. The Syriac Orthodox Christians number an estimated 30,000–40,000 people (2016), while higher estimations is 70–80,000, out of which an estimated 18,000 live in Södertälje.

According to Statistics Sweden, as of 2016, there 22,663 are citizens of Iraq (12,705 men, 9,958 women) and 116,384 citizens of Syria (70,060 men, 46,324 women) residing in Sweden.

== Culture ==
=== Identity ===
There is an ideological division of this group in Sweden between

- Assyrier: Mostly adherents of the Syriac Orthodox Church, Assyrian Church of the East, Chaldean Catholic Church and various Protestant churches, hailing from south eastern Turkey, north eastern Syria, northern Iraq, western Iran and Lebanon, who de-emphasize religious adherence in favour of ethnicity pre-Christian antiquity, who insist on the name Assyrier, with an Assyrian-Mesopotamian heritage and Assyrian identity for the group.
- Syrianer: Largely adherents of the Syriac Orthodox Church hailing from Lebanon, northeastern Syria and southeastern Turkey, who insist on the name Syrianer, and often an "Aramean" heritage for the group.

To account for this division, official Swedish sources refer to the group as "Assyrier/Syrianer", with a slash (similar to the US census, which opted for "Assyrian/Chaldean/Syriac").

== Organisations ==
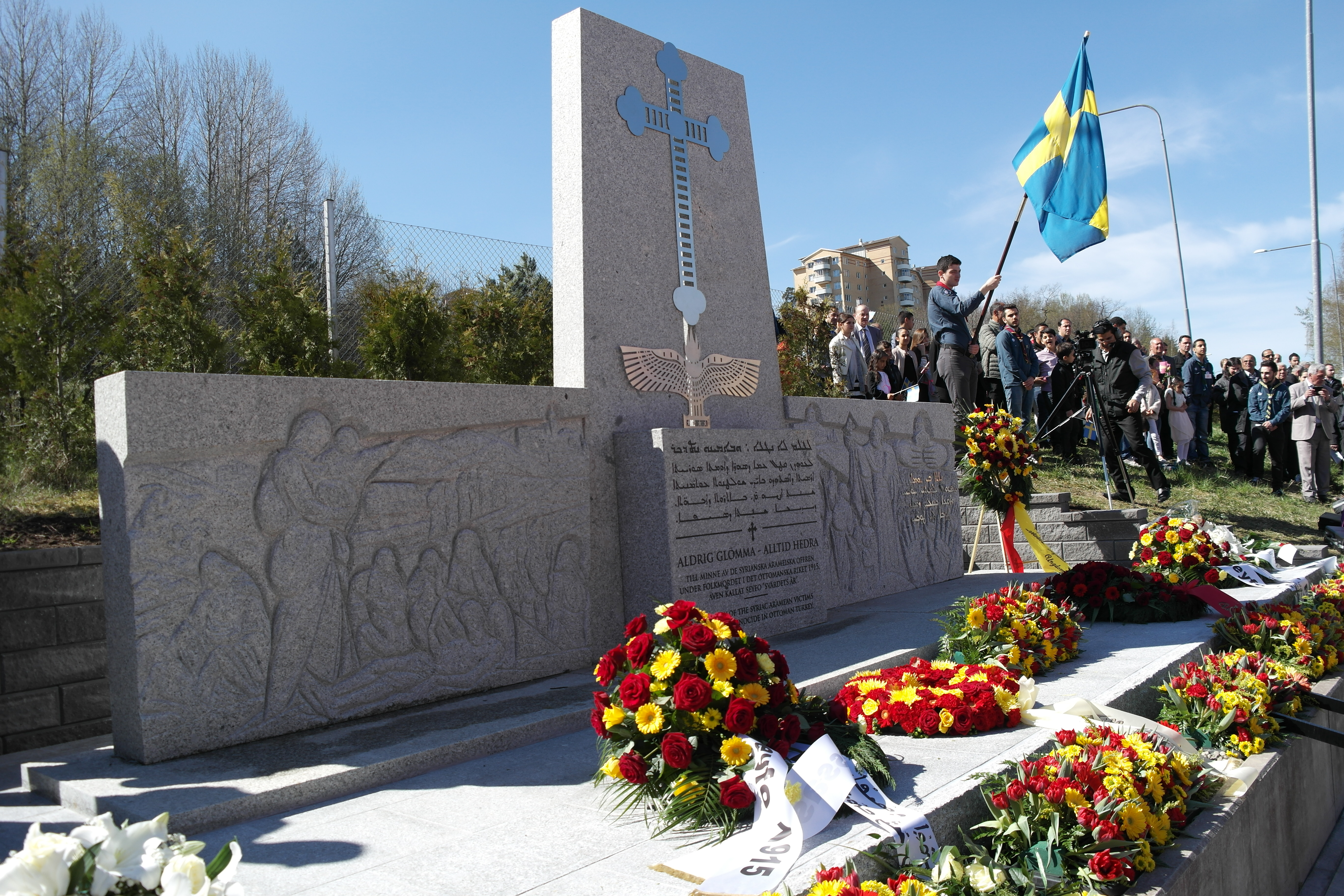
A monument for the Assyrian genocide in Hallunda, Botkyrka, Stockholm County.

When Assyrians immigrated to Sweden, they formed cultural organisations that would represent their people, as well as act as a centre for Assyrians in Sweden to meet. The Assyrian Federation of Sweden (AFS) was founded in 1977 as a nationwide umbrella organisation for the various local associations in Sweden. The formation took place on 15–17 April 1977, with twenty-one representatives from eleven associations present, unanimously deciding to unite into a national organisation. At the national assembly in 1983, 44 representatives from 21 associations were present. Initially, the Federation had 3,000 members which soon doubled by 1980. At first, the Federation's office was located in Norsborg, but soon moved to Södertälje in 1983.

Aside from the Assyrian Federation of Sweden, the Assyrian Youth Federation and Assyrian Women's Federation existed nationwide. The Youth Federation was formed in 1985 as the Assyrian Youth Committee within the AFS. In 1991, it was transformed into the Assyrian Youth Federation, and became more independent from the AFS.

The Syriac (Aramean) Federation of Sweden was founded in 1978. The federation is safeguarding the interest in the linguistic, cultural, ethnic, and social issues of the Aramean people. The federation has about 19.000 members and 34 sub-associations. The federation is collaborating with numerous organizations in Sweden that provides assistants needed for the federation and its operations.

== Media ==
=== Publications ===
In 1978, Hujådå, the first Assyrian magazine was published by the Assyrian Federation of Sweden. The etymology of the name has the meaning "unity" or "union" in the Aramaic language, with the intention to unite all Assyrians, regardless of church, and to pay homage to Naum Faiq's publication with the same name in the United States in the early 1920s. The first issue of Hujådå came out in spring of 1978 and was published by Gabriel Afram, the then chairman of AFS, and the editor in-chief, Johanon Kashisho. In the beginning, the magazine contained material in four languages: Aramaic, Arabic, Turkish and Swedish. Eventually, material was published in English. Currently, Hujådå only exists as a web publication.

The second Aramean magazine was published by the Aramean Federation of Sweden called Bahro Suryoyo. It is published in five languages: Swedish, Aramaic, Arabic, English, and Turkish. It is available as an online magazine since 2009 at bahro.nu.

=== Television ===
In the mid-2000s, Assyrian TV channels were formed in Södertälje. Suroyo TV is operated by the Dawronoye political movement, while the Syriacs identifying as "Aramean" created Suryoyo Sat. The AFS, Women's Federation and Youth Federation founded the Assyrian Media Institute (AMI) on 24 September 2011, in Norrköping. AMI owns and operates Assyria TV, a web TV channel, which broadcasts shows worldwide, commonly interviewing famous Assyrians, as well as famous Swedish politicians and scholars. Assyria TV has also played a role in exposing Kurdish acts of cruelty against Assyrians in Iraq and Syria.

== Religion ==
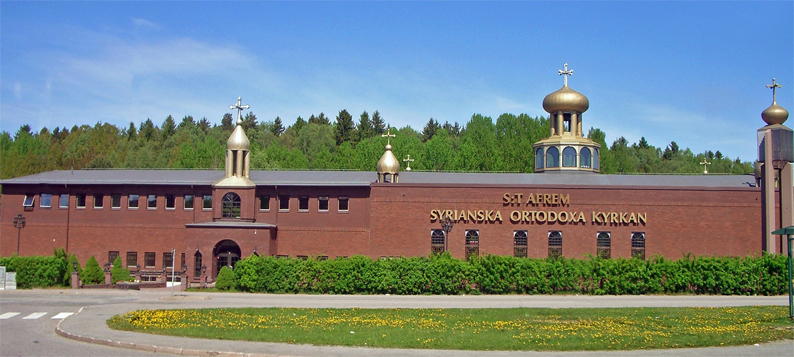
Mor Afrem Cathedral in Södertälje.

In the 1990s, the Syriac Orthodox Church in Sweden fell into disunion with the church's board shutting the bishop out and demanding that the Patriarch in Damascus appoint a new bishop. In 1996, a new bishop was appointed, resulting in the Syriac Orthodox Church in Sweden being divided into two separate dioceses with their own bishops, both based in Södertälje. The diocese which does not reject the Assyrian name is led from St. Jacob of Nisibi's Cathedral in Hosvjö. The other diocese is led from St. Afrem's Church in Geneta.

== Sport ==
Assyrians have a wide spanning history in relation to sports in Sweden, most notably in the football arena. In Qamishli and Tur Abdin, Assyrians had their own football clubs that played at a local or national level. This led to the formation of ethnic-based Assyrian clubs in Sweden who have enjoyed a high level of success relative to other ethnic groups. Currently, there are over 20 Assyrian ethnic-based clubs present across Sweden.

On 14 February 1974, Assyriska FF was established in Södertälje. In the year 2000, Assyriska FF joined the Superettan when it was founded and boast the most seasons in the competition at 15. In 2003, Assyriska FF qualified for the Swedish Cup Final, before falling short to Elfsborg 0–2 in the final. In 2005, Assyriska FF managed to reach the highest level of football in Sweden, the Allsvenskan, becoming the first ethnic club to reach the competition. Their first game of the season was played on 12 April at Råsunda Stadium against Hammarby where Assyrian-American singer Linda George performed in front of an audience of 15,000.

In 1977 the club Syrianska FC was also established in Södertalje. In 2010, after two years in Superettan, Syrianska was promoted to Allsvenskan (the highest tier in Swedish football) for the first time in club history. 3 years later in 1980 another club was found Arameisk-Syrianska IF playing in the third highest Swedish league, Division 1.

== Notable people ==
- Abgar Barsom, former footballer.
- Nuri Kino, journalist
- Bishara Morad, known by the mononym Bishara, singer from Syria born 2003, took part in Melodifestivalen 2019.
- Daniel Teymur, MMA fighter.
- David Durmaz, footballer, family from southeastern Turkey.
- Ibrahim Baylan, politician, born and raised in Deir Salih, Tur Abdin, Turkey.
- Jimmy Durmaz, footballer, father from Midyat in Turkey.
- Kennedy Bakircioglu, footballer, family arrived in 1972 from Midyat.
- Mikael Ishak, footballer, from Södertälje.
- Sharbel Touma, footballer, born in Lebanon.
- Suleyman Sleyman, footballer.
- Yilmaz Kerimo, politician, born in Turkey.
- Antonio Yakoub, Swedish-born footballer of Assyrian and Finnish descent

== See also ==
- Mandaeans in Sweden
- Swedish Iranians
- Swedish Iraqis
- Kurds in Sweden
- Lebanese people in Sweden
- Syrians in Sweden
- Turks in Sweden
