= Arabs in Sweden =

Swedish Arabs السويديون العرب
Total population
- 543,350 (People from Arab league nations according to the Statistics Sweden)

Regions with significant populations
- Stockholm, Södertälje, Malmö

Languages
- Arabic • Swedish

Religion
- Islam • Christianity

Related ethnic groups
- Arab diaspora

Arabs in Sweden are citizens and residents of Sweden who emigrated from nations in the Arab world or were born in Sweden to Arab immigrant parents. They represent 5.3% of the total population of the country. About a quarter of Arabs in Sweden are Christians.

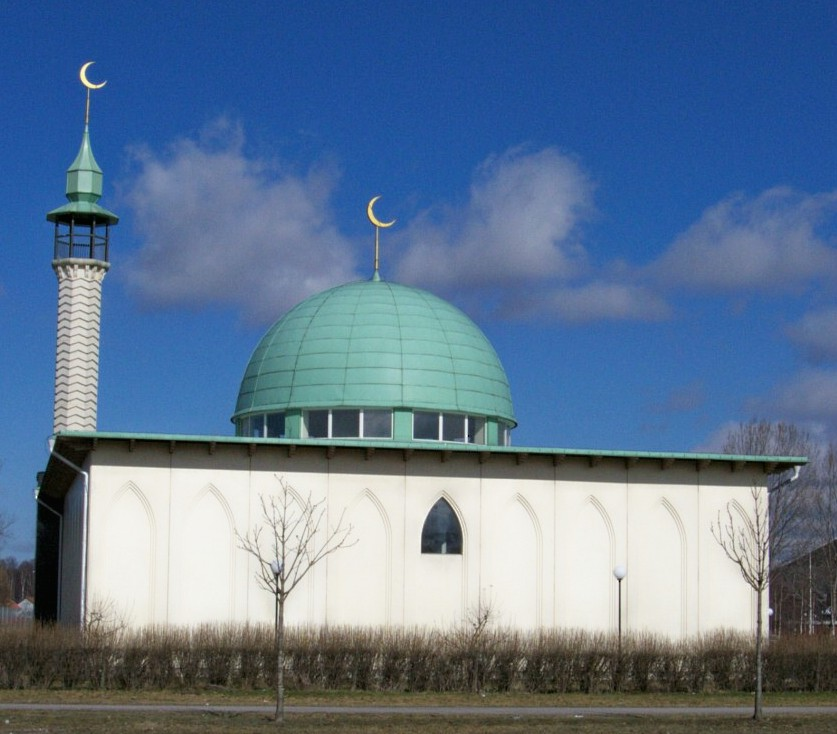
Uppsala Mosque in Uppland, Uppsala. It was founded in 1995.

== Migration history ==
Many of the Arabs in Sweden are migrants from Syria, Iraq, Kurdistan, Lebanon, Morocco, Palestine, Egypt, Tunisia, Algeria and Saudi Arabia.

In September 2013, Swedish migration authorities ruled that all Syrian asylum seekers will be granted permanent residency in light of the worsening conflict in Syria. Sweden is the first EU-country to make this offer. The decision means that the roughly 8,000 Syrians who have temporary residency in Sweden will now be able to stay in the country permanently. They will also have the right to bring their families to Sweden. While Malek Laesker, vice-chair of the Syrian Arabian Cultural Association of Sweden, welcomed the decision, he also warned it could create issues. "The fact that Sweden is the first country to open its arms is both positive and negative," he told the TT news agency, explaining that it may be a boon for the growing people-smuggling market.

== Notable people ==
=== Film, television and acting ===
- Malik Bendjelloul, filmmaker of Algerian descent
- Mohamed Said (actor), actor of Iraqi origin
- Tarik Saleh, film director of Egyptian descent
- Said Legue, actor and script writer of Moroccan origin

=== Musicians ===
- Salem Al Fakir, Grammy Award-winning singer of Syrian origin
- Rabih Jaber, singer of Lebanese origin, also part of Rebound! with Eddie Razaz
- Josef Johansson, pop singer of Tunisian origin
- Leila K, singer and rapper of Moroccan descent
- Loreen, singer of Moroccan-Berber descent
- Maher Zain, singer and songwriter of Lebanese origin
- RedOne, songwriter and music producer of Moroccan origin
- Rami Yacoub, songwriter and music producer of Palestinian origin

=== Sports ===
- Nabil Bahoui, footballer of Moroccan origin
- Nadir Benchenaa, footballer of Algerian origin
- Dalil Benyahia, footballer of Algerian descent
- Louay Chanko, footballer of Syrian origin
- Jimmy Durmaz, footballer of Syrian-Turkish origin
- Seif Kadhim, footballer of Iraqi origin
- Oliver Kass Kawo, footballer of Syrian origin
- Mohammed Ali Khan, footballer of Lebanese origin
- George Moussan, footballer of Syrian origin
- Christer Youssef, footballer of Syrian origin
- Gabriel Ozkan

=== Others ===
- Modhir Ahmed, visual artist of Iraqi origin
- Mahmoud Aldebe, of the Muslim association of Jordanian descent
- Nadia Jebril, journalist and television presenter of Palestinian origin
- Osama Krayem, suspected terrorist of Syrian origin
- Fida al-Sayed, political activist of Syrian descent

== See also ==
- Arab diaspora
- Arabs in Europe
- Islam in Sweden
- Iranians in Sweden
- Moroccans in Sweden
- Iraqis in Sweden
- Kurds in Sweden
- Lebanese people in Sweden
- Syrians in Sweden
- Immigration to Sweden

== External source ==
- Dialogue and openness - Sweden in the UN Security Council
