= Swedish Iraqis =

Swedish Iraqis Svenskirakier العراقيون السويديون
Total population
- 145,586 (born in Iraq); 91,119 (at least one parent born in Iraq)

Regions with significant populations
- Primarily in Stockholm, Södertälje and Malmö

Languages
- Swedish and Mesopotamian Arabic also Kurdish (Sorani and Kurmanji dialects), Turkish (Iraqi Turkmen/Turkoman dialects), and Neo-Aramaic (Assyrian and Mandaic)

Religion
- Mainly Sunni Islam, Minority Shia Islam Syriac Christianity, Mandaeism (Sweden has one of the biggest Mandaean communities in the world.)

Related ethnic groups
- Iraqi diaspora

Iraqis are the second largest minority group living in Sweden after Syrians, with 145,586 Iraqi-born people living in Sweden and 91,119 Swedes with at least one Iraqi-born parent. They are also one of the largest Asian communities in the country. The size of this group has doubled in the period of 2002 to 2009; the influx of Iraqi refugees increased dramatically from 2006 to 2009 as a result of the US-led invasion of Iraq.

== Population ==
Iraq-born people are the third largest minority group living in Sweden, after the Sweden Finns (5.1%) and the Syrians (2.4%). They are also one of the largest Asian communities in Sweden.

Sweden also has Europe's largest community of Iraqi Mandaeans.

== Migration history ==
Iraqi immigrants to Sweden have come in four distinct waves of migration. In the first wave (1968–1978), around 8,000 Kurdish and Assyrian nationalists and Iraqi communists were escaping the Baathist regime. The second wave (1980–1988) of 10,000 people was mainly Kurds and Assyrians escaping the Al-Anfal Campaign and Iraqi men escaping forced conscription in the Iran–Iraq War. The third wave (1991–1999) was about 15,000 people, again mostly Kurdish and Assyrian people from Northern Iraq; most came with families. The largest numbers, almost 30,000 people, of Iraqis in Sweden today have migrated as a consequence of the Iraq War of 2003 to 2010; most are Sunni Arabs and Assyrian Christians.

Christian Iraqis, fearing persecution in their homeland, made up a large part of that influx after Iraq occupation in 2003. Sweden accepted more than half of all asylum applications from Iraqis in Europe. In 2006, over 9,000 Iraqis fled their country and came to Sweden seeking shelter, a fourfold increase over 2005. In 2007, Sweden attempted to throttle the influx of Iraqi refugees by tightening the rules for asylum seekers, but in 2008 there were again record numbers of Iraqi immigrants, close to 12,000. In 2009, the number of immigrants fell again slightly, to 8,400.

Iraqi-born persons in Sweden by year:

2000	2001	2002	2003	2004	2005	2006	2007	2008	2009	2010	2011	2012	2013	2014	2015	2016
49,372	55,696	62,751	67,645	70,117	72,553	82,827	97,513	109,446	117,919	121,761	125,499	127,860	128,946	130,178	131,888	135,129

== Refugee status and naturalization ==
In 2006 Sweden granted protection status to more Iraqis than in all other EU states combined. In 2005 only 0.1 percent of Iraqis were recognised as refugees, but the total recognition rate including those granted complementary protection was a relatively high 24 per cent. In the year 2006 however, recognition rates leapt to a total of 91 per cent.

The Swedish Migration Board decided in early 2006 that all Iraqi asylum-seekers from Central and Southern Iraq whose claims had been rejected as part of the normal status determination process would nevertheless receive a permanent residence permit, allowing the majority of Iraqis in Sweden to begin the process of fully integrating into Swedish society with a secure legal status.

In the context of the generally low recognition rates for Iraqis in other EU states, Sweden's generosity led to a surge in the number of applications received from Iraqis. Figures increased from 2,330 in 2005 to 8,951 the following year, with a further 1,500 new arrivals per month in the first half of 2007. Most of these persons have joined the existing Iraqi community in Sweden in municipalities such as Malmö and Södertälje, with the scale of the influx to these areas forcing newcomers to live in very poor conditions. Speaking in June 2007, Södertälje's mayor Anders Lago described the situation as being close to breaking point, with the authorities barely able to provide basic services and many newcomers sharing apartments with up to fifteen people.

== Notable people ==
- Aimar Sher, footballer
- Darin, singer
- Elaf Ali, journalist and author
- Peter Gwargis, footballer
- Mohanad Jeahze, footballer
- Kevin Yakob, footballer
- Bovar Karim, footballer
- Ahmed Yasin, footballer
- Mohamed Said, actor
- Salam Karam, journalist
- Rosa Kafaji, footballer
- Modhir Ahmed, visual artist
- Abir Al-Sahlani, politician
- Hayv Kahraman, artist and painter
- Lina Ishaq, Islamic State of Iraq and the Levant member

== See also ==
- Demographics of Sweden
- Asian immigrants to Sweden
- Arabs in Sweden
- Islam in Sweden
- Kurds in Sweden
- Immigration to Sweden
- Iraqi refugees
- Assyrians/Syriacs in Sweden
- Mandaeans in Sweden
- List of Iraqis
- Iraq–Sweden relations
- Iraqis in Finland
