= Wallacia Mandi =

Mandaean temple in Wallacia, New South Wales, Australia

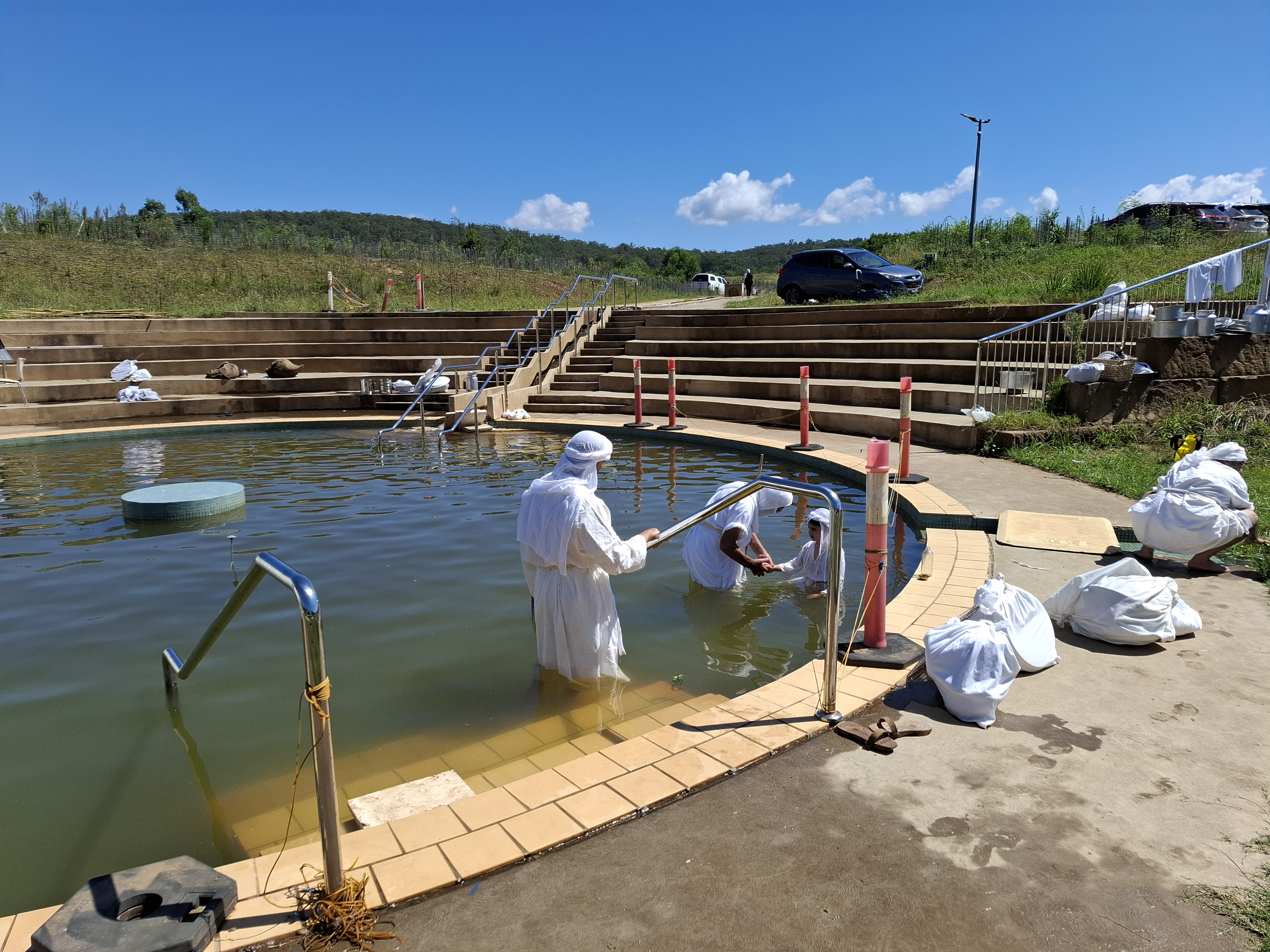
- Mandaeans performing masbuta at Wallacia Mandi during Parwanaya 2025

Religion
- Affiliation: Mandaeism
- Governing body: Sabian Mandaean Association in Australia
- Leadership: Rishama Salah Choheili

Location
- Location: Wallacia
- Municipality: Penrith
- State: New South Wales
- Country: Australia
- Interactive map of Wallacia Mandi
- Coordinates: 33.8711°S 150.6384°E

Wallacia Mandi (also known as Mandi Wallacia or Mendi Wallacia; Arabic: مندي وليشيا) is a Mandaean temple (mandi) under construction in Wallacia, New South Wales, Australia. The mandi is located on the west bank of the Nepean River. It is the only mandi in Australia located on the banks of a natural river (yardna in Mandaic), a traditional requirement for Mandaean rituals.

The Mandaean community in Sydney is currently raising funds for Wallacia Mandi through crowdfunding via GoFundMe.

== Infrastructure ==
As of 2024, two outdoor baptismal pools (including a large main pool for masbuta and a smaller pool for ablutions), a washroom (for changing into ritual clothing), and a parking lot have been built and are already operational, and thousands of trees have also been planted. A congregation hall, guesthouse, playground, and gardens are being planned. Water for the mandi's baptismal pool is pumped in from the Nepean River, since flowing river water is traditionally required for Mandaean rituals.

A shkinta (ritual mud hut) is located on another Mandaean-owned property adjacent to Wallacia Mandi.

== Administration ==
Rishama Salah Choheili currently serves as the head priest of the mandi. The mandi is affiliated with Ganzibra Dakhil Mandi and the Sabian Mandaean Association in Australia. Since flowing river water is traditionally required for Mandaean baptisms, Ganzibra Dakhil Mandi congregation members go to Wallacia Mandi for baptisms, while Ganzibra Dakhil Mandi is used for sermons and meetings that do not include baptismal rituals.

== Gallery ==
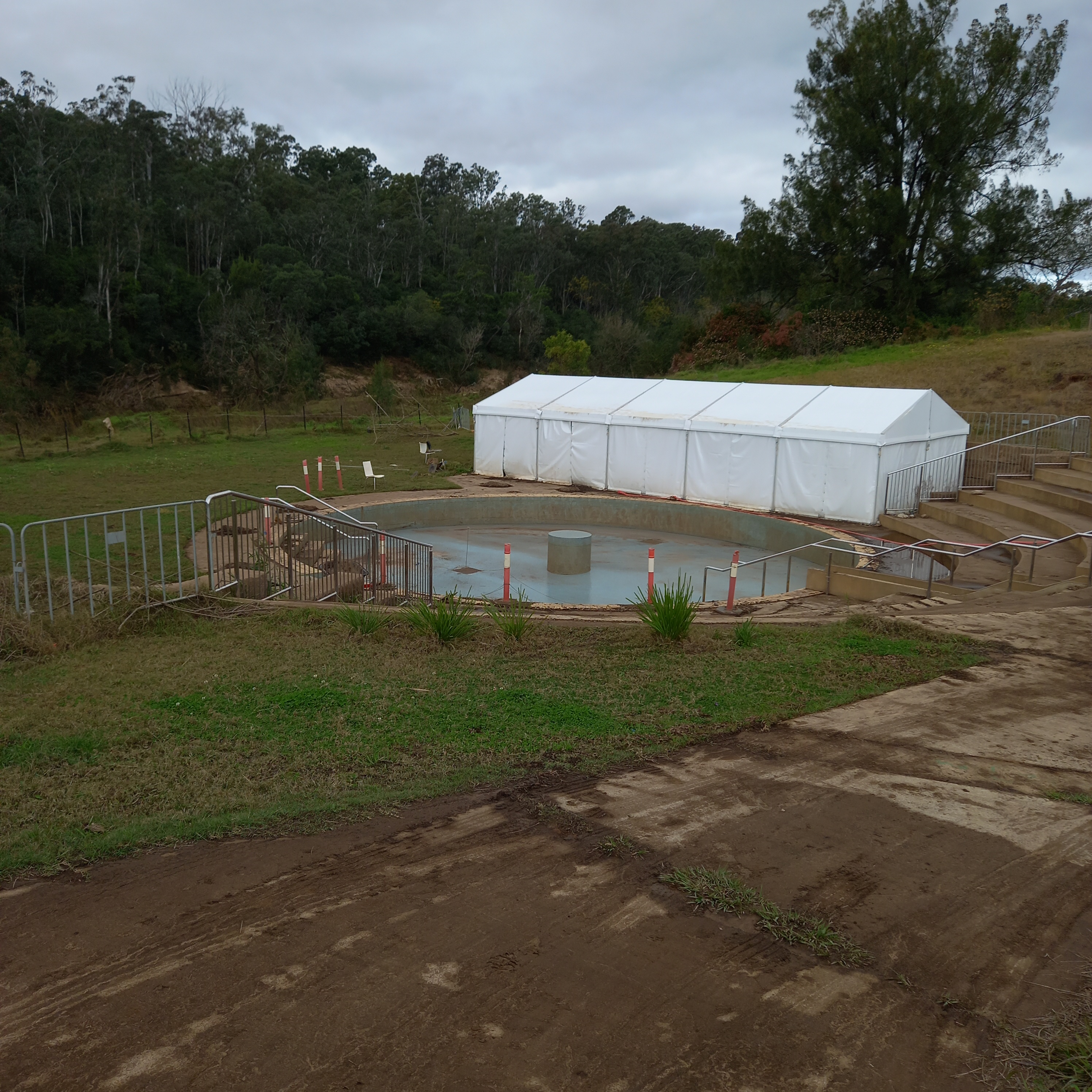
View of Wallacia Mandi's main baptismal pool, located adjacent to the Nepean River (in the background), in June 2024

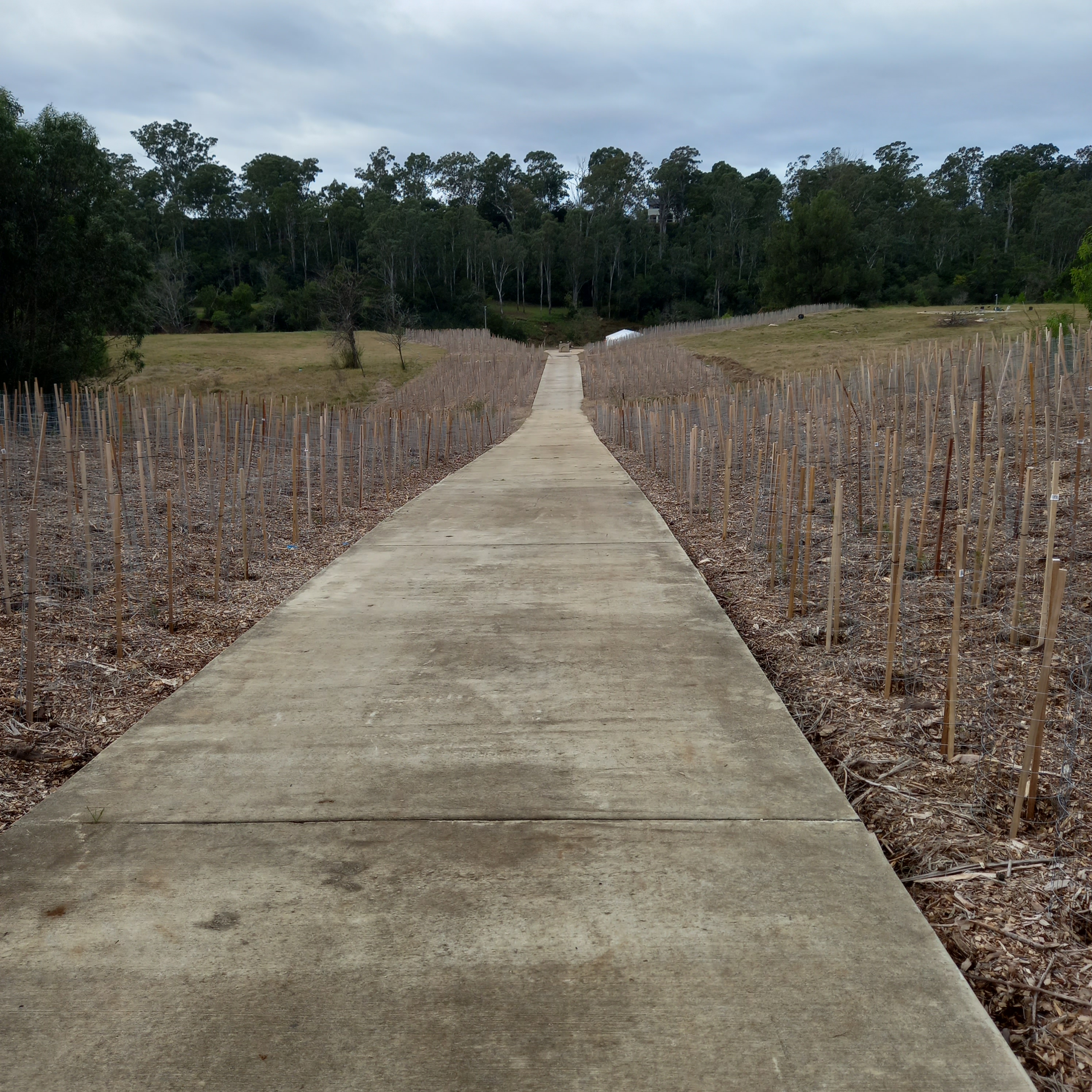
Paved concrete road leading to the baptismal pools

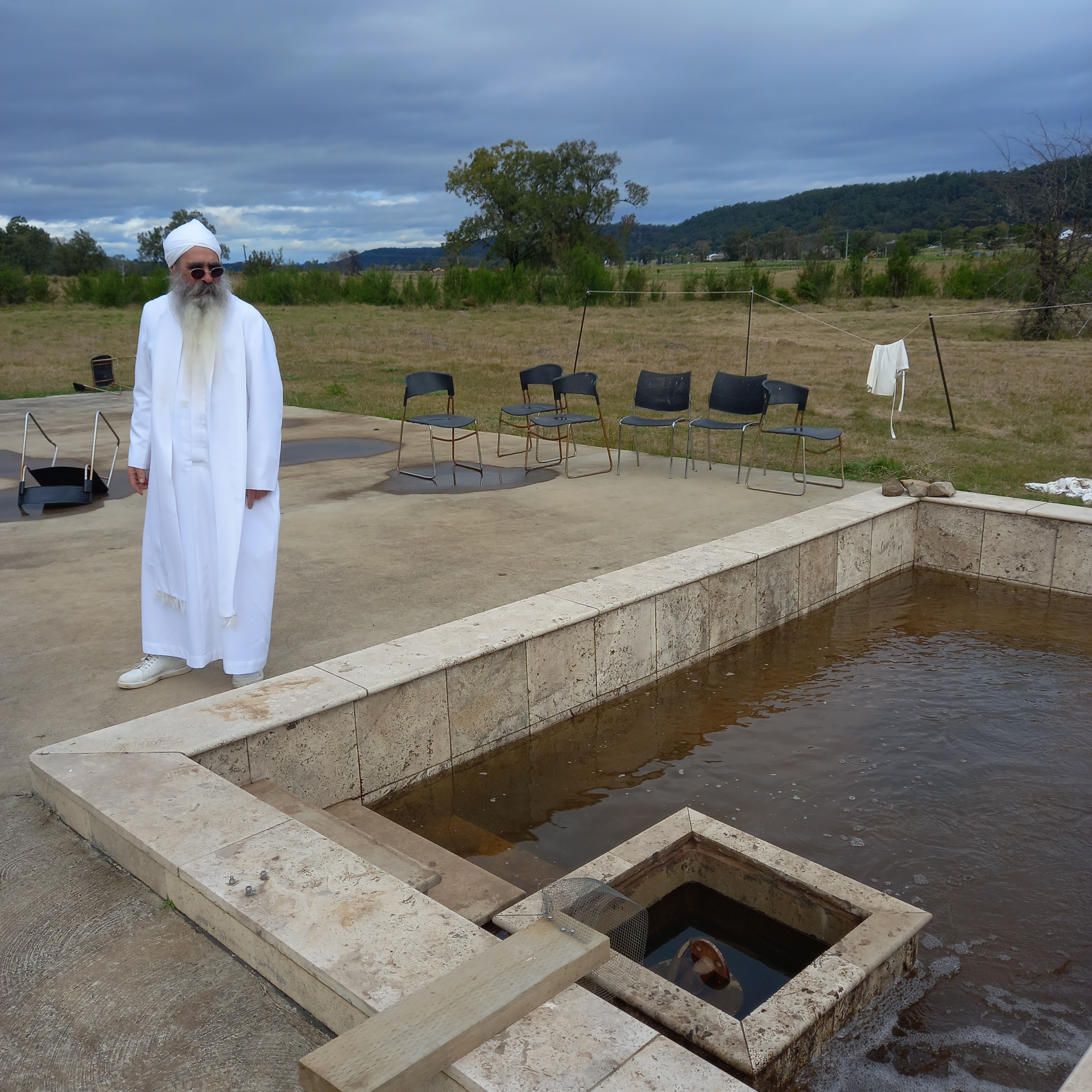
Rishama Salah Choheili inspecting the minor baptismal pool

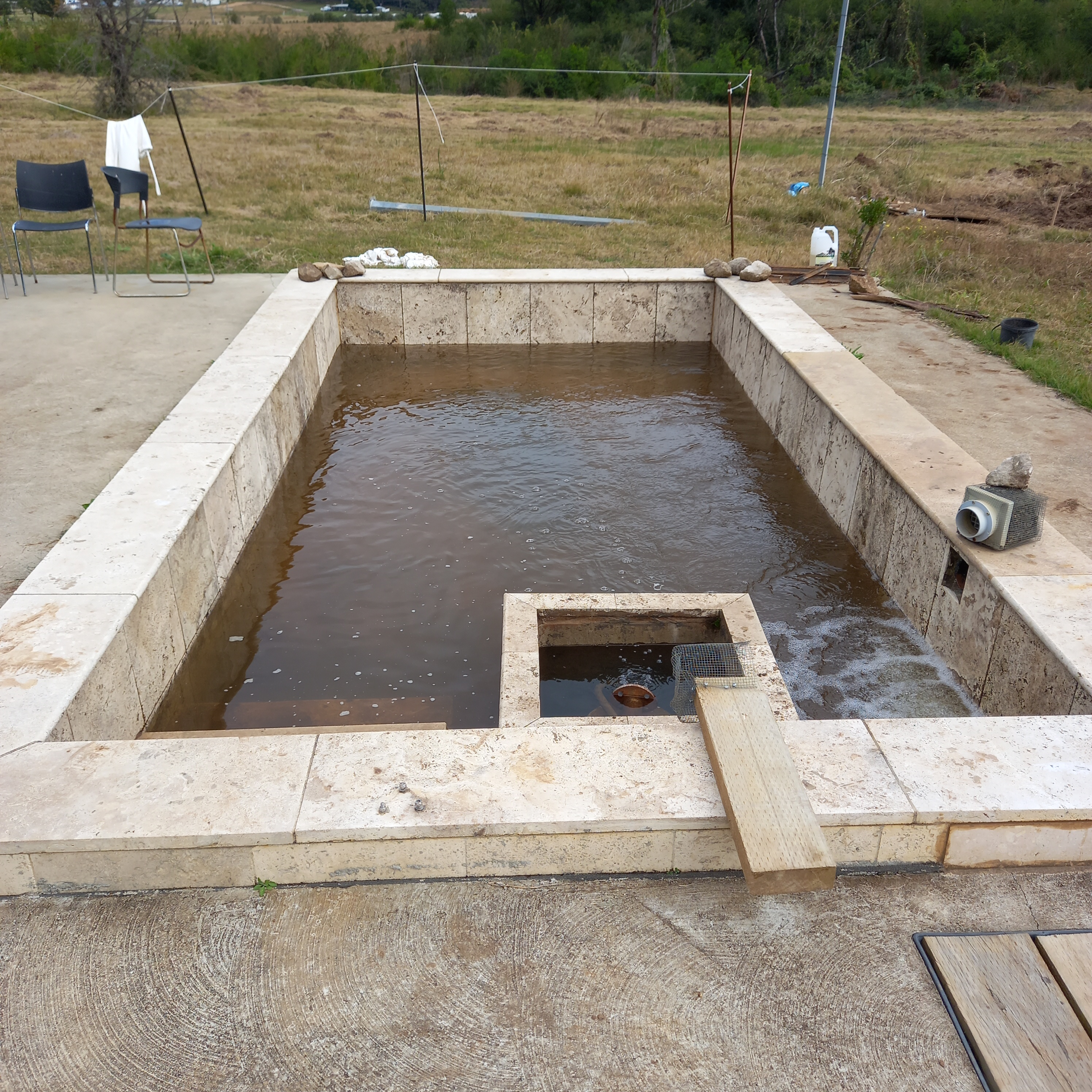
The minor baptismal pool

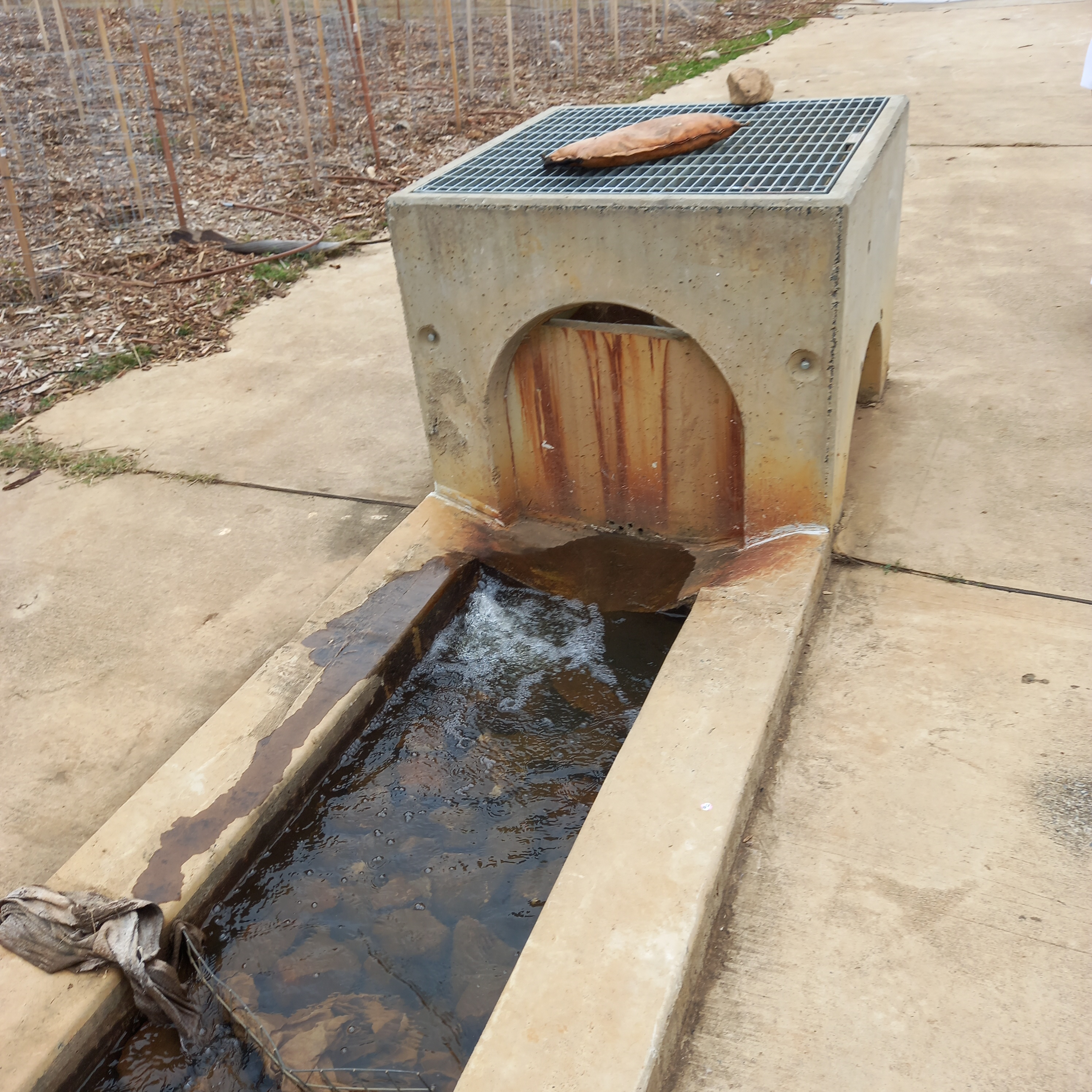
Water being pumped from the Nepean River into the main baptismal pool

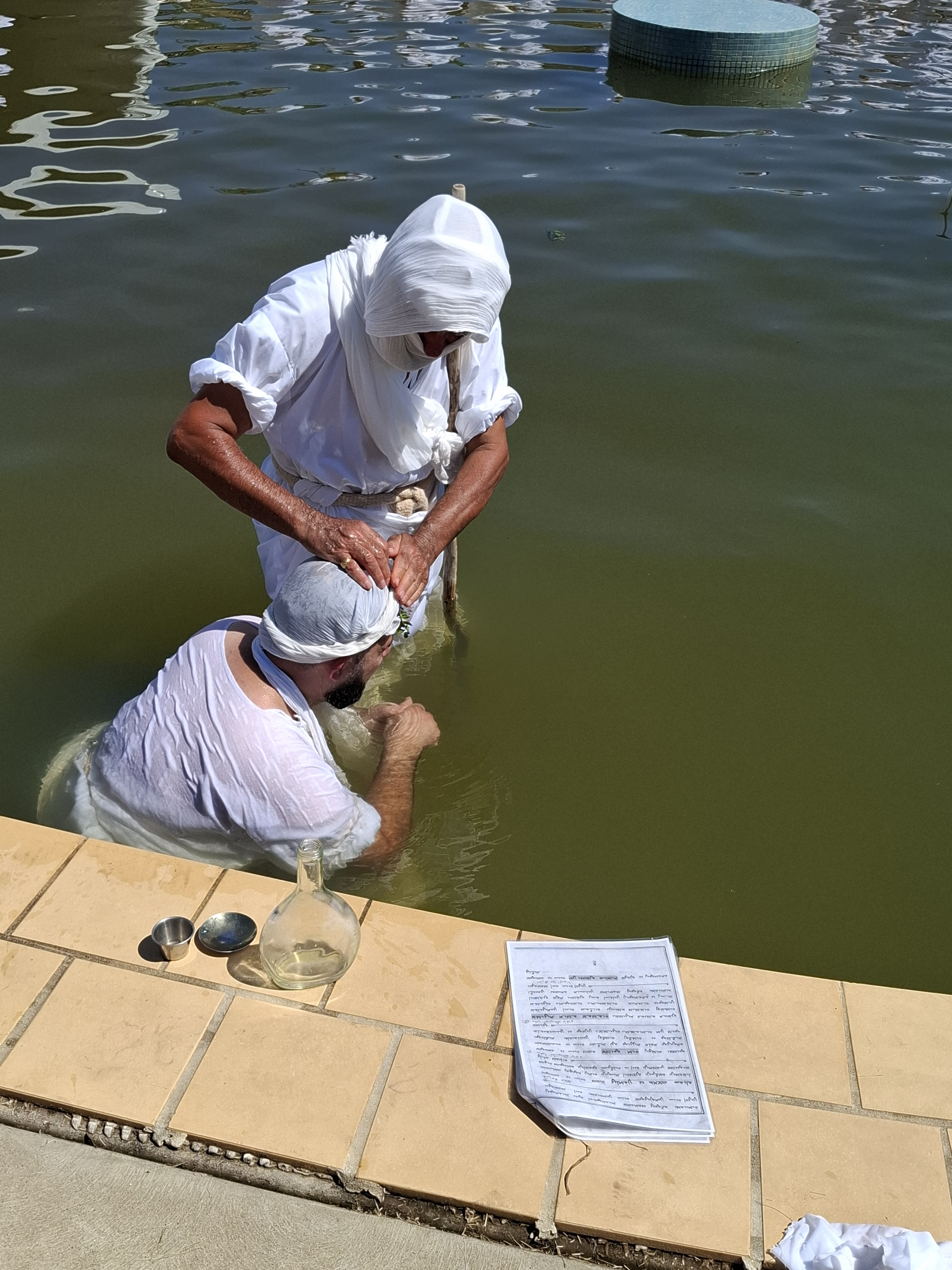
Rishama Salah Choheili performing masbuta for a Mandaean at Wallacia Mandi during Parwanaya 2025

== See also ==
- Ganzibra Dakhil Mandi
- Mandaean Australians
