= Moroccans in Sweden =

Total population
- 11,530 (2019)

Regions with significant populations
- Stockholm, Gothenburg, Malmö

Languages
- Moroccan Arabic, Berber languages, Swedish

Religion
- Predominantly Islam

Related ethnic groups
- Moroccan diaspora

Moroccans in Sweden are citizens and residents of Sweden who are of Moroccan descent.

== Demographics ==
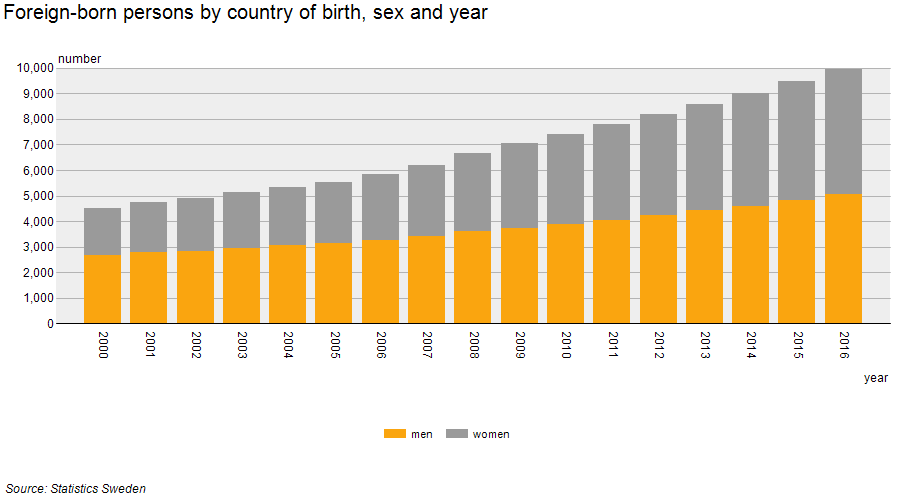
Morocco-born persons in Sweden by sex, 2000-2016 (Statistics Sweden).

According to Statistics Sweden, as of 2019, there are a total 11,530 Morocco-born immigrants living in Sweden. There are 3,742 citizens of Morocco (1,912 men, 1,830 women), not including those who also have Swedish citizenship. As of 2016, 429 Moroccan citizens (361 men, 68 women) residing in Sweden are registered as asylum seekers. Among these individuals are 144 Moroccan children out of a total 2,199 unaccompanied refugee minors residing in Sweden. In 2016, the governments of Morocco and Sweden signed a treaty to facilitate the children's repatriation to Morocco. According to Statistics Sweden, in 2016, there were 64 registered emigrations from Sweden to Morocco.

== Refugees ==
In May 2017 border police reported that false identities were common among Moroccan asylum seekers. Police in Sweden were able to verify the identities of 77 migrants from Morocco using fingerprint matches checked against the Moroccan fingerprint database. It was found that out of the 77, 65 had lied about their identity and of the 50 claiming to be underage, all but two were adult.

== Repatriation ==
Of the estimated 800 street children in Sweden, Morocco is the most prevalent country of origin. While Morocco earlier refused to receive the youth, in 2016 the governments of Sweden and Morocco signed a treaty to facilitate their repatriation by using the Moroccan fingerprint register to aid the Swedish Migration Agency in identifying them. Of those who claimed to be under 18 years of age, this was incorrect in 90% of the cases. After the treaty, coordination by authorities in the two countries led to 271 being leaving Sweden during 2016. According to statistics by the Swedish Prison and Probation Service, 135 individuals were repatriated to Morocco in 2017.

== Education ==
As of 2016, according to Statistics Sweden, 26% of Morocco-born individuals aged 25 to 64 have attained a primary and lower secondary education level (23% men, 29% women), 35% have attained an upper secondary education level (37% men, 33% women), 19% have attained a post-secondary education level of less than 3 years (21% men, 17% women), 15% have attained a post-secondary education of 3 years or more (15% men, 15% women), and 6% have attained an unknown education level (5% men, 7% women).

== Notable people ==
- Loreen, singer
- Leila K, singer
- Kenza Zouiten, fashion model and blogger
- RedOne, producer and songwriter
- Said Legue, actor
- Nabil Bahoui, footballer
- Amin Affane, footballer
- Sofia Karlberg, singer

== See also ==
- Arabs in Sweden
- Moroccan diaspora
- Immigration to Sweden
