= Ganzibra Dakhil Mandi =

Mandaean temple in Liverpool, New South Wales, Australia

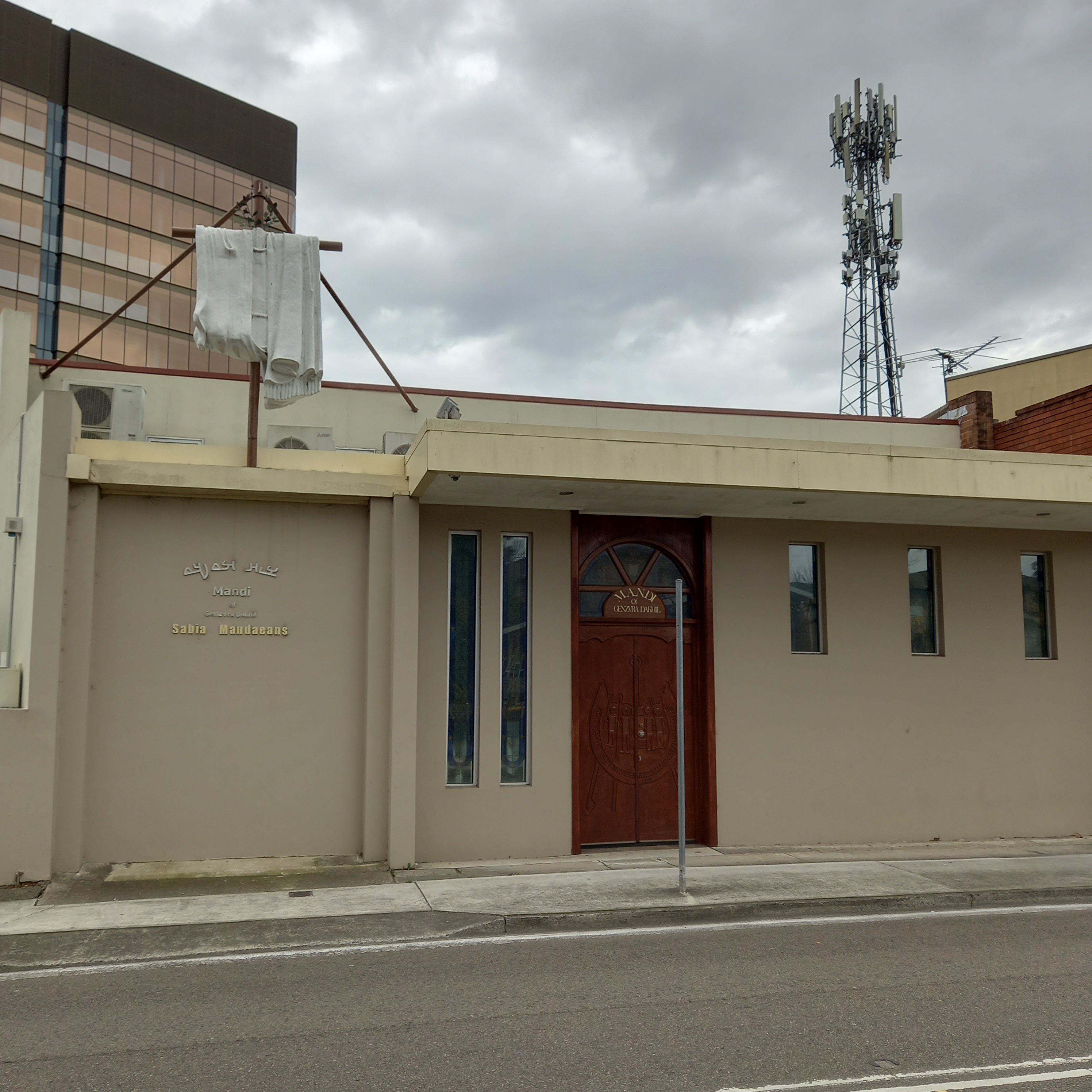
- Ganzibra Dakhil Mandi in 2023

Religion
- Affiliation: Mandaeism
- Governing body: Sabian Mandaean Association in Australia
- Leadership: Rishama Salah Choheili

Location
- Municipality: Liverpool
- State: New South Wales
- Country: Australia
- Interactive map of Ganzibra Dakhil Mandi
- Coordinates: 33.9265°S 150.9235°E

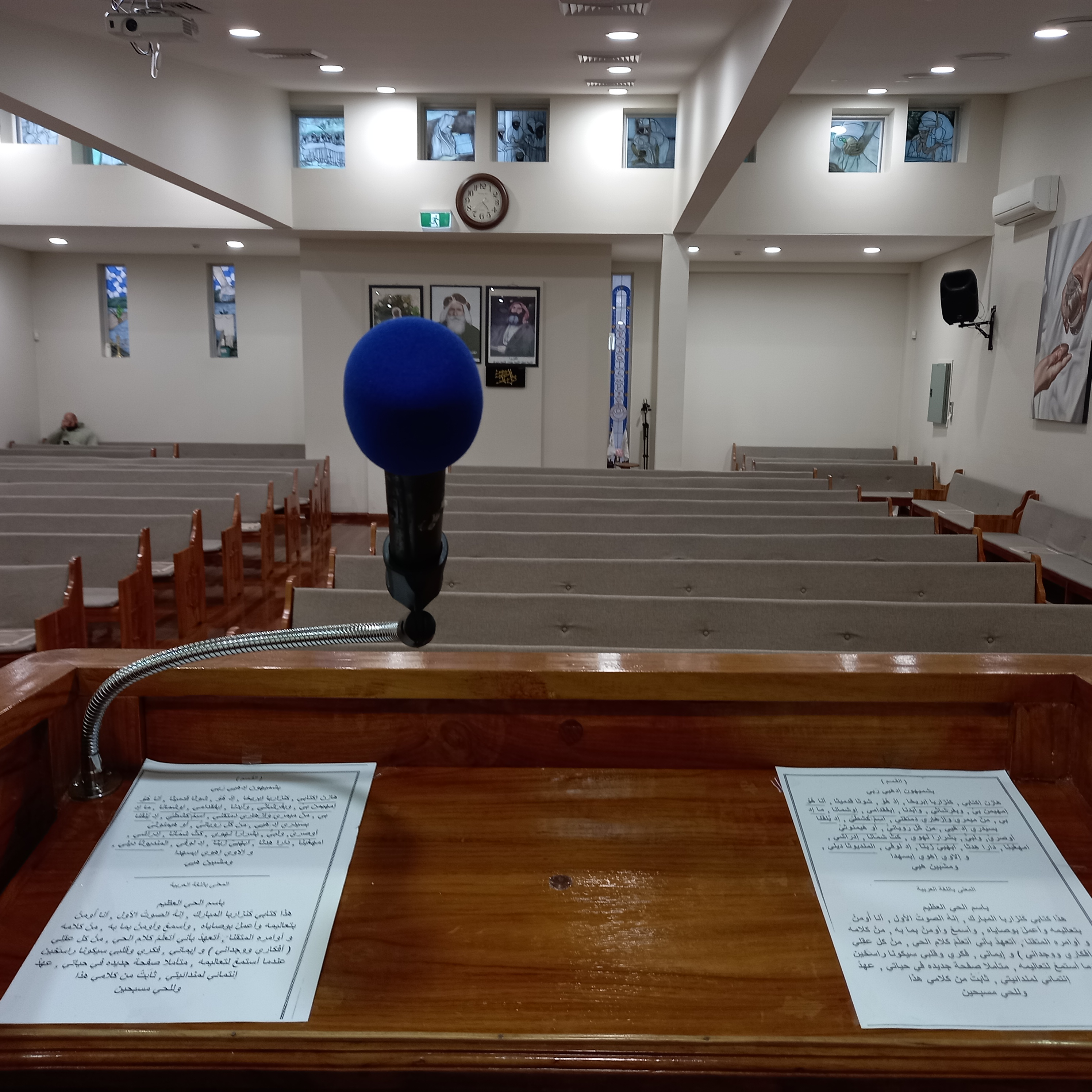
View of the mandi's interior from the pulpit

Ganzibra Dakhil Mandi (officially registered as Mandi Genzvra Dakhil) is a Mandaean temple (mandi) in Liverpool, New South Wales, Australia. It is named after Rishama Dakhil Aidan, who was the head priest of the Mandaean community in Iraq from 1917 to 1964.

== Clergy ==
Rishama Salah Choheili currently serves as the head priest of the mandi. Other priests serving at the mandi include Anhar Hassan Faraj.

== Sabian Mandaean Association in Australia ==
Ganzibra Dakhil Mandi is affiliated with and administered by the Sabian Mandaean Association in Australia, which is also supervising the construction and expansion of Wallacia Mandi (also known as Mendi Wallacia) located by the banks of the Nepean River in Wallacia, New South Wales. Since flowing river water is required for Mandaean baptisms, Ganzibra Dakhil Mandi congregation members go to Wallacia Mandi for baptisms, while Ganzibra Dakhil Mandi is used for sermons and meetings that do not include baptismal rituals.

== See also ==
- Wallacia Mandi
- Yahya Yuhana Mandi
- Mandaean Australians
