= Suleyman Sleyman =

Swedish-Assyrian footballer

Personal information
- Date of birth: 28 December 1979 (age 46)
- Place of birth: Södertälje, Sweden
- Position: Defender

Senior career*
Years	Team	Apps	(Gls)
1996–1997	Syrianska FC	27	(4)
1998–2008	Hammarby IF	167	(1)
2000	→ Syrianska FC (loan)	4	(0)
2009–2013	Syrianska FC	85	(2)
Total		283	(7)

International career
1995–1996	Sweden U17	14	(1)
1997	Sweden U19	3	(0)
2008	Sweden	1	(0)
- * Club domestic league appearances and goals

Suleyman Sleyman (born 28 December 1979) is a Swedish former professional footballer who played as a defender.

== Club career ==
Sleyman joined Hammarby IF from Syrianska FC in 1998. He signed for a continuation with Hammarby IF in September 2007, which expired at the end of the 2008 season. He scored his first goal for Hammarby in August 2008, after almost ten years in the club, in the derby where Hammarby faced AIK, 2–2.

He left Hammarby at contract's end and on 26 February 2009, he returned to Syrianska FC. On March 5, 2014, Sleyman officially announced his retirement.

== International career ==
Sleyman represented the Sweden U17 and U19 teams between 1995 and 1997, and made his full international debut for the Sweden national team in a friendly 1–0 win against Costa Rica on 13 January 2008 when he played for 71 minutes before being replaced by Peter Larsson.

== Personal life ==
Sleyman belongs to the Assyrian community, and declares as Syriac (Swedish: syrian).

== Honours ==
Hammarby

- Allsvenskan: 2001
