= Yahya Yuhana Mandi =

Mandaean temple in Prestons, New South Wales, Australia

Yahya Yuhana Mandi Mandi Yehya Youhanna
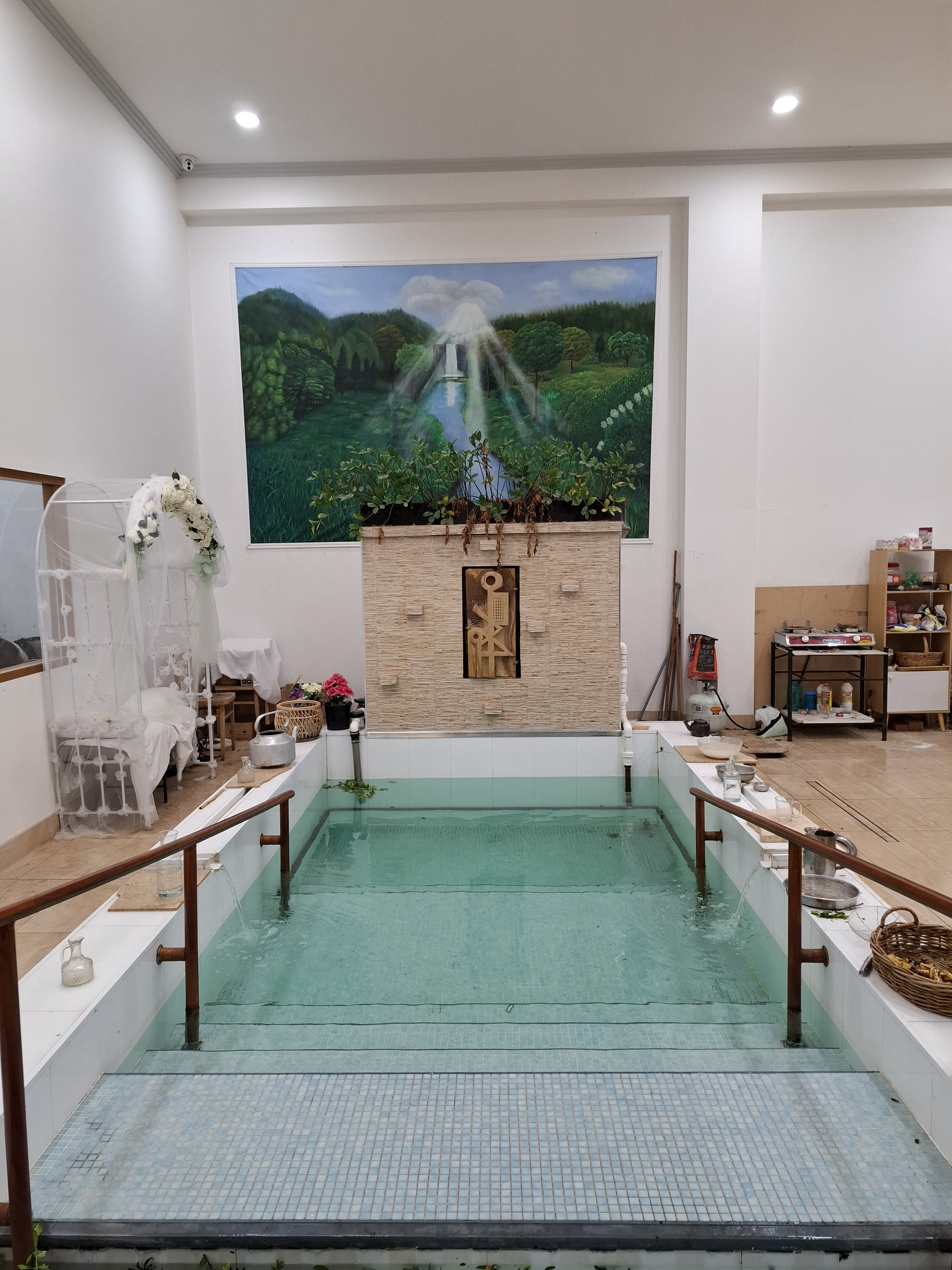
- The indoor baptismal pool of Yahya Yuhana Mandi in March 2025

Religion
- Affiliation: Mandaeism
- Leadership: Ganzibra Khaldoon Majid Abdullah

Location
- Location: Prestons
- Municipality: Liverpool
- State: New South Wales
- Country: Australia
- Interactive map of Yahya Yuhana Mandi; Mandi Yehya Youhanna
- Coordinates: 33.9309°S 150.8847°E

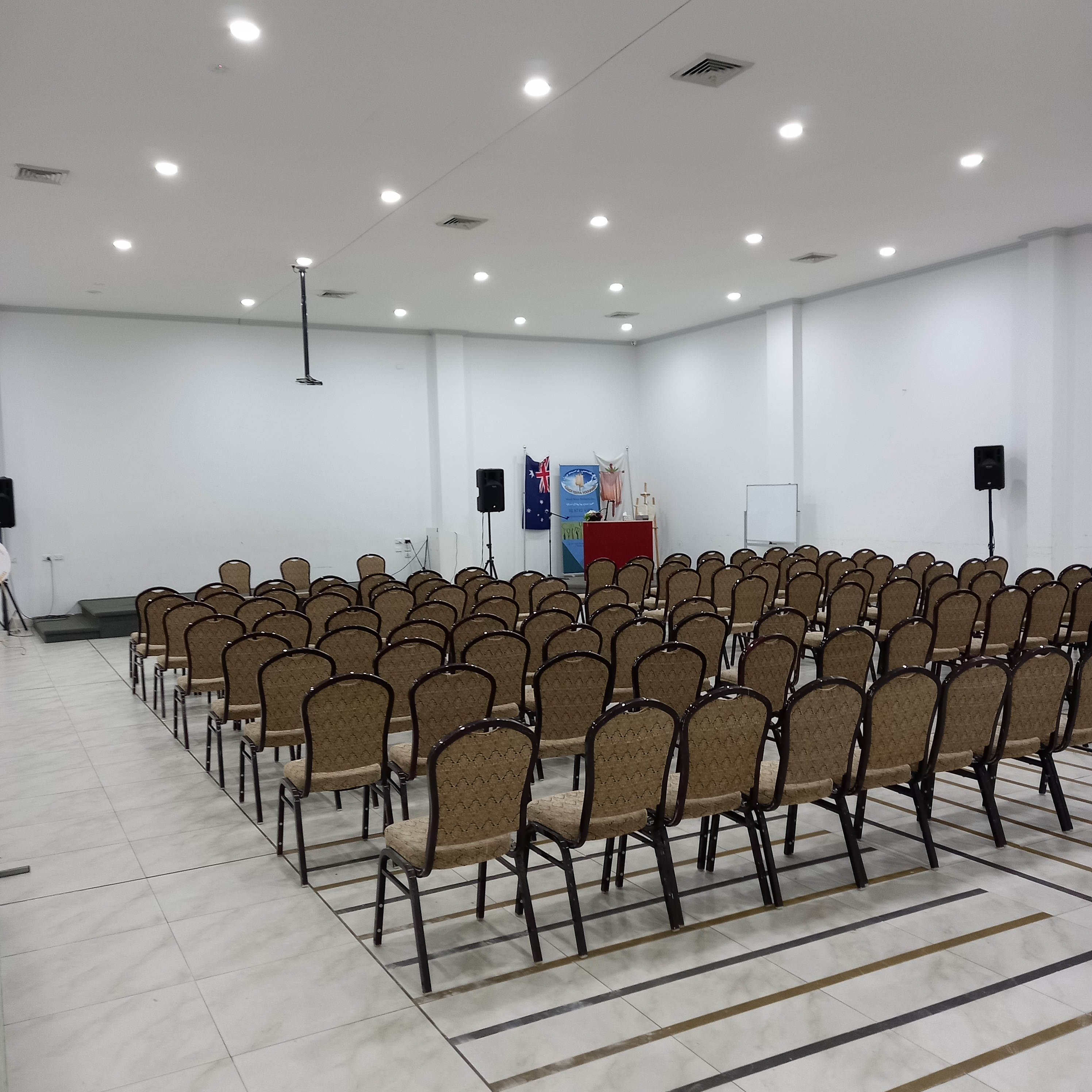
The mandi's congregation hall

Yahya Yuhana Mandi (officially registered as Mandi Yehya Youhanna) is a Mandaean temple (mandi) in Prestons, New South Wales, Australia. It is named after John the Baptist, who is known as Yahya Yuhana in Mandaic.

Unlike Ganzibra Dakhil Mandi, which does not have an indoor baptismal pool, Yahya Yuhana Mandi has an indoor baptismal pool utilizing pumped flowing water that is used for masbuta and ablutions (tamasha and rishama). It is similar to a modern Jewish mikveh. A wedding canopy and a clay shkinta are placed next to the pool. The mandi also contains artwork by Yuhana Nashmi. The mandi also has a congregation hall next to the ritual room.

== Clergy ==
Khaldoon Majid Abdullah is currently the ganzibra (senior priest) of Yahya Yuhana Mandi. Sahi Bashikh is a tarmida at the mandi. Another priest at the mandi is Tarmida Muneer Ashor.

== See also ==
- Ganzibra Dakhil Mandi
- Mandaean Australians
