= Mandaean Americans =

People born in or residing in the US of Mandaean origin

Total population
- 7,000

Regions with significant populations
- California, Texas, Illinois, Michigan, Massachusetts, New York, and other states

Languages
- Iraqi Arabic, Persian, Mandaic, American English

Religion
- Mandaeism

Mandaeans in the United States refers to people born in or residing in the United States of Mandaean origin, or those considered to be ethnic Mandaeans.

== Immigration ==
Mandaean immigration to the United States has been occurring for decades. Abdul Jabbar Abdullah, Nasser Sobbi, and Lamia Abbas Amara were some prominent Mandaeans who immigrated to the United States during the mid-20th century.

Surges in Mandaean immigration happened following the Iran–Iraq War, Gulf War, 2003 invasion of Iraq, and 2006 bombing of the al-Askari Mosque. The Iraq War destabilized the country, causing Mandaeans to be targeted by Islamic extremists. In 2007, The New York Times ran an op-ed piece in which Swarthmore College professor Nathaniel Deutsch called for the George W. Bush administration to take immediate action to preserve the Mandaean community and culture. The same year, Iraqi Mandaeans were given refugee status by the US State Department. Since then, more than 2,500 have entered the U.S.

The Mandaean community in Worcester, Massachusetts, is believed to be the largest in the United States and the second-largest community outside the Middle East. About 2,600 Mandaeans from Iran have been settled in Texas since the Iraq War.

== Communities ==
In the United States, the largest populations of Mandaeans are in Texas and Massachusetts, with additional mid-sized communities in California and Michigan. There are Mandaean communities centered in:

- San Diego, California and El Cajon, California
- Winnetka, Los Angeles, California
- Twin Falls, Idaho
- Worcester, Massachusetts (c. 2,500)
- Metro Detroit, Michigan (in and around Warren, Michigan)
- New York City, New York
- Philadelphia, Pennsylvania
- Austin, Texas
- Amarillo, Texas
- Houston, Texas
- San Antonio, Texas (c. 2,500)

== Notable people ==
- Suhaib Nashi, of the Mandaean Society of America in New Jersey
- Lamia Abbas Amara (1929–2021), Iraqi-born poet who lived in San Diego
- Nasser Sobbi in New York (1924–2018), who owned the largest private collection of Mandaean manuscripts in the United States
- Abdul Jabbar Abdullah (1911–1969), physicist and meteorologist
- Sinan Abdullah (or Sinan Abdul Jabbar Abdullah) (born 1947), the first American-born Mandaean along with his twin brother Haithem Abdullah. His father was Abdul Jabbar Abdullah. Sinan Abdullah was a dentist in New York and owned various Mandaean manuscripts that were analyzed by Jorunn Jacobsen Buckley.
- Fawzi Masboob (d. 2022) of Metro Detroit, the first Mandaean priest to lead a congregation in the United States. His father was Ganzibra Masboob, the last priest in Khorramshahr, Iran.

== See also ==
- Iranian Americans
- Iraqi Americans
- Assyrian Americans
- Kurdish Americans
- Mandaean Australians
- Mandaeans in Sweden
