= Sahi Bashikh =

Iranian Mandaean priest

Tarmida Sahi Bashikh
- ساهي باشخ
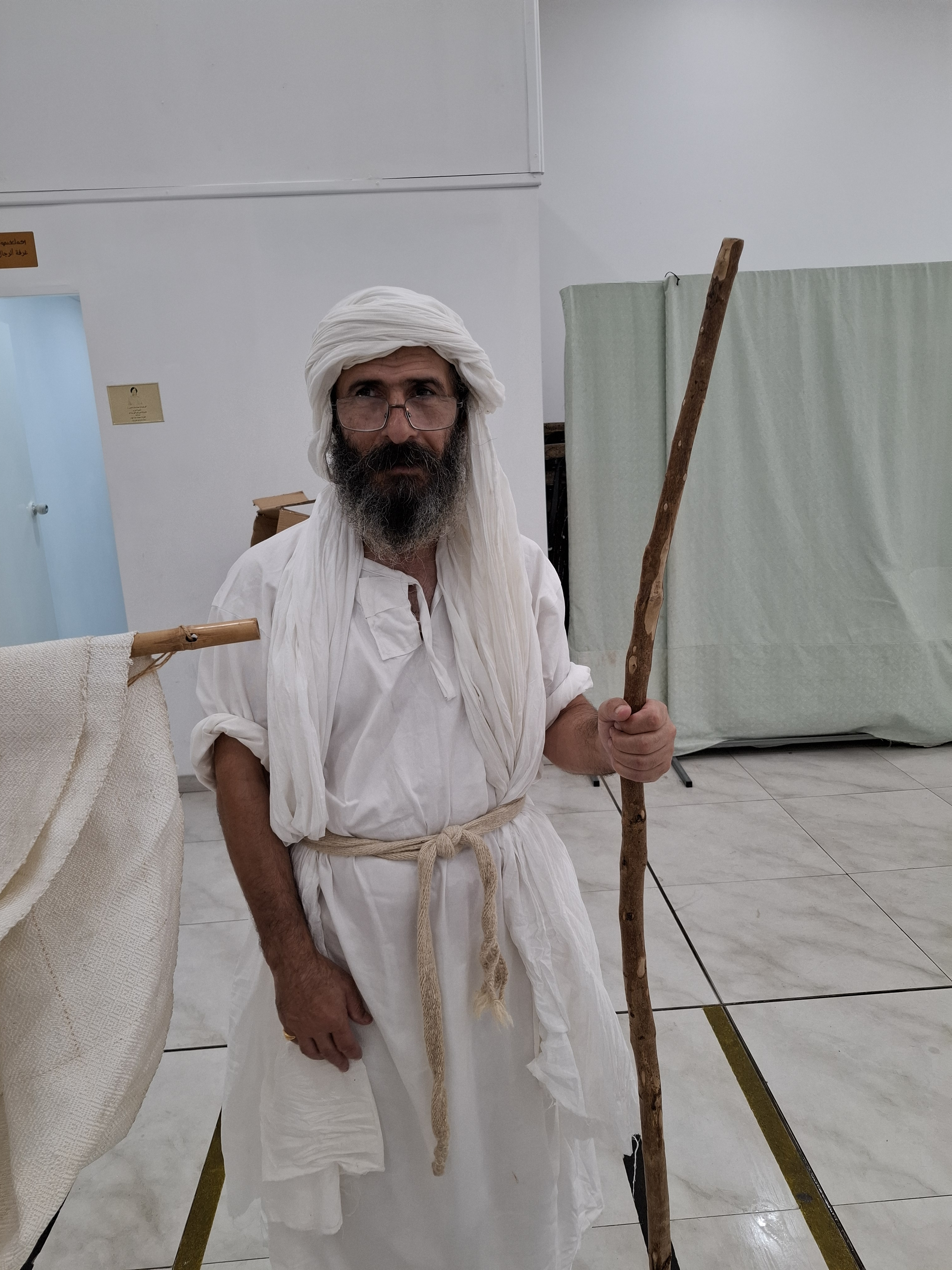
- Tarmida Sahi Bashikh at Yahya Yuhana Mandi during Parwanaya 2025
- Title: Tarmida

Personal life
- Born: 1966 (age 59–60) Susangerd, Khuzestan, Iran
- Other names: Sahi Khamisi; Mhatam Yuhana bar Hawa Simat (ࡌࡄࡀࡕࡀࡌ ࡉࡅࡄࡀࡍࡀ ࡁࡓ ࡄࡀࡅࡀ ࡎࡉࡌࡀࡕ)
- Occupation: Mandaean priest

Religious life
- Religion: Mandaeism
- Initiation: Tarmida; 2019; Yahya Yuhana Mandi by Khaldoon Majid Abdullah

Tarmida Sahi Bashikh Al-Zahrooni (Arabic: ساهي باشخ الزهروني, also known as Sahi Khamisi ساهي خمیسی; born 1966, in Susangerd, Khuzestan, Iran) is an Iranian-Australian Mandaean priest. He is a priest at Yahya Yuhana Mandi in Sydney, Australia.

== Biography ==
He was born in Susangerd, Khuzestan, Iran in 1966 and lived in Ahvaz for most of his life. His Mandaean baptismal name is Mhatam Yuhana bar Hawa Simat (ࡌࡄࡀࡕࡀࡌ ࡉࡅࡄࡀࡍࡀ ࡁࡓ ࡄࡀࡅࡀ ࡎࡉࡌࡀࡕ). Sahi Bashikh emigrated to Sydney, Australia in 2017. In 2019, he was initiated as a tarmida by Ganzibra Khaldoon Majid Abdullah. He currently lives in the Sydney metropolitan area with his wife and children.

== Publications ==
His books include:

- Khamisi, Sahi (2015). آیا صابئین مندایی را می‌شناسید؟ / Āyā Sābe’īn-e Mandāyī rā mishenāsīd? [Do You Know the Sabaean Mandaeans?]. Tehran: Yadavaran. ISBN 9789645824516. (in Persian)
- صابئین قوم همیشه زنده تاریخ / The Sabaeans are a living people throughout history. ISBN 9789648593181. (in Persian)
- أبناء الحياة / The sons of Life. ISBN 9780975647509. (in Arabic)
