= St. Aphrem Cathedral, Södertälje =

Syriac Orthodox cathedral in Södertälje, Sweden

Coordinates: 59.196444°N 17.577406°E

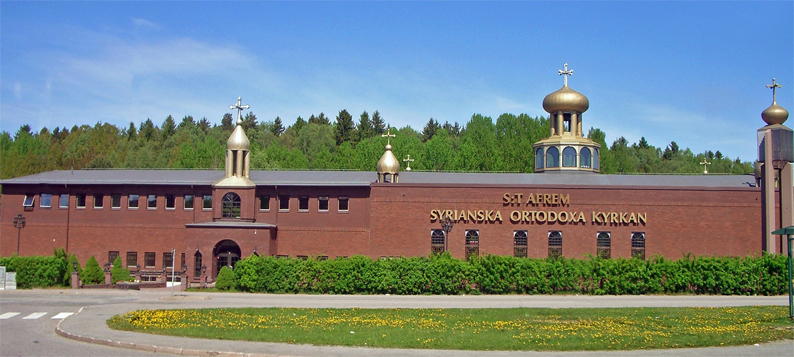

The Saint Afram Syriac Orthodox Cathedral (Swedish: Sankt Afrems katedral i Södertälje) is a Syriac Orthodox cathedral in Södertälje, Sweden. It was opened in 1983, and is governed by the Syriac Orthodox Patriarchate's Representation in Sweden. "It was not until 1983 that Syriacs constructed their first large-scale, purpose-built church in Södertälje. While they could use Swedish churches, their liturgical needs and social practices were not readily adaptable to these, nor were existing structures able to accommodate the hundreds of Syriac congregants who wanted to attend services. The first Syriac-commissioned church, St. Afrem’s, designed by a Swedish architect, was given a discreet exterior that concealed a decorative interior—primarily the product of donated Syriac labor and craftsmanship."
