= Nadia Jebril =

Swedish-Palestinian journalist and TV host

Nadia Jebril (born 1982 in Sweden) whose parents are Palestinian, is a journalist and TV host at the Swedish television (SVT),
