= Khaldoon Majid Abdullah =

Mandaean priest in Australia

Ganzibra Khaldoon Majid Abdullah
- خلدون ماجد عبدالله
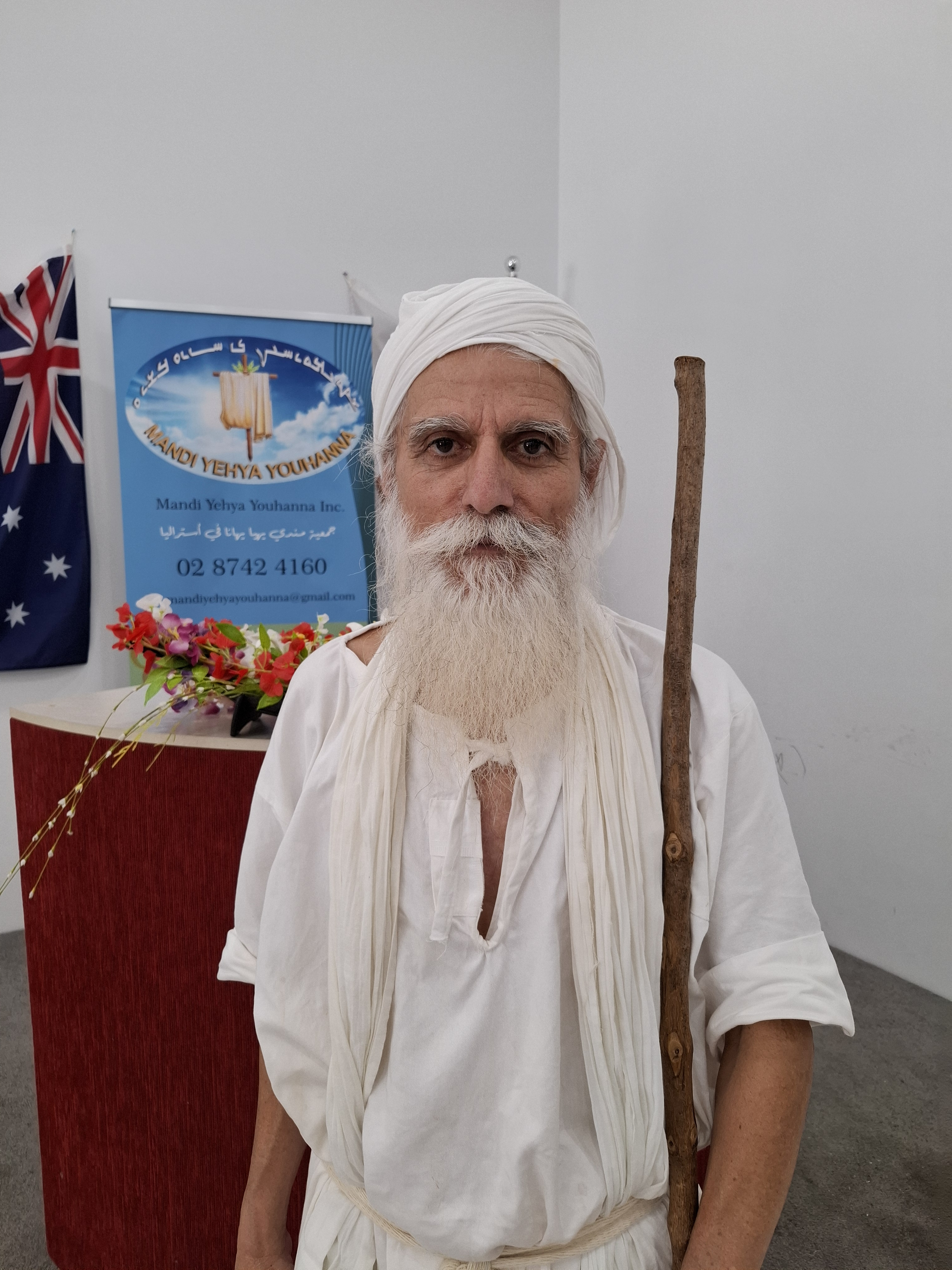
- Ganzibra Khaldoon Majid Abdullah at Yahya Yuhana Mandi during Parwanaya 2025
- Title: Ganzibra

Personal life
- Born: March 16, 1963 (age 63) Amarah, Maysan Governorate, Iraq
- Citizenship: Australian
- Other name: Adam bar Maliha (ࡀࡃࡀࡌ ࡁࡓ ࡌࡀࡋࡉࡄࡀ)
- Occupation: Mandaean priest

Religious life
- Religion: Mandaeism
- Initiation: Tarmida; 1995; Baghdad by Tarmida Khalaf Abed Raba and Rishamma Abdullah bar negm

Senior posting
- Initiated: Sahi Bashikh

Ganzibra Khaldoon Majid Abdullah (Arabic: خلدون ماجد عبدالله; born 16 March 1963, in Amarah, Maysan Governorate, Iraq) is an Iraqi-Australian Mandaean priest. He is currently the ganzibra (senior priest) of Yahya Yuhana Mandi (also known as Mandi Yehya Yahana or Mandi Yehya Youhanna) in Prestons, New South Wales, Australia.

== Biography ==
Khaldoon Majid Abdullah was born on 16 March 1963 in Amarah, Maysan Governorate, Iraq. His Mandaean baptismal name is Adam bar Maliha (ࡀࡃࡀࡌ ࡁࡓ ࡌࡀࡋࡉࡄࡀ). His father died when he was 4 months old. When he was 7 years old, he moved to Baghdad.

In 1995, he was initiated as a tarmida by his rabbi, Tarmida Khalaf Abed Raba, when he was 32 years old. Rishamma Abdullah bar Sam was the head priest supervising the initiation at the time. Khaldoon Majid Abdullah later attained the rank of ganzibra and emigrated to Australia. In 2019, he initiated Sahi Bashikh, who had arrived in Australia from Iran in 2017, as a tarmida. As of 2023, he serves as the head priest of Yahya Yuhana Mandi in the Sydney metropolitan area, Australia.

His mother's uncle was Sheikh Tarmida Salem Shukhair of Amarah, who was initiated as a tarmida in 1967 and died in 2003.

== See also ==
- Salah Choheili
- Brikha Nasoraia
- Sahi Bashikh
