= Shkinta =

Celestial dwelling or ritual hut in Mandaeism

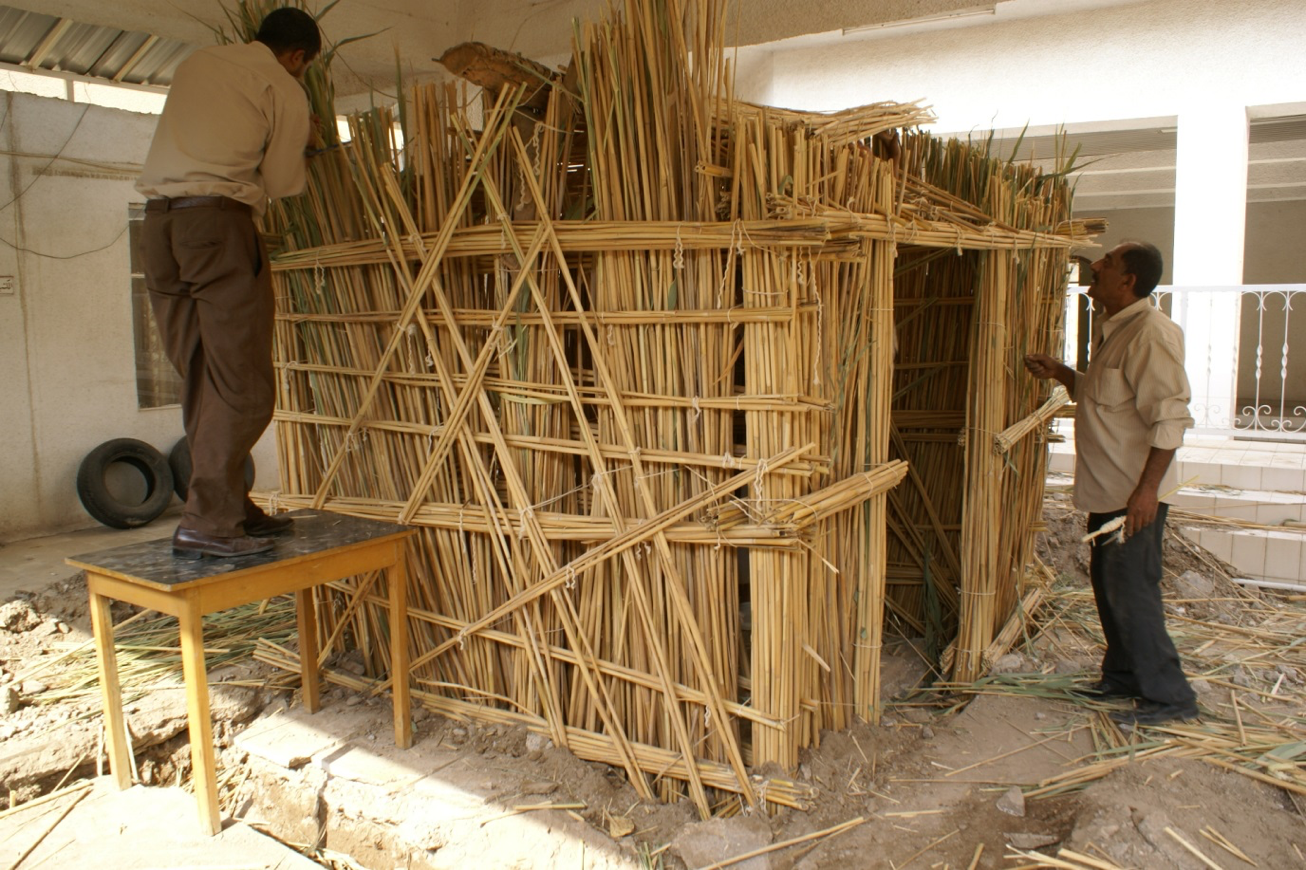
A shkinta being constructed for a tarmida initiation ceremony in Baghdad in 2008

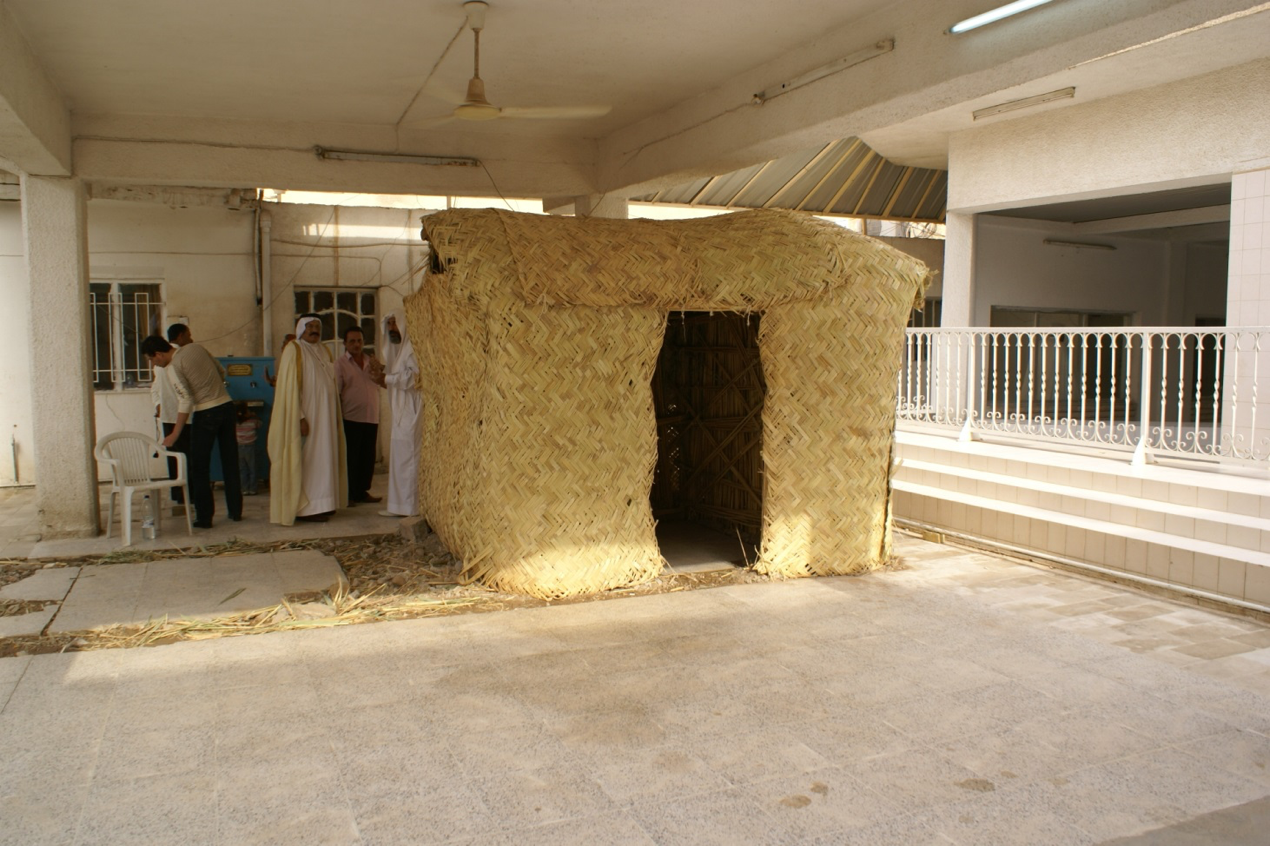
A completed shkinta

In Mandaeism, a shkinta (Classical Mandaic: ࡔࡊࡉࡍࡕࡀ, romanized: škinta, lit. 'shekinah'; plural form: Classical Mandaic: ࡔࡊࡉࡍࡀࡕࡀ, romanized: škinata) or shkina (škina) is a celestial dwelling inhabited by uthras in the World of Light that is analogous to the shekhinah in Jewish mysticism. In Tibil (the physical earth), it refers to a reed or mud hut that is used during Mandaean priest initiation ceremonies, since Mandaean priests represent uthras on earth.

== Ceremonial usage ==
During the priest initiation ceremony, the shkinta is constructed to the north of the andiruna. It symbolizes the World of Light and it covered by a white cloth roof. In contrast, the andiruna has a blue cloth roof to symbolize the color of Ruha. Together, the two adjacent huts symbolize complementary masculine and feminine elements.

== Symbolism ==
The škinta (cognate with the Hebrew word shekhinah; from the Semitic root š-k-n, associated with dwellings) symbolizes the "male" side, and is associated with the World of Light, priests, the right side, gold, and the taga (crown).

In contrast, the andiruna symbolizes the "female" side, and is associated with the earth (Tibil), laypeople, the left side, silver, and the klila (myrtle wreath). Similarly, in a traditional Persian house, the women's quarters are known as andirūn.

== In artwork ==
In 2018, Mandaean-Australian priest and artist Yuhana Nashmi created Sh-ken-ta, an exhibition of a shkinta, as a site-specific installation at the Casula Powerhouse Arts Centre.

== Gallery ==
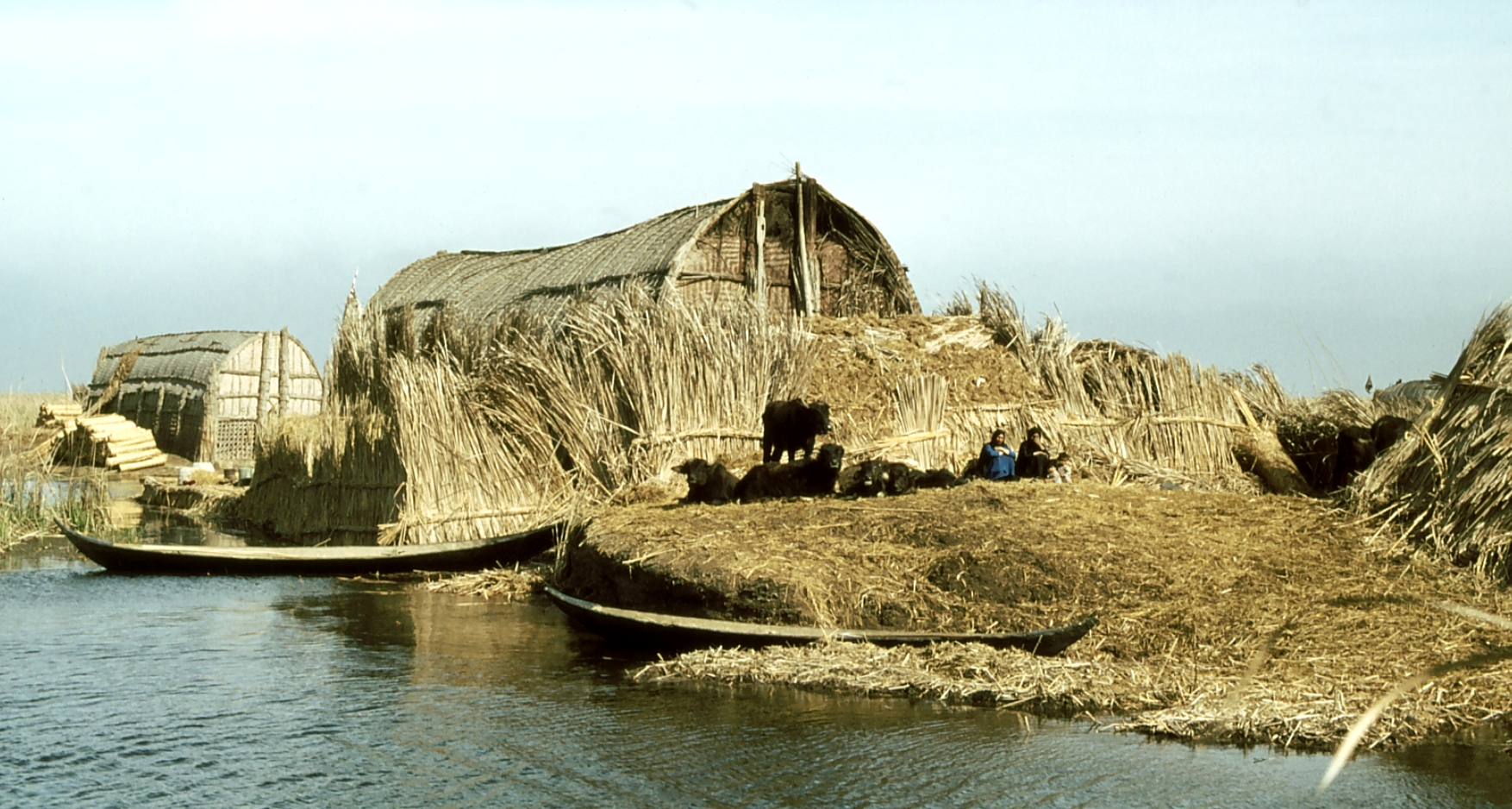
A reed house in the marshes of Basra Province, southern Iraq in 1978. The shkinta is based on such reed structures.

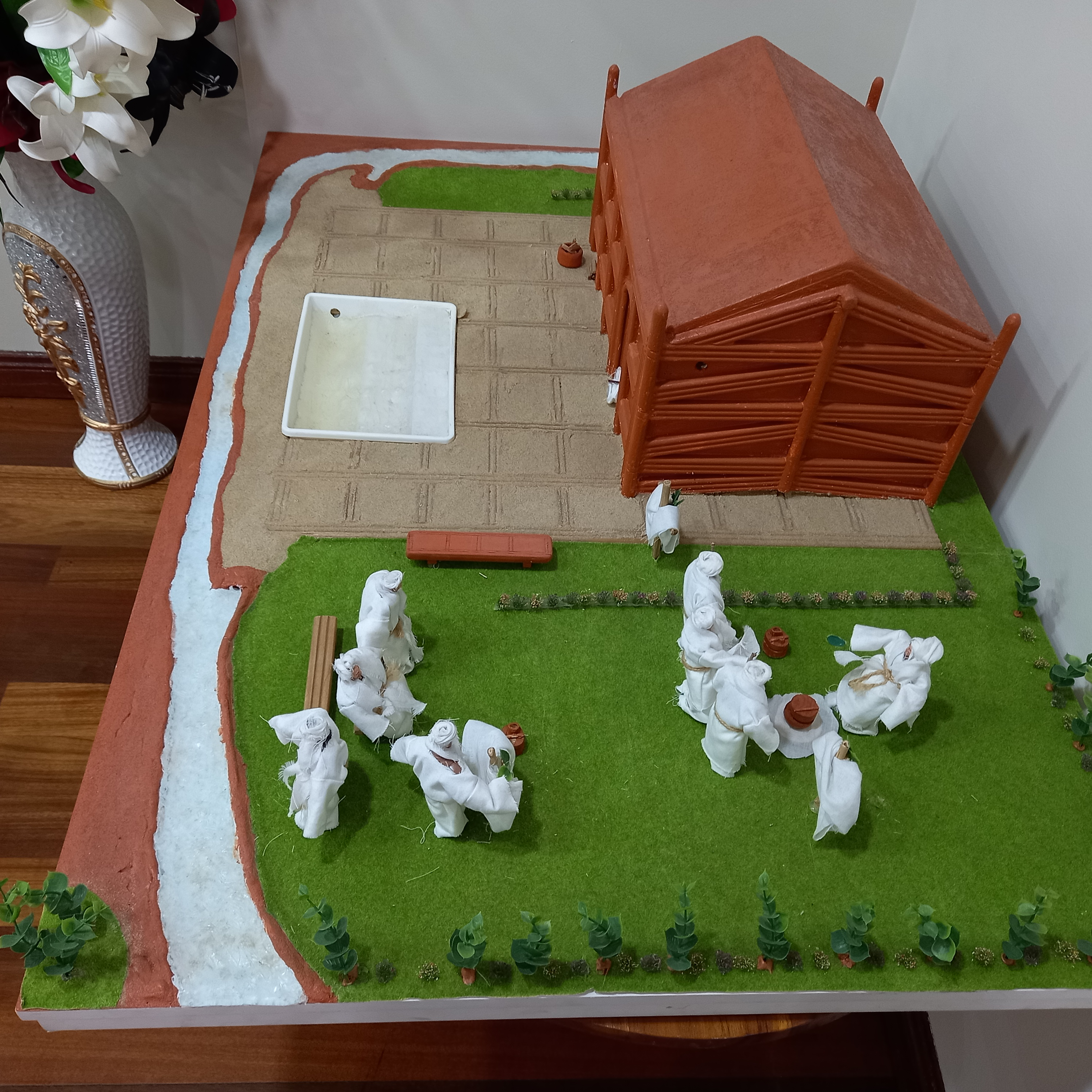
Miniature model of a shkinta displayed at Ganzibra Dakhil Mandi in Liverpool, New South Wales, Australia

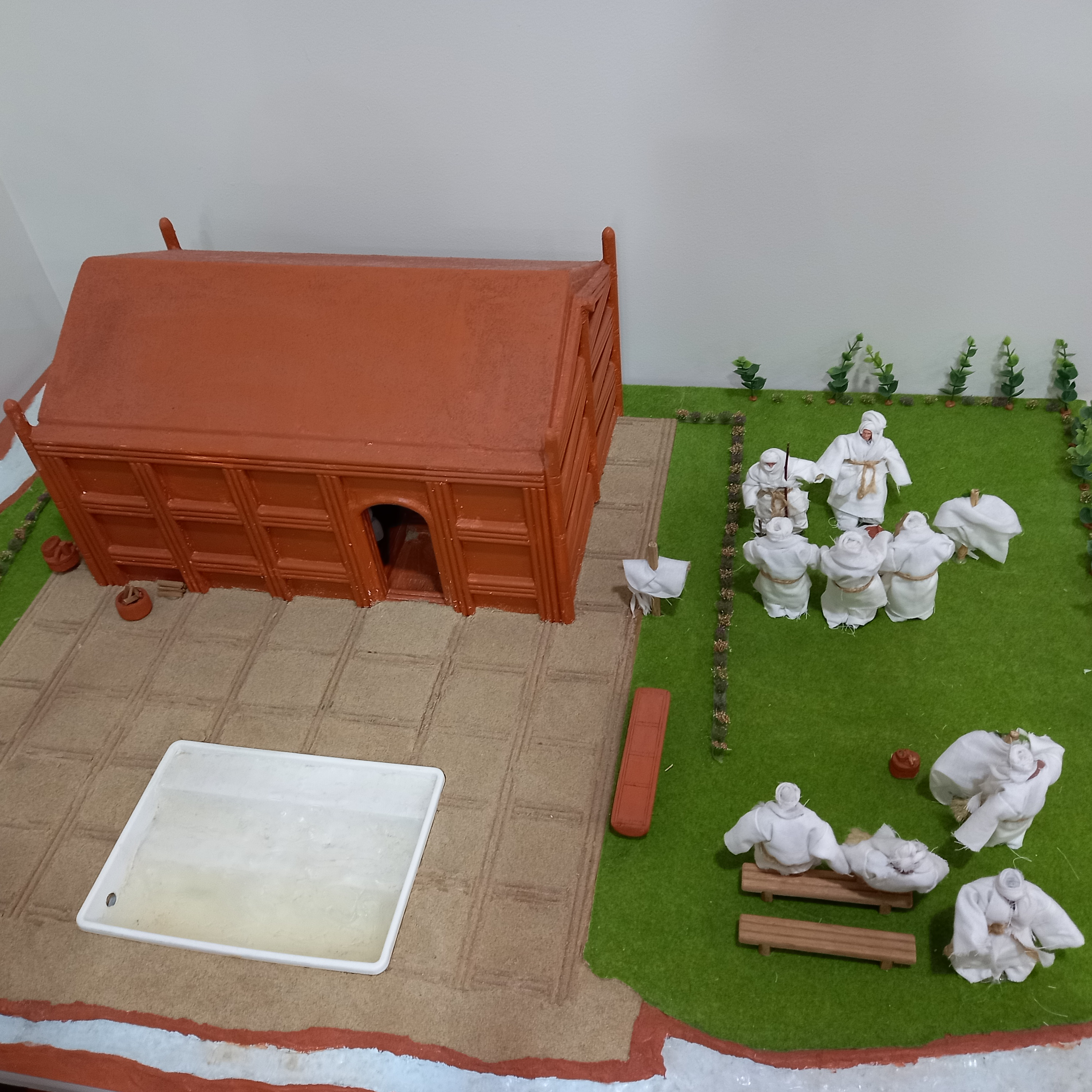
Miniature model of a shkinta displayed at Ganzibra Dakhil Mandi in Liverpool, New South Wales, Australia

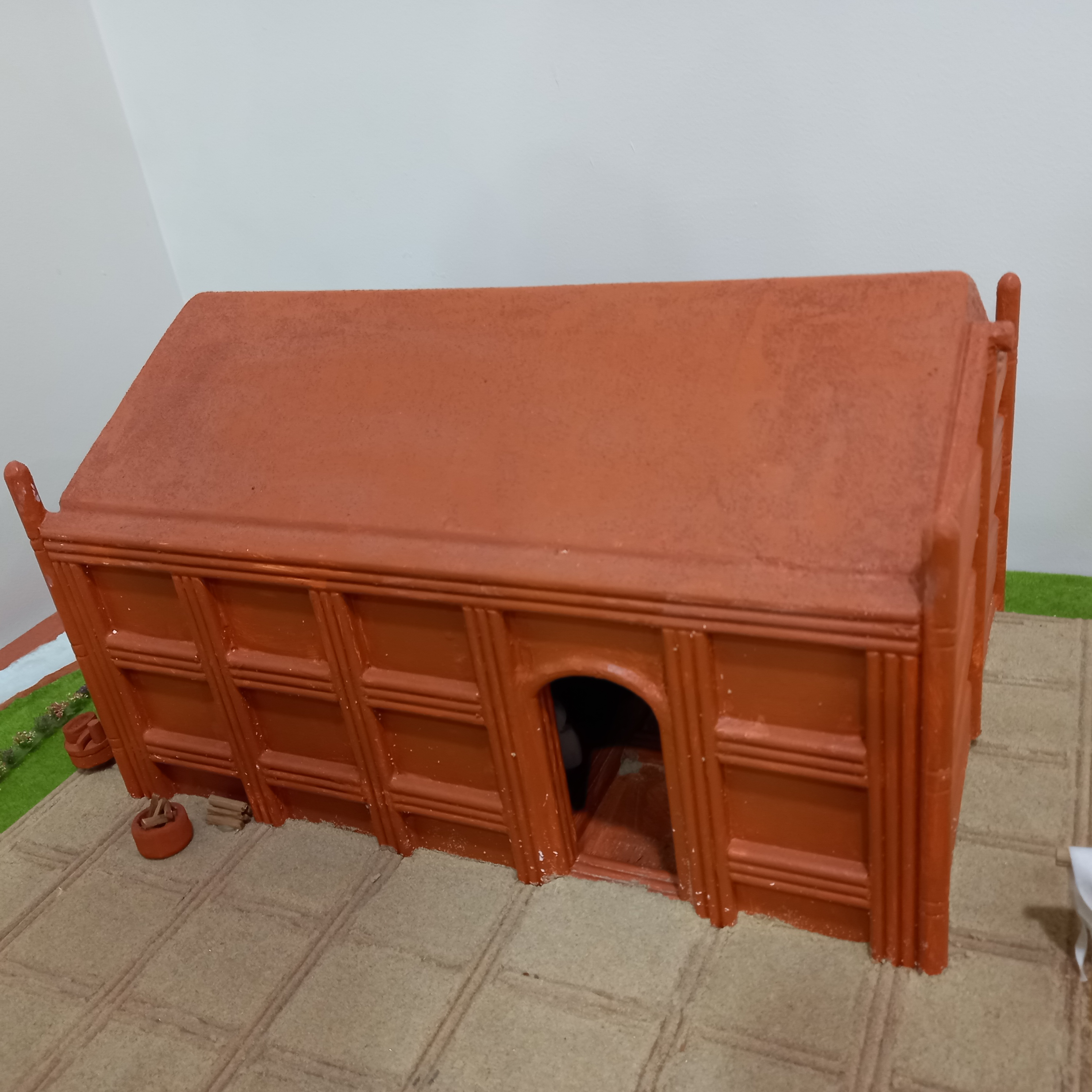
Miniature model of a shkinta displayed at Ganzibra Dakhil Mandi in Liverpool, New South Wales, Australia

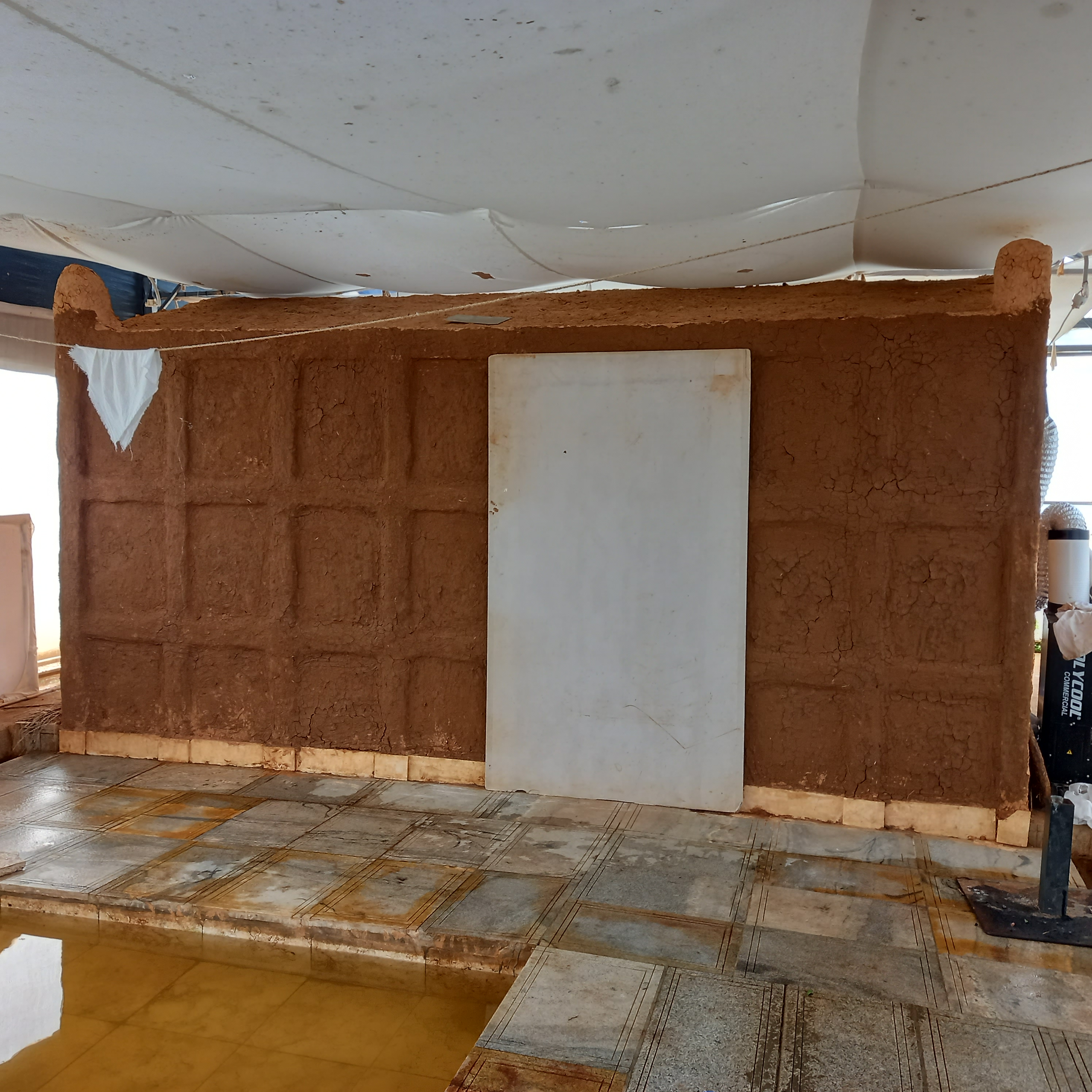
Shkinta located adjacent to Wallacia Mandi in Wallacia, New South Wales, Australia

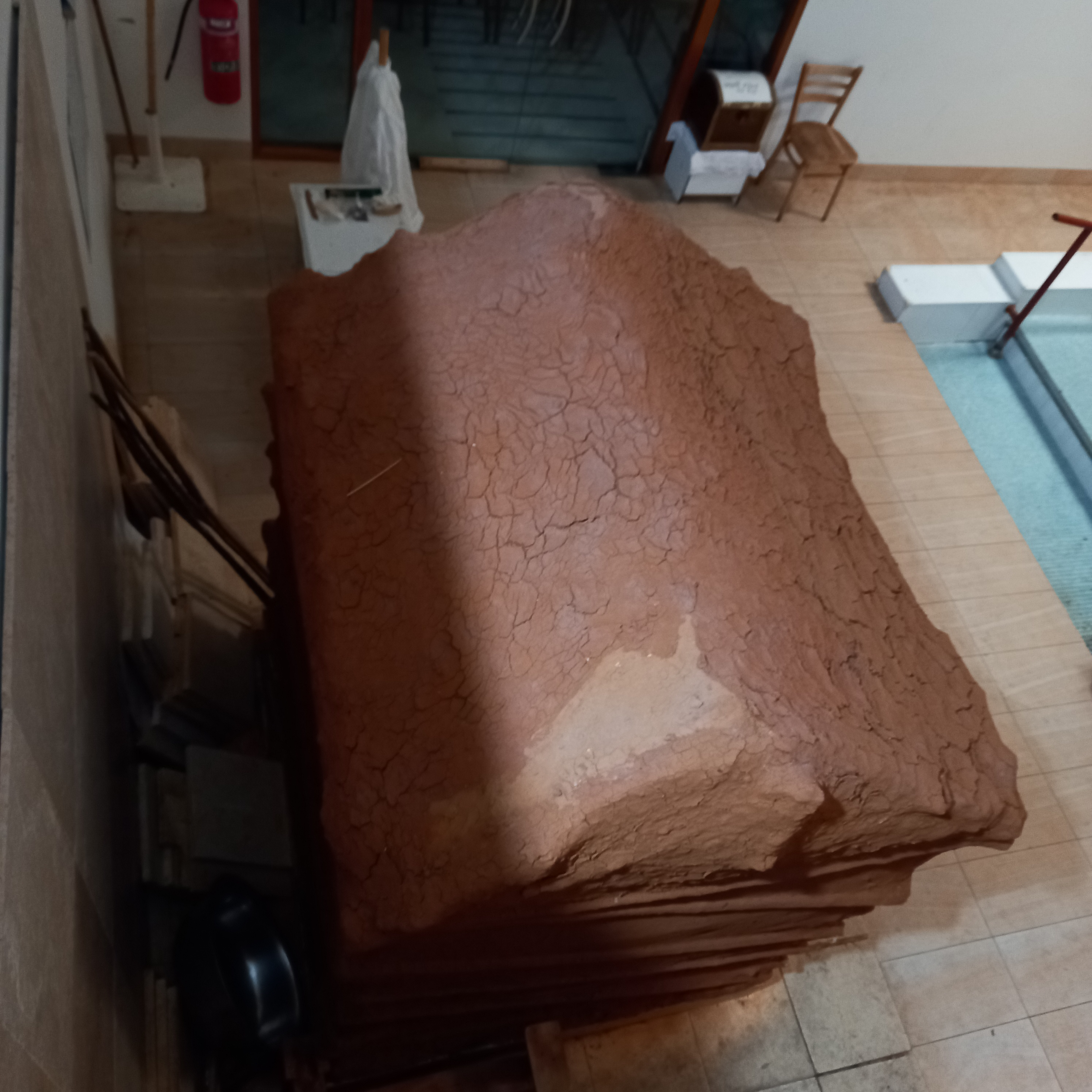
Shkinta located inside Yahya Yuhana Mandi in Prestons, New South Wales, Australia

== See also ==
- Andiruna
- Shekhinah
- Sweat lodge in Native American spiritual ceremonies
- Tarmida
- Anana (Mandaeism)
