= Andiruna =

Priest initiation hut in Mandaeism

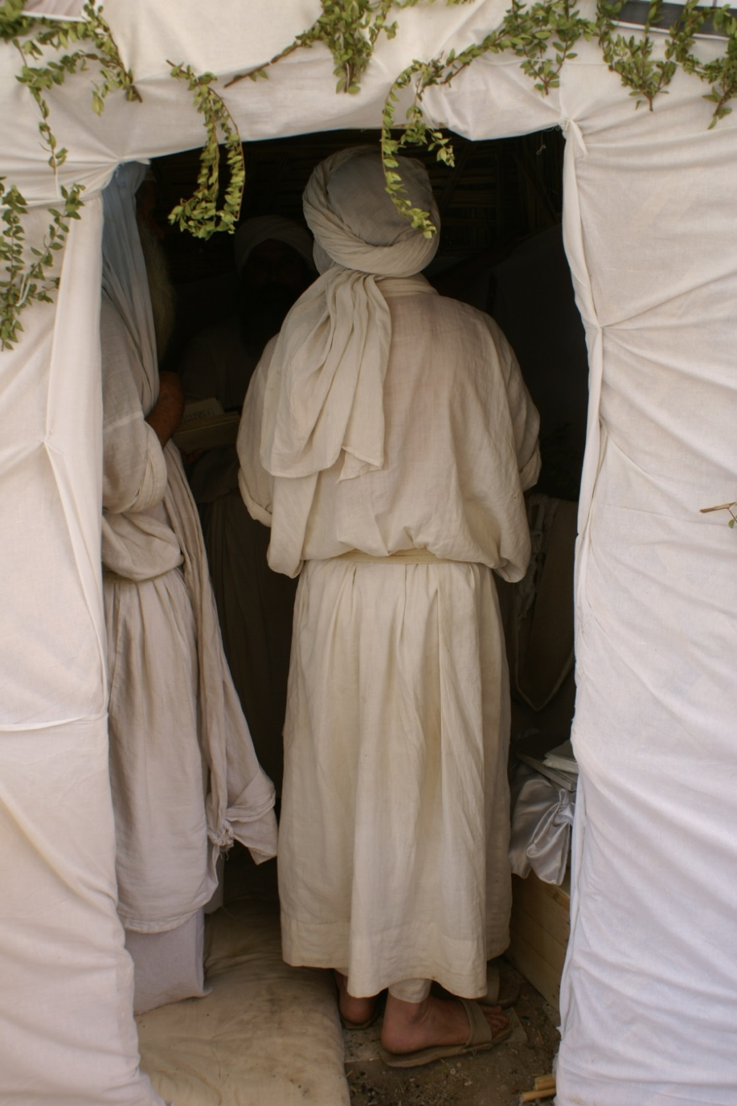
A tarmida initiate in the andiruna

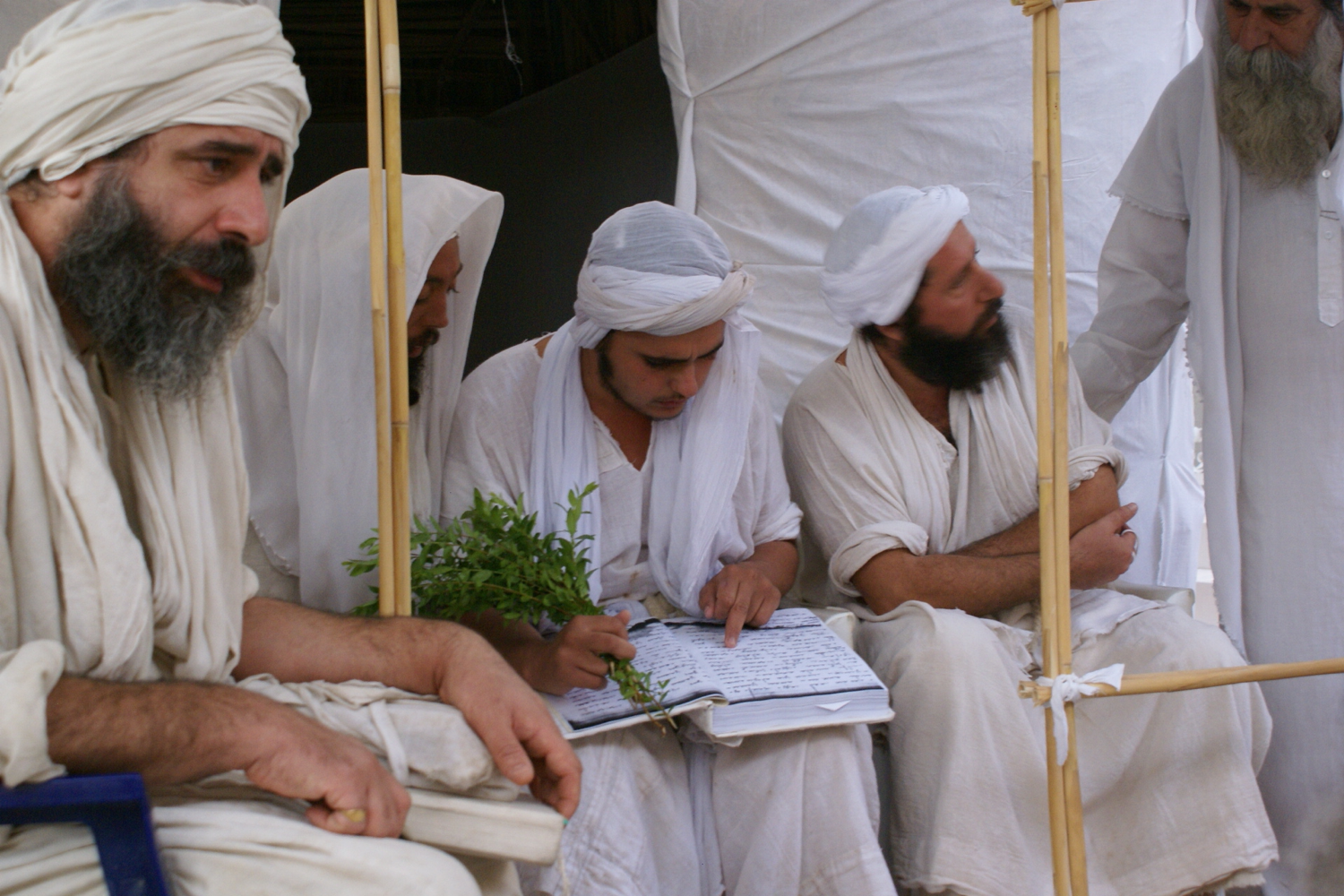
The young man in the middle, who is undergoing the tarmida initiation ceremony, is reading the Sidra ḏ-Nišmata, the first section of the Qulasta, as he sits in front of the andiruna.

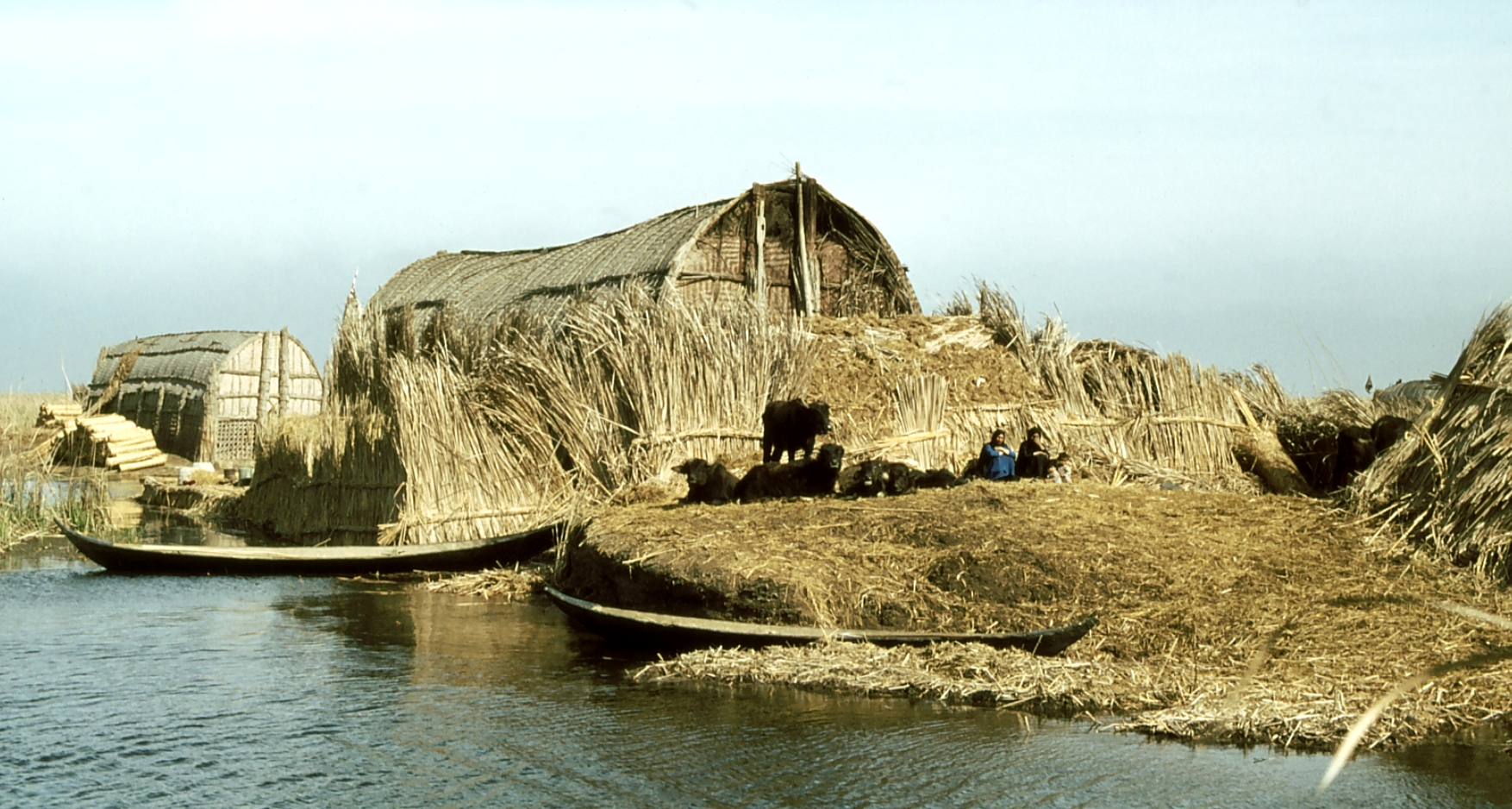
A reed house in the marshes of Basra Province, southern Iraq in 1978. The andiruna is based on such reed structures.

An andiruna (Classical Mandaic: ࡏࡍࡃࡉࡓࡅࡍࡀ, romanized: ʿndiruna, lit. 'chamber') is a temporary reed hut used during Mandaean priest initiation ceremonies.

== Etymology ==
The term andiruna or ʿndiruna (ʿndruna) literally means 'chamber' and can also be used to refer to a wedding chamber or canopy.

== Ceremonial usage ==
Several different priestly texts, including the Scroll of Exalted Kingship (Classical Mandaic: Diwan Malkuta ʿLaita) and The Great Supreme World (Classical Mandaic: Alma Rišaia Rba), need to kept in the andiruna hut during the initiation ceremony, or else the ceremony would be deemed invalid without the presence of the texts.

During the tarmida initiation ceremony, the initiating priest (rba) and the novice stay in the andiruna hut for one entire week without sleeping. The priest and the novice emerge from the hut after the 7 days are completed, and the hut is taken down. Afterwards, the novice undergoes 60 days of seclusion at home.

== Symbolism ==
During the priest initiation ceremony, another reed hut, the škinta, is constructed to the north of the andiruna. It symbolizes the World of Light and it covered by a white cloth roof. In contrast, the andiruna has a blue cloth roof to symbolize the color of Ruha. Together, the two adjacent huts symbolize complementary masculine and feminine elements.

The andiruna symbolizes the "female" side, and is associated with the earth (Tibil), laypeople, the left side, silver, and the klila (myrtle wreath). Similarly, in a traditional Persian house, the women's quarters are known as andirūn.

The škinta (cognate with the Hebrew word shekhinah; from the Semitic root š-k-n, associated with dwellings) symbolizes the "male" side, and is associated with the World of Light, priests, the right side, gold, and the taga (crown).

Andiruna	Shkinta
female	male
Tibil	World of Light
laypeople	priests
left side (smal ࡎࡌࡀࡋ)	right side (yamin ࡉࡀࡌࡉࡍ)
south (timia)	north (girbia)
silver (kaspa)	gold (dahba)
klila	taga

== See also ==
- Sweat lodge in Native American spiritual ceremonies
- Valentinianism § Bridal Chamber
