= Crown of justification =

Ancient Egyptian funerary practice

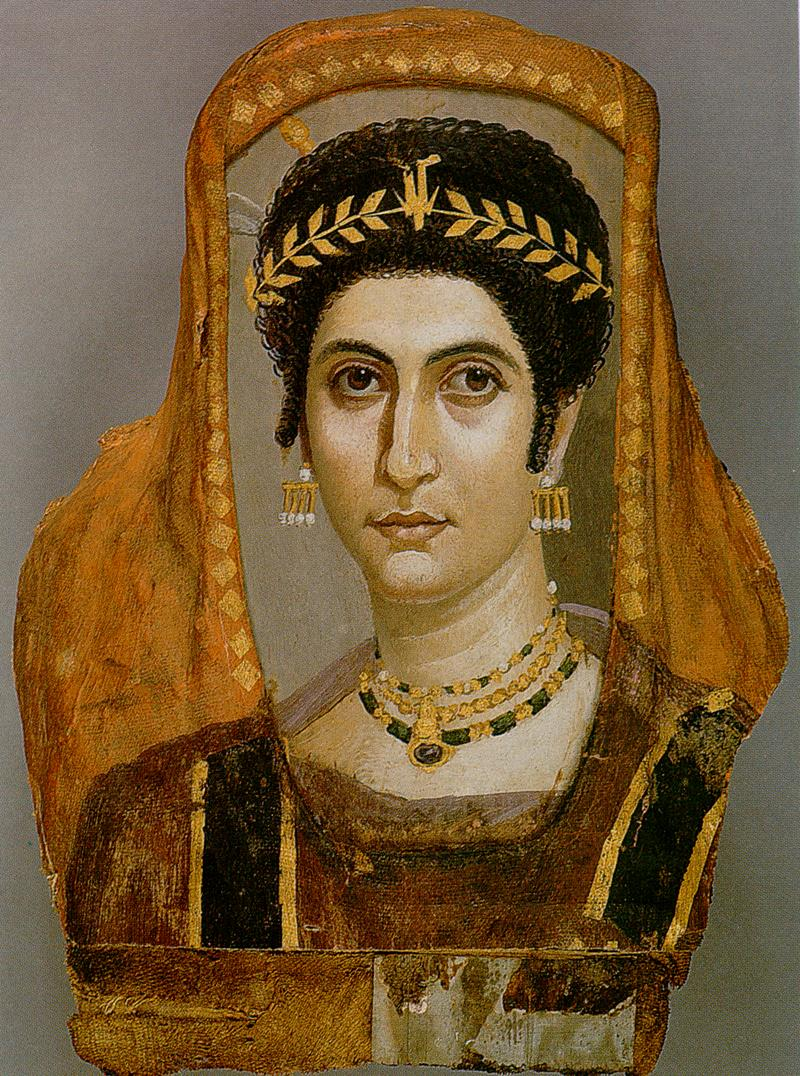
Crown of justification on an encaustic Fayum mummy portrait with the name Isidora ("gifts of Isis") given in Greek (100-110 CE)

In ancient Egyptian religion, the crown of justification (mꜣḥ n mꜣꜥ ḫrw) was a wreath or fillet worn by the deceased to represent victory over death in the afterlife. Its symbolism is based on Chapter 19 of the Book of the Dead, in which the wearer is said to be "justified" by a triumph over death just as the god Osiris eventually rose above his enemies. A ritual text was recited as the dead person was crowned.

The crown of justification might be made of laurel, palm, feathers, papyrus, or precious metals. It was syncretized with the solar crown of the sun god Re, and might be made of gold to mimic the properties of the sun. Among the collections of the Museum of Fine Arts, Boston, is an intricately woven papyrus wreath with bronze insets to reflect light. In the Roman era, initiates into the mysteries of Isis might wear a wreath of palm leaves to suggest the rays of the sun.

In the Ptolemaic and Roman Imperial periods, religious art in temples shows the king offering the crown to Horus or other deities. These crowns of justification take the form of a circlet, which sometimes has a uraeus or wedjat-eye. Rose wreaths might be substituted during the Roman period, in reference to the use of rose garlands and wreaths in the Romanized mysteries of Isis. The crown of justification was in this way integrated into the broader festal and religious uses of floral and vegetative wreaths in the Roman Empire.

== Gallery ==
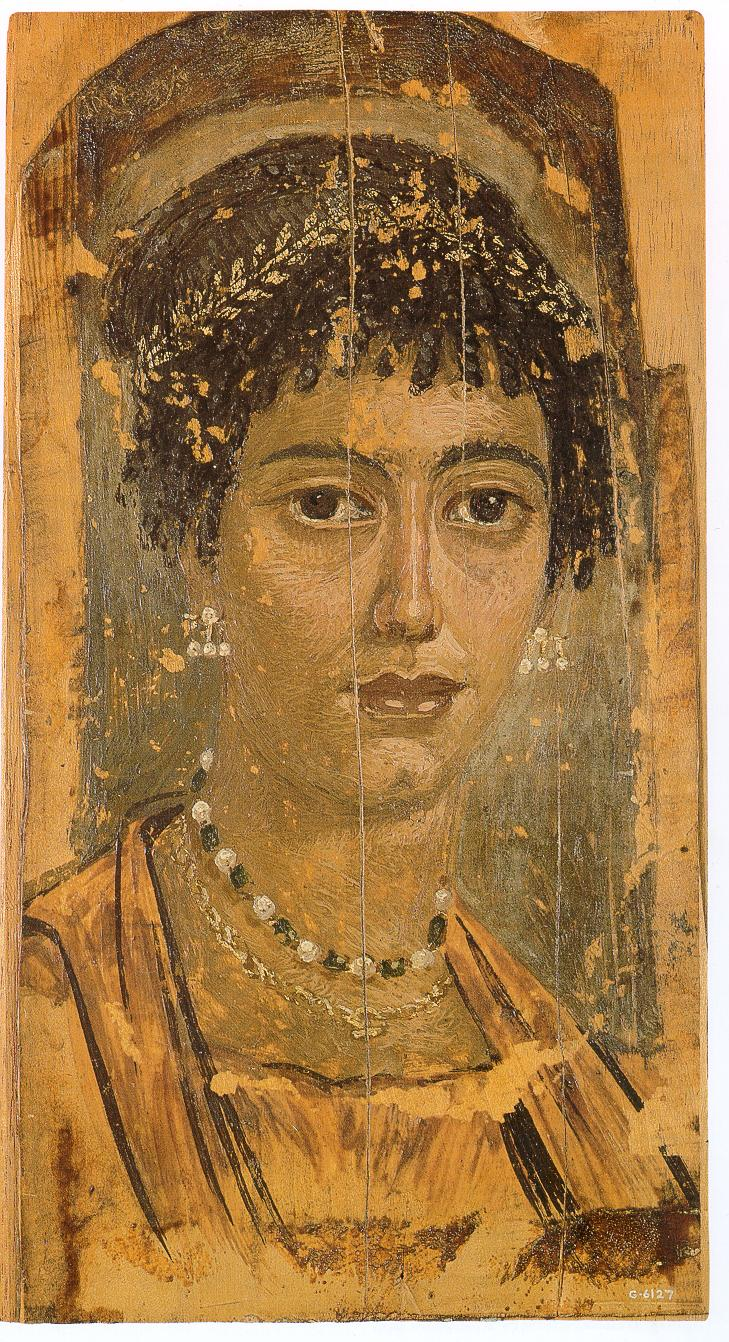
Mummy portrait from Hawara (100-110 CE)

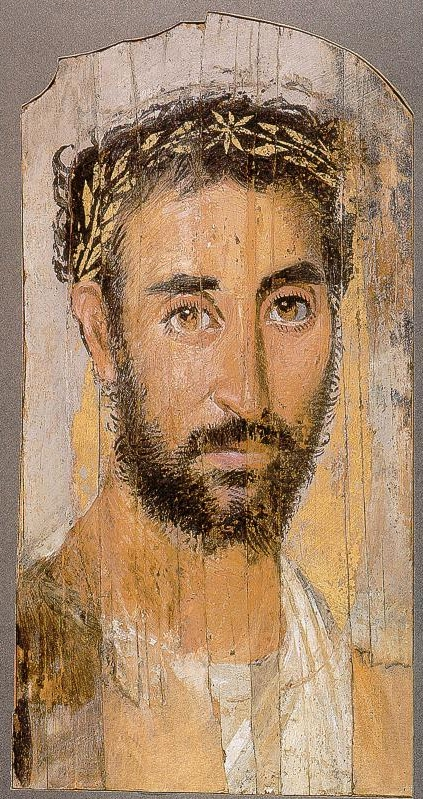
Crowned mummy portrait (2nd–3rd century CE)

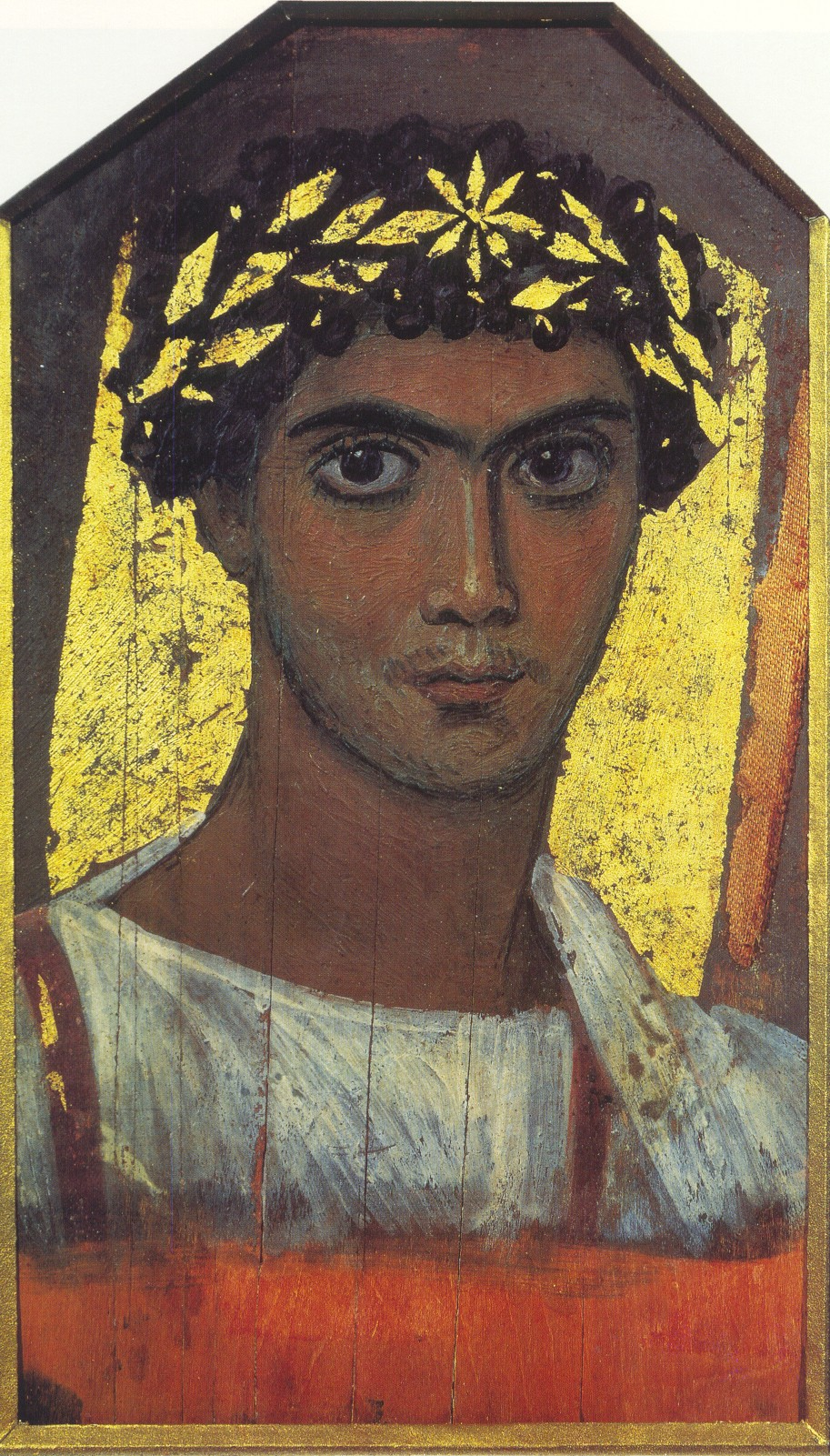
Mummy portrait of a young man with gilded crown

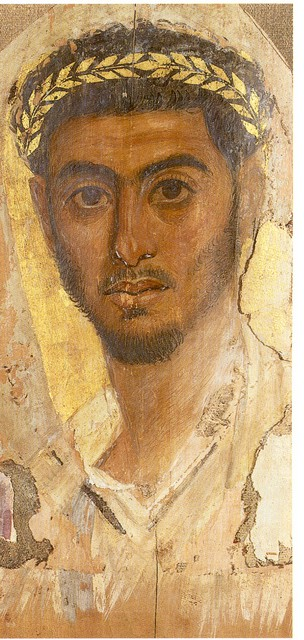
Fayum mummy portrait with the rhombus-shaped leaves representing laurel

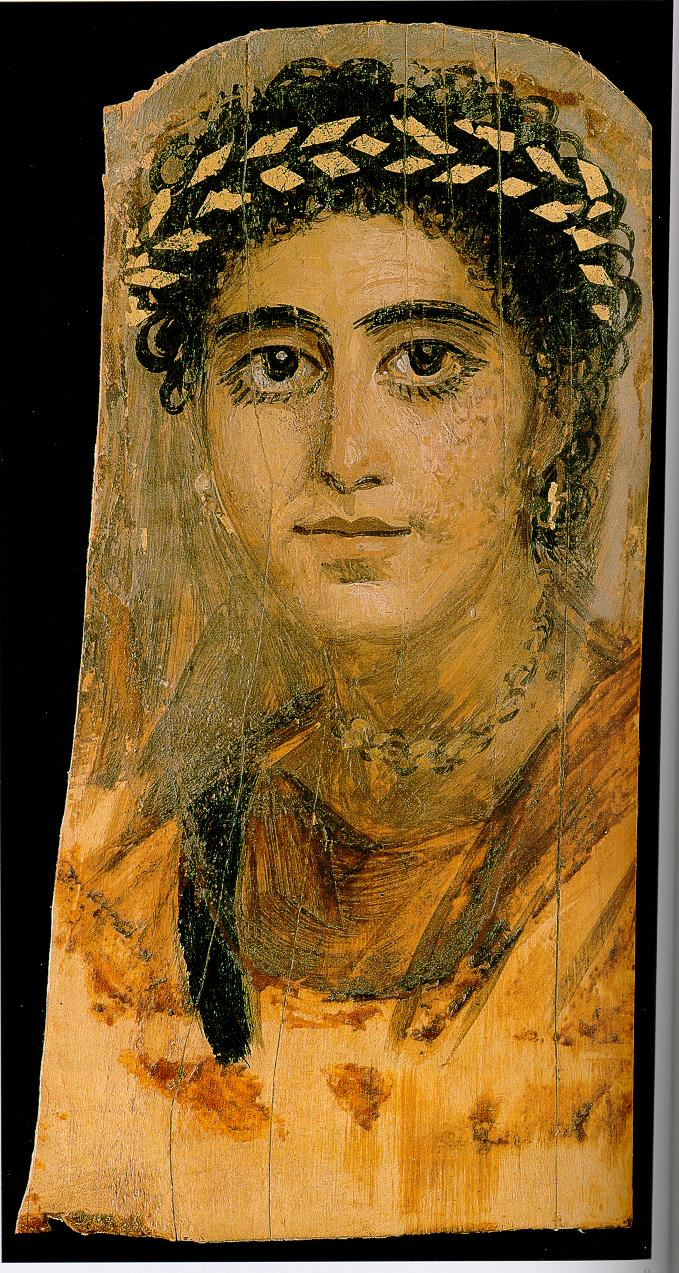
Young woman in red (90–120 CE)<ref>"Portrait of a young woman in red,"

== See also ==
- Crowns of Egypt
- Crown of Immortality
- Klila in Mandaeism
- Taga (Mandaeism)
