= Radiate crown =

Crown or other headgear symbolizing the Sun

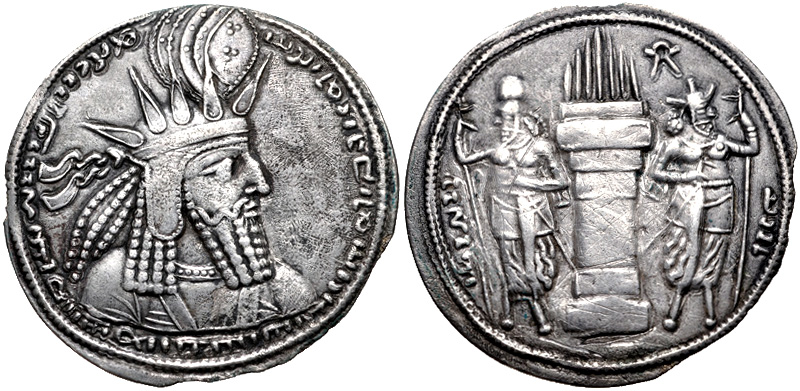
Coin of Bahram I of the Sassanian Empire (late 3rd century AD, Ctesiphon mint)

A radiant or radiate crown, also known as a solar crown, sun crown, Eastern crown, or tyrant's crown, is a crown, wreath, diadem, or other headgear symbolizing the Sun or more generally powers associated with the Sun. It comprises a number of narrowing bands going outwards from the wearer's head, to represent the rays of the Sun. These may be represented either as flat, on the same plane as the circlet of the crown, or rising at right angles to it.

== Egyptian ==
In the iconography of ancient Egypt, the solar crown is taken as a disc framed by the horns of a ram or cow. It is worn by deities such as Horus in his solar or hawk-headed form, Hathor, and Isis. It may also be worn by pharaohs.

In Ptolemaic Egypt, the solar crown could also be a radiate diadem, modeled after the type worn by Alexander the Great (as identified with the sun god Helios) in art from the mid-2nd century BC onward. It was perhaps influenced by contact with the Shunga Empire, and a Greco-Bactrian example is depicted at the great stupa of Bharhut. The first ruler of Egypt shown wearing this version of a solar crown was Ptolemy III Euergetes (246–222 BC).

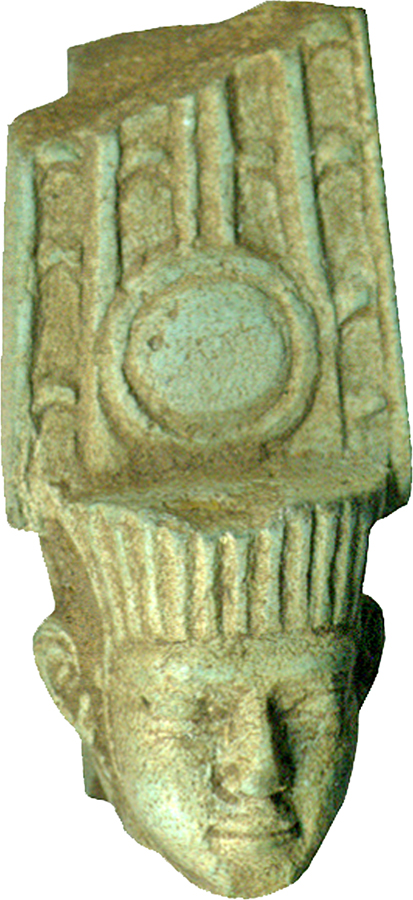
Amen-Re, wearing a tall feather crown and sun disk (715–664 BC)

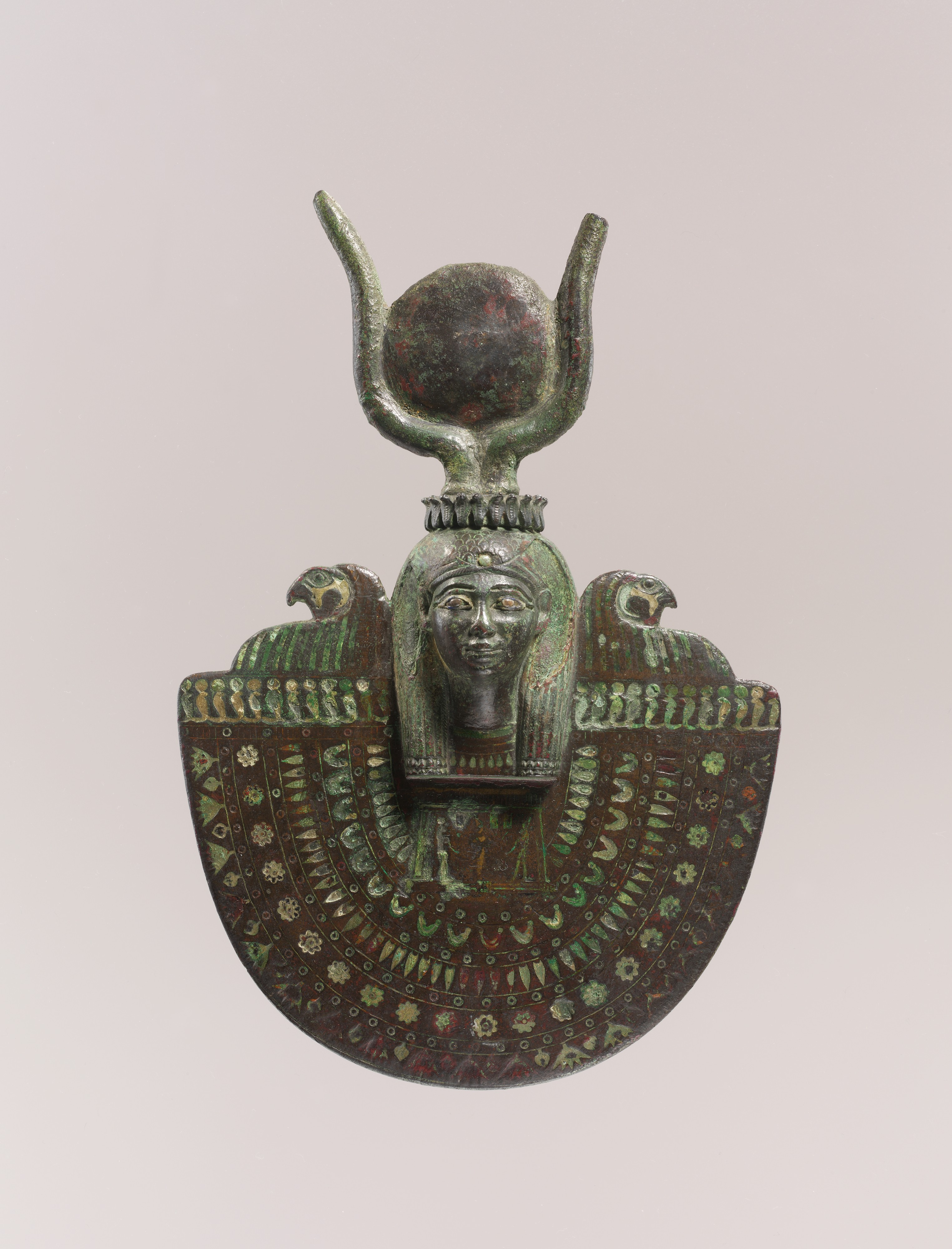
Egyptian aegis of Isis wearing solar crown (664–343 BC)

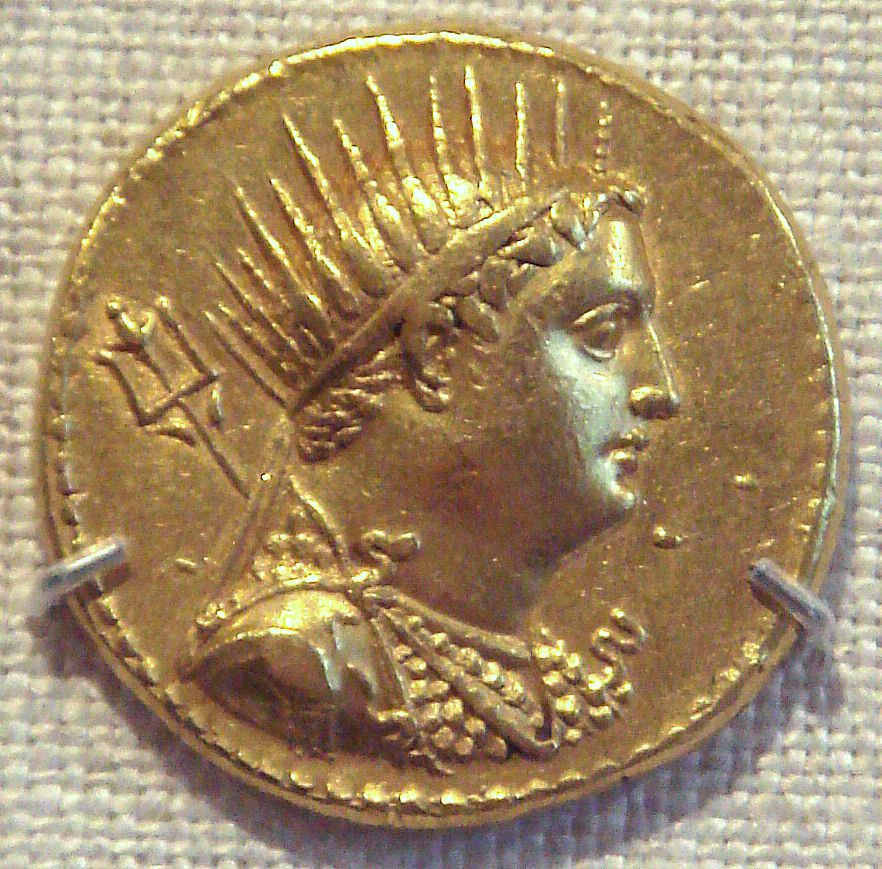
Coin of Ptolemy IV Philopator, depicting his deified father Ptolemy III (d. 222 BC)

== Solar crown of Helios ==
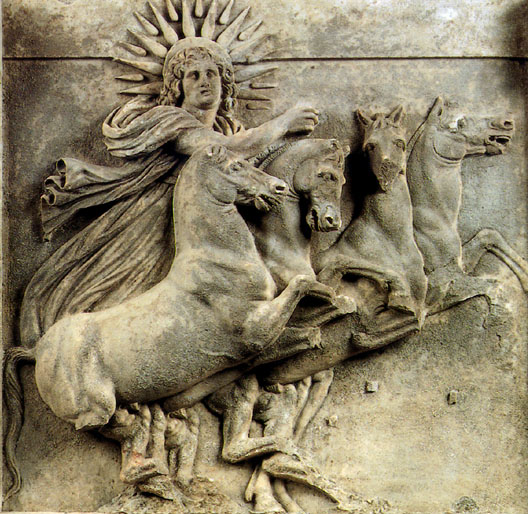
Helios in his chariot, early 4th century BC, Temple of Athena, Ilion

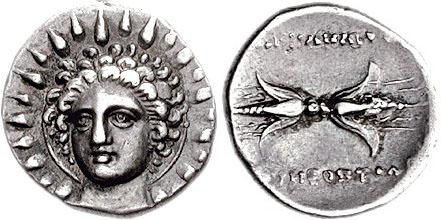
Coin issued by Alexander, King of Epirus (333–330 BC)

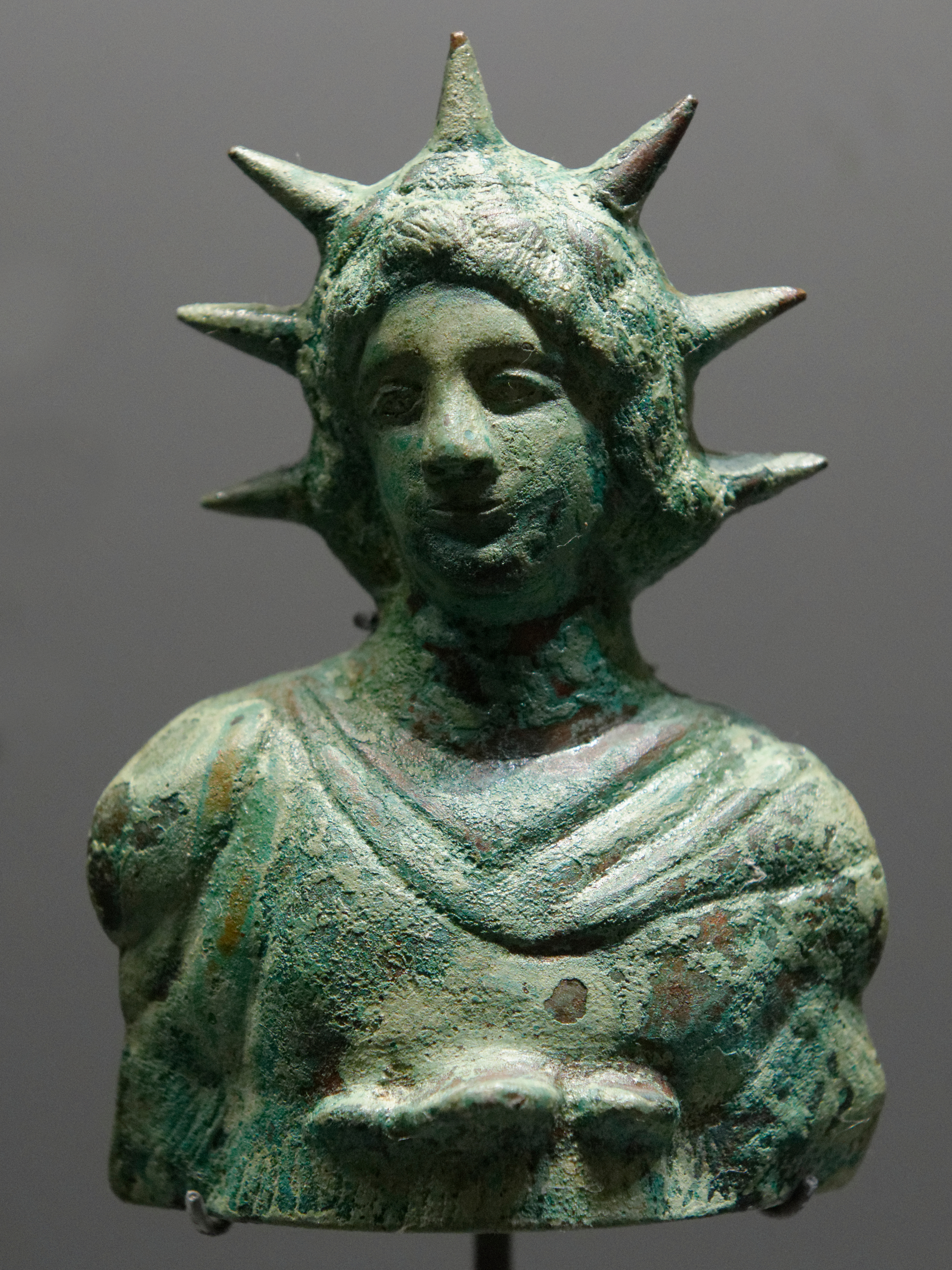
Helios wearing the chlamys (Tripoli, 1st century AD)

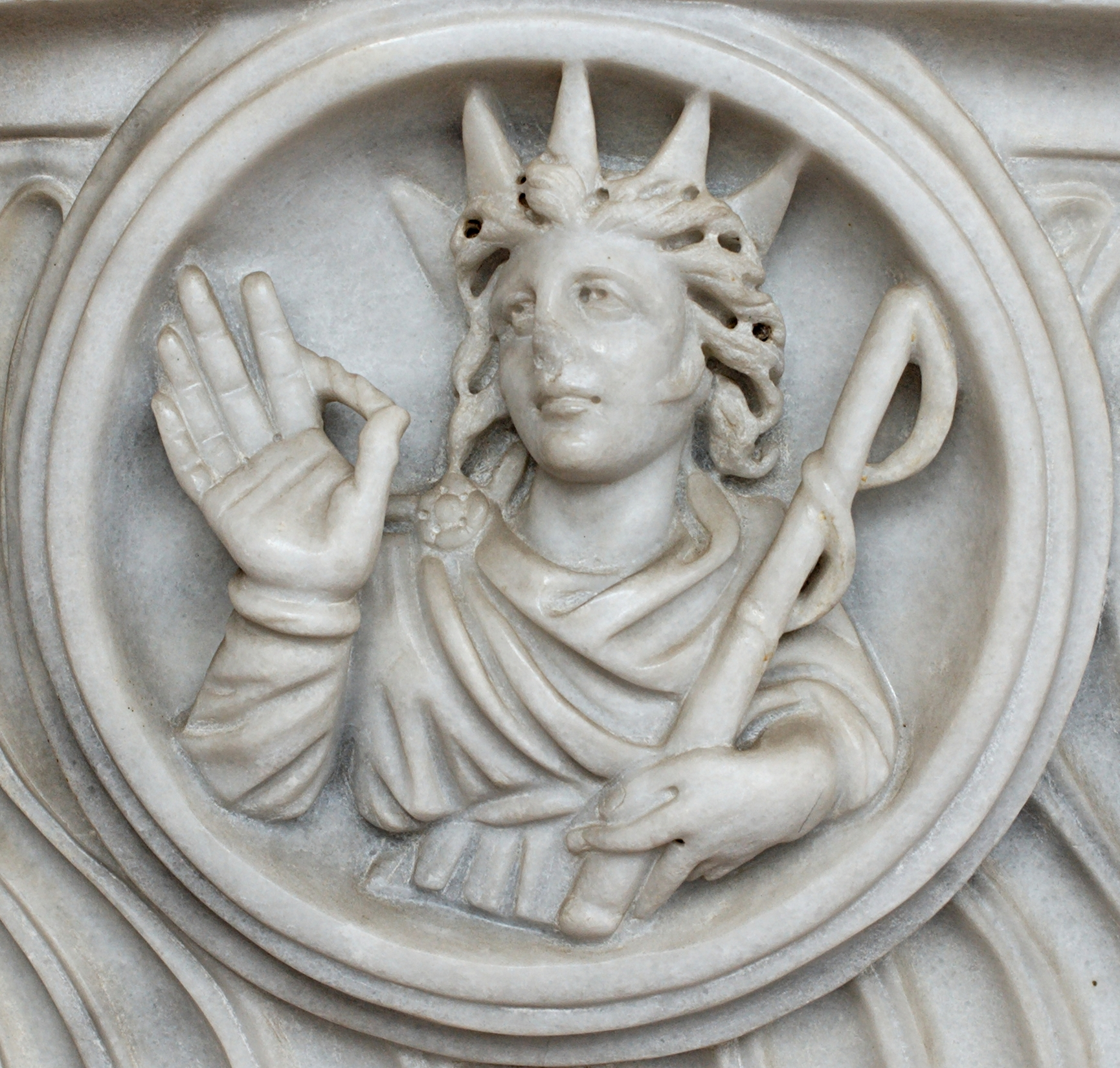
Helios in a clipeus, detail from a Roman sarcophagus, early 3rd century AD

== Roman Empire ==
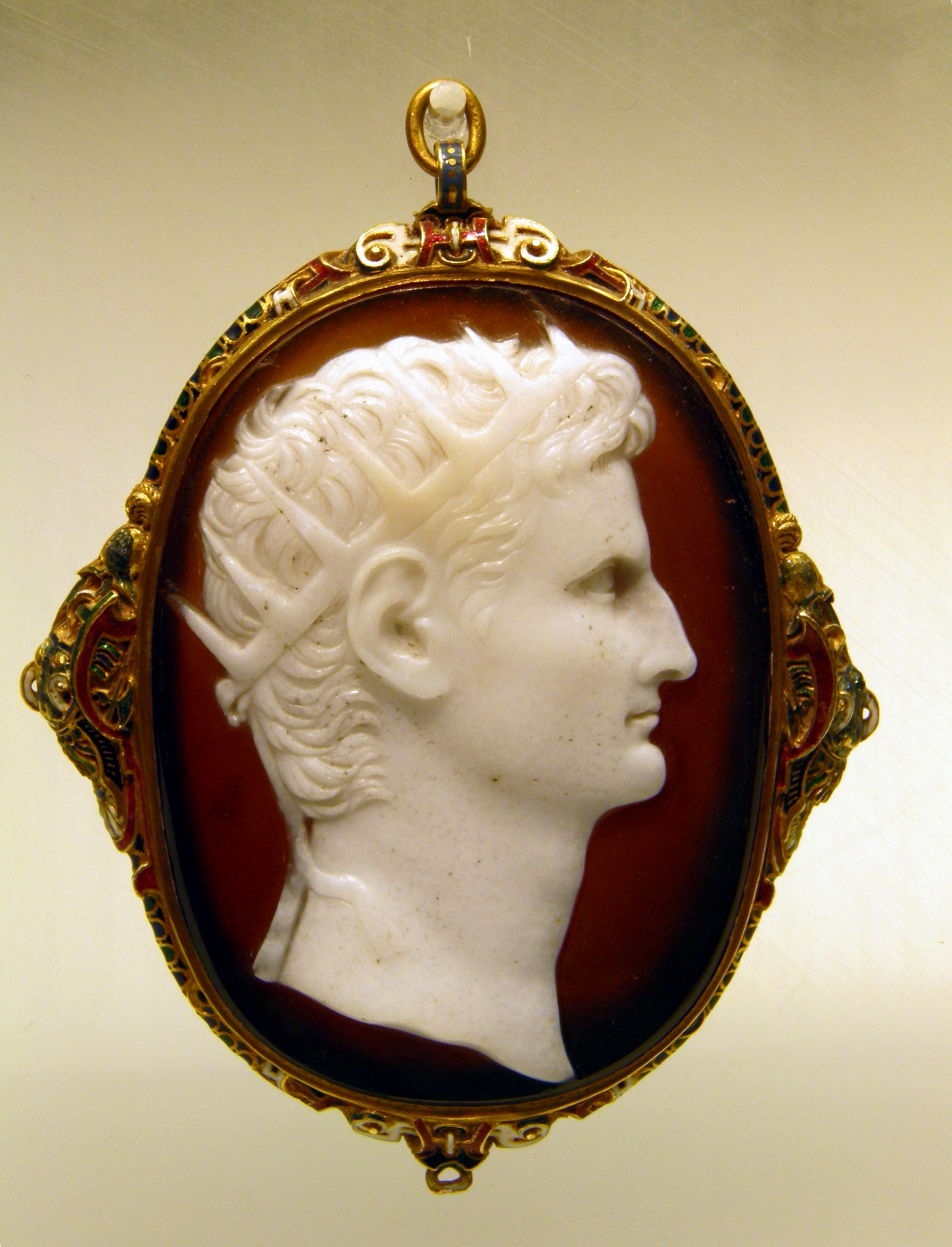
A cameo carving depicting the deified Augustus with the radiate crown of the sun god, 1st century AD

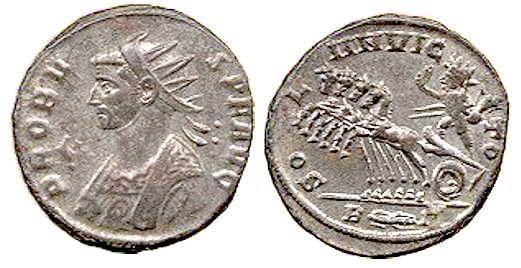
Coin of the Roman emperor Probus, circa 280: both Probus and Sol Invictus driving his chariot are wearing a radiate solar crown

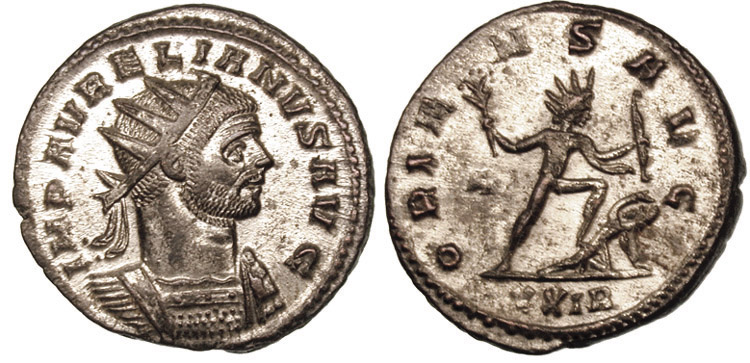
Coin of the Roman emperor Aurelian, 274-275: Aurelian and Sol Invictus are wearing a radiate crown

In the Roman Empire, the solar crown was worn by Roman emperors, especially in association with the cult of Sol Invictus, influenced also by radiate depictions of Alexander. Although a radiate crown is shown on Augustus in a posthumous coin issued after his deification, and on Nero on at least one coin while he was alive, it only became common, and sometimes usual, on coins in the 3rd century. Histories record that Gallienus, at least, wore an actual crown in public. The solar crown worn by Constantine, the first emperor to convert to Christianity, was reinterpreted as representing the "Holy Nails".

== Later use ==
From the Renaissance onward, the ancient Colossus of Rhodes, which was a statue of Helios, was often depicted with a radiate crown, although the statue's actual appearance is not known. The radiate crown became associated with Liberty personified, usually in a form of a circular disc with rays in different directions. The first appearance of Liberty in this guise may be in the Great Seal of France of 1848 and under subsequent French republics, and is best known from the Statue of Liberty (formally Liberty Enlightening the World), a gift from France to the United States of America.

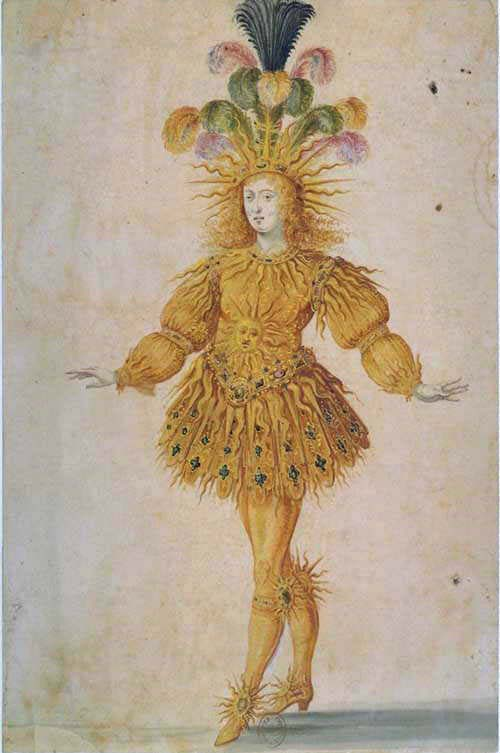
Ballet costume worn by Louis XIV of France, playing Apollo, 1653

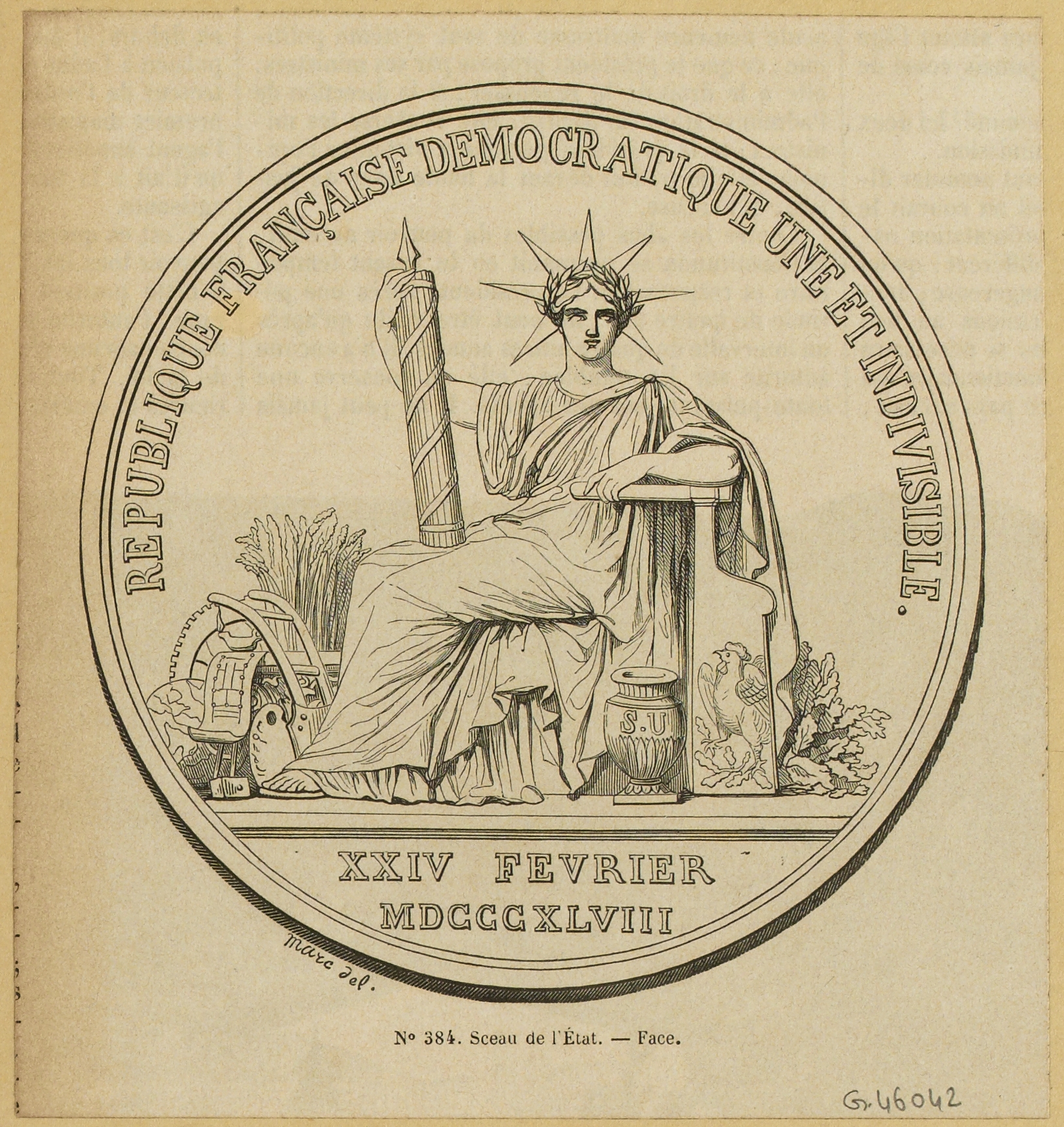
Great Seal of France (1848), lithograph

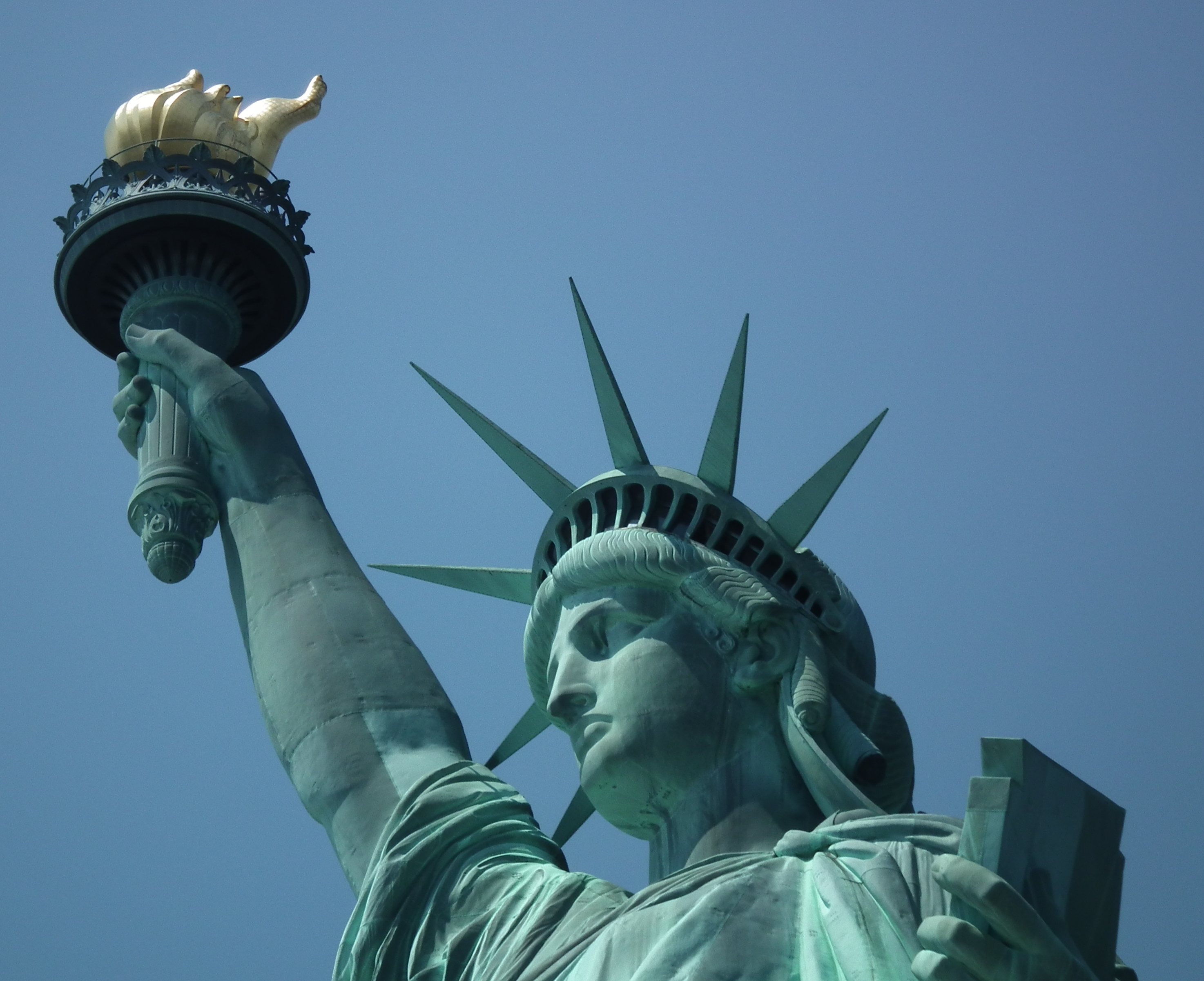
Liberty Enlightening the World, detail of the Statue of Liberty (1886)

== See also ==
- Crown of justification
- Crown of thorns
- Crowns of Egypt
- Halo
- Horned deity
- Taga in Mandaeism
- Liberty spikes, hairstyle based on the radiate crown of the Statue of Liberty
