= Shekhinah =

In Jewish theology, the dwelling or settling of the divine presence of God

Shekhinah (Hebrew: שְׁכִינָה, romanized: Šaḵīna or Šeḵīnā) is the romanization of a Hebrew word meaning "dwelling" or "settling". Shekhinah denotes the manifest divine presence of God and is an extensively discussed concept in the Talmud, philosophy, the Midrash, Hasidic thought, and Kabbalah in Judaism. Unlike other Hebrew terms for divinity that emphasize transcendence or sovereignty of God, Shekhinah uniquely conveys the immanent, relational aspect of the Divine as experienced within the world—particularly in communal, liturgical, or revelatory contexts, such as its accompaniment of the Israelites during the Babylonian captivity and its dwelling among individuals engaged in Torah study. According to the Bava Batra 25a:9–10 of the Talmud, Rabbi Ishmael and Rav Sheshet—two rabbis living the era of the Amoraim—taught that the Shekhinah dwells literally everywhere. The word shekhinah is found in the Hebrew Bible only as Shecaniah, a masculine proper name. The triliteral Hebrew root sh-k-n appears in numerous conjugations; it can be found 128 times.

== Etymology ==
The word shekhinah is first encountered in the rabbinic literature.

The Semitic root from which shekhinah is derived, š-k-n, means "to settle, inhabit, or dwell". In the verb form, it is often used to refer to the dwelling of a person or animal in a place, or to the dwelling of God. Nouns derived from the root included shachen ("neighbor") and mishkan (a dwelling-place, whether a secular home or a holy site such as the Tabernacle).

== In Judaism ==
In classic Jewish thought, the shekhinah refers to a dwelling or settling in a special sense, a dwelling or settling of divine presence, to the effect that, while in proximity to the shekhinah, the connection to God is more readily perceivable. While shekhinah is a feminine word in Hebrew, it primarily seemed to be featured in masculine or androgynous contexts referring to a divine manifestation of the presence of God, based especially on readings of the Talmud. Contemporary interpretations of the term shekhinah commonly see it as the divine feminine principle in Judaism.

=== Manifestation ===
The prophets made numerous references to visions of the presence of God, particularly in the context of the Tabernacle or Temple, with figures such as thrones or robes filling the Sanctuary.

The shekhinah is referred to as manifest in the Tabernacle and the Temple in Jerusalem throughout rabbinic literature.

It is also reported as being present in other contexts:

- While a person (or people) study Torah, the Shekhinah is among them.
- "Whenever ten are gathered for prayer, there the Shekhinah rests."
- "When three sit as judges, the Shekhinah is with them."
- Cases of personal need: "The Shekhinah dwells over the headside of the sick man's bed", "Wheresoever they were exiled, the Shekhinah went with them."
- "A man and woman - if they merit, the Shekhinah is between them. If not, fire consumes them." According to one interpretation of this source, the Shekhinah is the highest of six types of holy fire. When a married couple is worthy of this manifestation, all other types of fire are consumed by it.

The Talmud states that "the Shekhinah rests on man neither through gloom, nor through sloth, nor through frivolity, nor through levity, nor through talk, nor through idle chatter, but only through a matter of joy in connection with a mitzvah."

There is no occurrence of the word "shekhinah" in pre-rabbinic literature such as the Dead Sea Scrolls. It is only afterwards in the targums and rabbinic literature that the Hebrew term shekhinah, or Aramaic equivalent shekinta, is found, and then becomes extremely common. Martin McNamara (see notes) considers that the absence might lead to the conclusion that the term only originated after the destruction of the temple in 70 CE, but notes 2 Maccabees 14:35 "a temple for your habitation", where the Greek text (Koine Greek: ναὸν τῆς σῆς σκηνώσεως) suggests a possible parallel understanding, and where σκήνωσις skēnōsis "a tent-building", a variation on an early loanword from Phoenician (Ancient Greek: ἡ σκηνή skēnē "tent"), is deliberately used to represent the original Hebrew or Aramaic term.

=== Targum ===
In the Targum the addition of the noun term shekhinah paraphrases Hebrew verb phrases such as Exodus 34:9 "let the Lord go among us" (a verbal expression of presence) which Targum paraphrases with God's "shekhinah" (a noun form). In the post-temple era usage of the term shekhinah may provide a solution to the problem of God being omnipresent and thus not dwelling in any one place. In the Hebrew text of Exodus 33:20, as another example, Moses is told "You will not be able to see my face, for no human can see Me and live." Once again, using of the term shekhinah provides a solution to the corporeal idiom, so Targum Onkelos reads: "You will not be able to see the face of my shekhinah..."

=== Jewish prayers ===
The 17th blessing of the daily Amidah prayer concludes with the line "[Blessed are You, God,] who returns His Presence (shekhinato) to Zion" (הַמַּחֲזִיר שְׁכִינָתוֹ לְצִיּוֹן).

The Liberal Jewish prayer-book for Rosh Hashanah and Yom Kippur (Machzor Ruach Chadashah) contains a creative prayer based on Avinu Malkeinu, in which the feminine noun shekhinah is used in the interests of gender neutrality.

=== Relationship to the Holy Spirit ===
The concept of shekhinah is also associated with the concept of the Holy Spirit in Judaism (ruach ha-kodesh).

== Kabbalah ==
=== Sabbath Bride ===
The theme of the shekhinah as the Sabbath Bride recurs in the writings and songs of 16th century Kabbalist, Isaac Luria. The Azamer Bishvachin song, written in Aramaic by Luria (his name appears as an acrostic of each line) and sung at the evening meal of Shabbat is an example of this. The song appears in particular in many siddurs in the section following Friday night prayers and in some Shabbat song books:

Let us invite the Shechinah with a newly-laid table
and with a well-lit menorah that casts light on all heads.

Three preceding days to the right, three succeeding days to the left,
and amid them the Sabbath bride with adornments she goes, vessels and robes
...
May the Shechinah become a crown through the six loaves on each side
through the doubled-six may our table be bound with the profound Temple services

A paragraph in the Zohar starts: "One must prepare a comfortable seat with several cushions and embroidered covers, from all that is found in the house, like one who prepares a canopy for a bride. For the Shabbat is a queen and a bride. This is why the masters of the Mishna used to go out on the eve of Shabbat to receive her on the road, and used to say: "'Come, O bride, come, O bride!' And one must sing and rejoice at the table in her honor ... one must receive the Lady with many lighted candles, many enjoyments, beautiful clothes, and a house embellished with many fine appointments ..."

The tradition of the shekhinah as the Shabbat Bride, the Shabbat Kallah, continues to this day.

=== As feminine aspect ===
Kabbalah associates the shekhinah with the female. According to Gershom Scholem, "The introduction of this idea was one of the most important and lasting innovations of Kabbalism. ...no other element of Kabbalism won such a degree of popular approval." The "feminine Jewish divine presence, the shekhinah, distinguishes Kabbalistic literature from earlier Jewish literature."

"In the imagery of the Kabbalah the shekhinah is the most overtly female sefirah, the last of the ten sefirot, referred to imaginatively as 'the daughter of God'. ... The harmonious relationship between the female shekhinah and the six sefirot which precede her causes the world itself to be sustained by the flow of divine energy. She is like the moon reflecting the divine light into the world."

=== Nativity and life of Moses ===
The Zohar, a foundation book of kabbalah, presents the shekhinah as playing an essential role in the conception and birth of Moses. Later during the Exodus on the "third new moon" in the desert, "Shekhinah revealed Herself and rested upon him before the eyes of all."

=== The Tenth Sefirah ===
In Kabbalah, the shekhinah is identified with the tenth sefirah (Malkuth), and the source of life for humans on earth below the sefirotic realm. The Shekhinah is seen as the feminine divine presence of God descended to transform the world, Moses is considered to have risen to shekhinah into the sefirotic realm, and transcended the world as the bridegroom of the shekhinah.

== In Christianity ==
The concept is similar to that in the Gospel of Matthew 18:20, "Where two or three are gathered together in my name there am I in their midst." Some Christian theologians have connected the concept of shekhinah to the Greek term parousia, "presence" or "arrival," which is used in the New Testament in a similar way for "divine presence".

=== Branch Davidians ===
Lois Roden, whom the original Branch Davidian acknowledged as their teacher/prophet from 1978 to 1986, laid heavy emphasis on women's spirituality and the feminine aspect of God. She published a magazine, Shekinah, often rendered SHEkinah, in which she explored the concept that the shekhinah is the Holy Spirit. Articles from Shekinah are reprinted online at the Branch Davidian website.

== In Islam ==
=== In the Quran ===
Sakīnah (Arabic: سكينة) signifies the "presence or peace of God". As "support and reassurance" it was "sent by God into the hearts" of Muslims and Muhammad, according to John Esposito. A modern translator of the Quran, N. J. Dawood, states that "tranquility" is the English word for the Arabic meaning of sakīnah, yet it could be "an echo of the Hebrew shekeenah (the Holy Presence)." Another scholar states that the Arabic sakīnah derives from the Hebrew/Aramaic shekhinah. In the Quran, the Sakīnah is mentioned six times, in surah al-Baqara, at-Tawba and al-Fath.

Their prophet further told them, “The sign of Saul’s kingship is that the Ark will come to you—containing reassurance from your Lord and relics of the family of Moses and the family of Aaron, which will be carried by the angels. Surely in this is a sign for you, if you ˹truly˺ believe.”.

— Surah Al-Baqara 2:248

Sakīnah means "tranquility", "peace". "calm", from the Arabic root sakana: "to be quiet", "to abate", "to dwell". In Islam, Sakīnah "designates a special peace, the "Peace of God". Although related to Hebrew shekhinah, the spiritual state is not an "indwelling of the Divine Presence" The ordinary Arabic use of the word's root is "the sense of abiding or dwelling in a place". A story in Tafsir and Isra'iliyyat literature relates how Ibrahim and Isma'il, when looking for the spot to build the Kaaba found sakīnah. Newby writes that it was like a breeze "with a face that could talk", saying "build over me." "Associated with piety and moments of divine inspiration, sakinah in Islamic mysticism signifies an interior spiritual illumination."

=== Comments regarding Sakina ===
Sakina in the Quran can refer to God's blessing of solace and succour upon both the Children of Israel and Muhammad. Al-Qurtubi mentions in his exegesis, in explanation of the above-mentioned verse [2:248], that according to Wahb ibn Munabbih, sakinah is a spirit from God that speaks, and, in the case of the Israelites, where people disagreed on some issue, this spirit came to clarify the situation, and used to be a cause of victory for them in wars. According to Ali, "Sakinah is a sweet breeze/wind, whose face is like the face of a human". Mujahid mentions that "when Sakinah glanced at an enemy, they were defeated", and ibn Atiyyah mentions about the Ark of the Covenant (at-Tabut), to which the sakina was associated, that souls found therein peace, warmth, companionship and strength. According to Al-Tabari, the Shekhinah is a "gale-force wind with two heads" which Allah sent to guide Abraham to the building site of the Kaaba.

== In Gnosticism ==
Shekhinah, often in plural, is also present in some gnostic writings written in Aramaic, such as the writings of the Manichaeans and the Mandaeans, as well as others. In these writings, shekinas are described as hidden aspects of God, somewhat resembling the Amahrāspandan of the Zoroastrians.

In Mandaeism, a škina (Classical Mandaic: ࡔࡊࡉࡍࡀ) is a celestial dwelling where uthra, or benevolent celestial beings, live in the World of Light (alma d-nhūra). In Mandaean priest initiation ceremonies, a škina refers to an initiation hut where a novice and his initiator stay for seven days without sleeping. The hut is called a škina since priests are considered to be the earthly manifestations of uthras, and the initiation hut represents the abode of the uthra on earth.

== Anthropological views ==
=== Raphael Patai ===
In the work by anthropologist Raphael Patai entitled The Hebrew Goddess, the author argues that the term shekhinah refers to a goddess by comparing and contrasting scriptural and medieval Jewish Kabbalistic source materials. Patai draws a historic distinction between the shekhinah and the Matronit. In his book Patai also discusses the Hebrew goddesses Asherah and Anat-Yahu.

=== Gustav Davidson ===
American poet Gustav Davidson listed shekhinah as an entry in his reference work A Dictionary of Angels, Including the Fallen Angels (1967), stating that she is the female incarnation of Metatron.

== See also ==
- Andiruna in Mandaeism
- The Hebrew Goddess
- Holy Spirit in Judaism
- Priestly Blessing
- Shkinta in Mandaeism
- Ein Sof
