= Klila =

Mandaean ritual myrtle wreath or ring

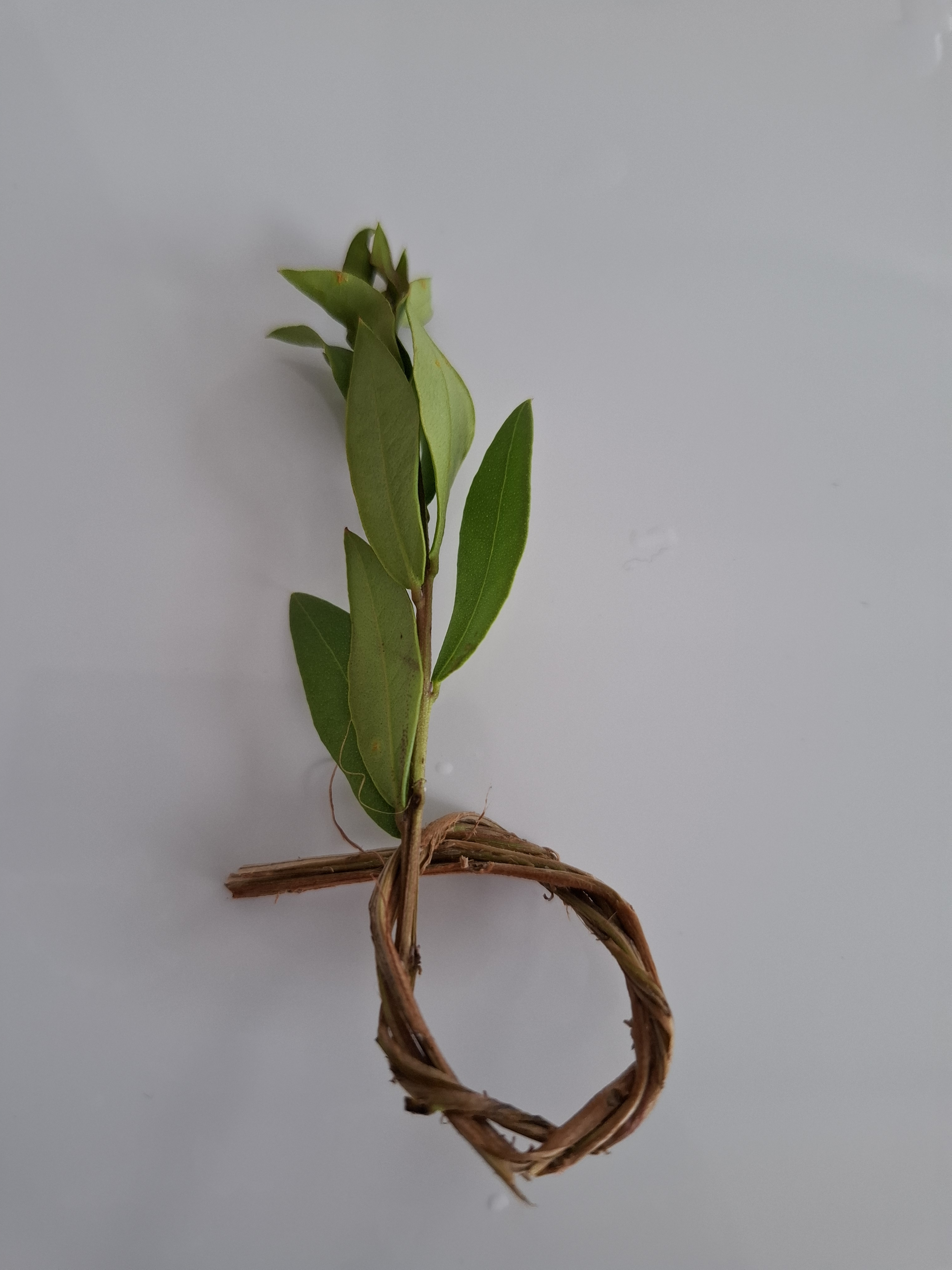
A klila is made of a myrtle twig that is split in half and then intertwined. It is worn on the right little finger.

In Mandaeism, the klila (Classical Mandaic: ࡊࡋࡉࡋࡀ, Modern Mandaic pronunciation: [kəˈlilæ]) is a small myrtle (Classical Mandaic: ࡀࡎࡀ, romanized: asa) wreath or ring (translated as "circlet" by E. S. Drower) used during Mandaean religious rituals. The klila is a female symbol that complements the taga, a white crown which always takes on masculine symbolism.

The klila is used to adorn the drabsha, a wooden cross covered with a white cloth that is the main symbol of Mandaeism.

== Description ==
The klila that is used for wearing on the right little finger is made by splitting a young myrtle twig with leaves in half, and then intertwining the two split halves to make a ring that can fit around the finger.

== Use in rituals ==
The klila is used during most Mandaean rituals, including masbuta, masiqta, and priest initiation rituals.

== In the Qulasta ==
Several prayers in the Qulasta are recited when consecrating and putting on the klila, including prayers 19, 46, 47, 61, and 79.

In E. S. Drower's version of the Qulasta, prayers 305-329 are recited for the klila, as well as for the taga.

Hazazban (or Haza-Zban) is mentioned in Qulasta prayers 19 and 27 as an uthra who sets wreaths (klila) upon the heads of Mandaeans who are performing masbuta.

== Syriac parallels ==
In the Syriac Peshitta, the word klīlā (Classical Syriac: ܟܠܝܠܐ, lit. 'wreath') is used to refer to Jesus' crown of thorns in the Gospels. In contrast, tāḡā (Classical Syriac: ܬܓܐ, lit. 'diadem'), cognate with Mandaic taga, is used to refer to heavenly crowns in the Book of Revelation.

== See also ==
- Drabsha
- Laurel wreath
- Olive wreath
- Crown of justification
- Tamagushi – Shinto tree branch offering
