= Taga (Mandaeism) =

Crown used during Mandaean religious rituals

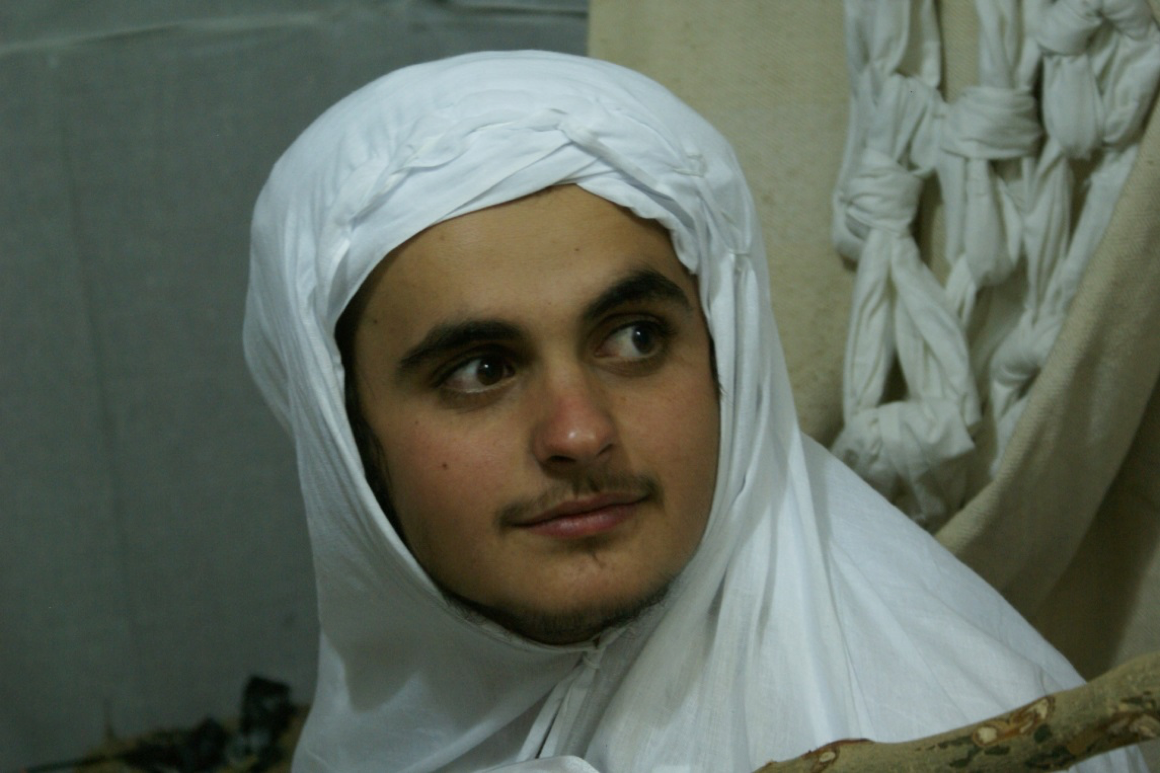
Several tagas can be seen on the right in this 2008 photograph of a tarmida initiation ceremony in Baghdad.

In Mandaeism, the taga (Classical Mandaic: ࡕࡀࡂࡀ; sometimes also spelled taqa ࡕࡀࡒࡀ) is a white crown traditionally made of silk that is used during Mandaean religious rituals. The taga is a white crown which always takes on masculine symbolism, while the klila (myrtle wreath) is a feminine symbol that complements the taga. It is a borrowing from Middle Persian 𐭲𐭠𐭢 (tāg).

== Use in rituals ==
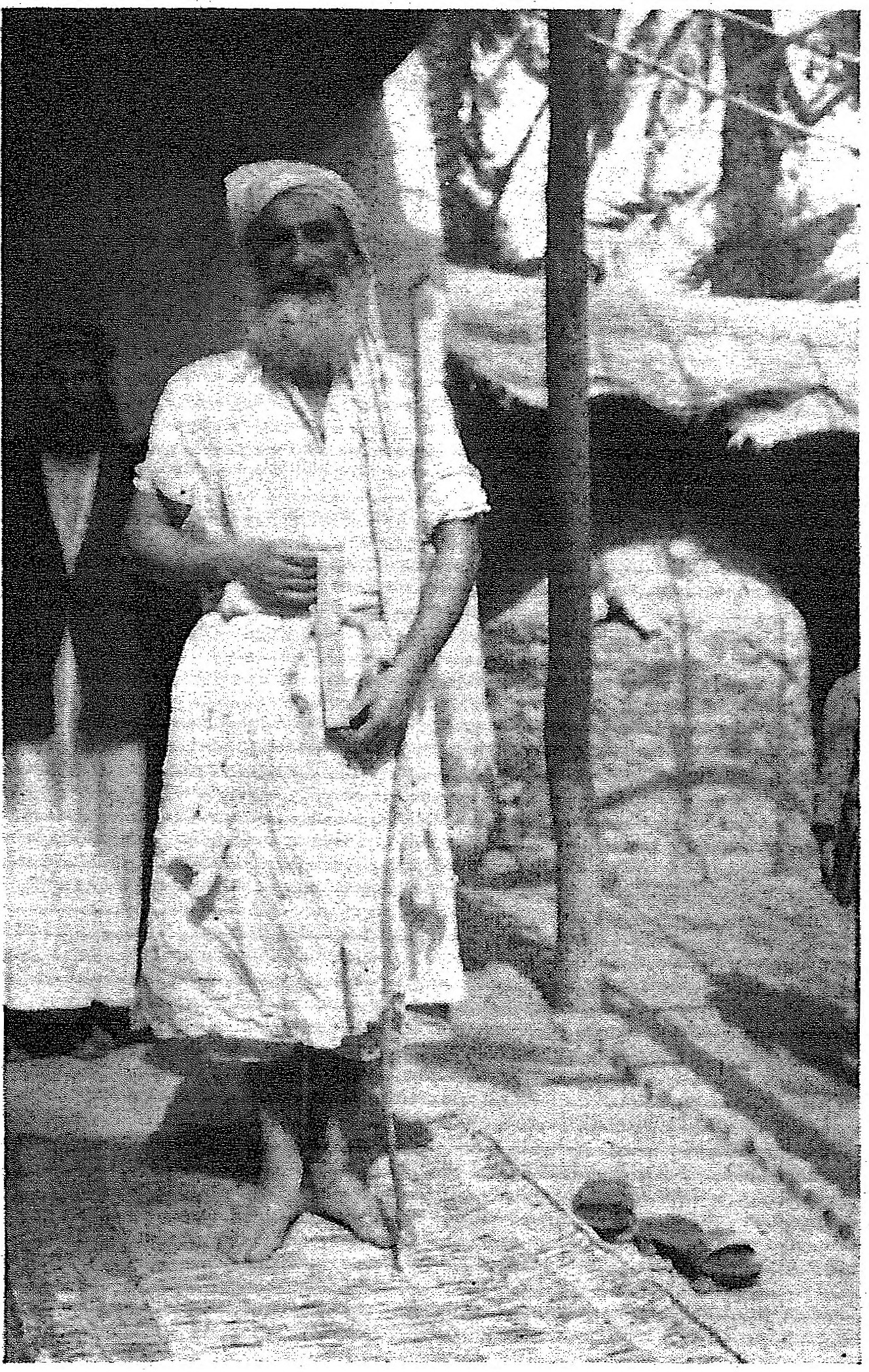
A Mandaean priest holding a taga with both hands during the 1930s in southern Iraq

Along with the klila, the taga is used during most Mandaean rituals, including masbuta, masiqta, and priest initiation rituals.

When praying with the taga, Mandaean priests often hold the taga in front of the face and repeatedly move it in a V shape back and forth. This is done in a pendulum-like manner, as he kisses the taga and moves it from his lips to his right eye, then back to his lips and then to his left eye, alternating repeatedly between the two eyes. In some cases, this is repeated for a total of 61 times.

== In the Qulasta ==
Several prayers in the Qulasta are recited when consecrating and putting on the taga. Prayers 305–329 are the "coronation prayers", recited when a new priest is crowned with the taga during the priestly initiation ceremony. The first seven of these prayers (305–311) are the seven hymns of Shishlam Rabba, and the following seven prayers (312–318) are the responses to those antiphonal hymns.

== See also ==
- Radiate crown
- Drabsha
- Klila
- Rasta (Mandaeism)
