= Danny Siegel =

American Jewish fundraiser & writer

Danny Siegel is an American Jewish fundraiser, poet, author, and lecturer on philanthropy, Tzedakah, and Jewish values.

== Biography ==
Siegel founded the Ziv Tzedakah Fund in 1981 after making several trips to Israel carrying money to be distributed to those in need. Jewish tradition teaches that anyone on a mission of good deeds will be saved from harm, and so, on each trip, Siegel followed this age-old custom and asked friends and relatives for a dollar or two to give away to Tzedakah upon his arrival in the Holy Land.

Once in Israel, Siegel went in search of "the Good People" (he refers to them as "Mitzvah Heroes"), ordinary Israelis who were doing extraordinary work, simply by trying to make the world a better place. Within a short time, he learned of the efforts of such people as Hadassah Levi, who made her life's work the rescue of abandoned babies with Down syndrome from hospitals, Myriam Mendilow, who found Jerusalem's poor, elderly residents on the streets of the city and gave them respect and new purpose in her program, Yad L'Kashish (Lifeline for the Old), or Uri Lupolianski, a young teacher who started Israel's now famous lending program, Yad Sarah, in his living room.

He has found these "Mitzvah heroes" in countless places around the world, not just Israel. He has stated he "wants to turn ordinary people into superheroes".

Siegel works with over 100 such altruists around the world. He "has a stable of everyday, real-life Mitzvah heroes, young and old, with projects ranging from the ordinary to the unusual".

After returning from his first trip, Siegel issued a four-page report to all of his donors in which he described all of the places that he had distributed their Tzedakah money. From that first $955 Siegel collected and gave away, Ziv Tzedakah Fund grew to be an organization that in 2007 completed its 32nd year of operation and distributed more than $14,000,000 primarily to small programs and projects in both Israel and the United States. (In 2006, over $2,000,000 was given away to people in need; and the same for 2007–8). Siegel closed the Fund in December 2008. Siegel influenced thousands of people with his unique tzedakah and mitzvah philosophy. With the closing of Ziv Tzedakah Fund in 2008, Siegel identified several other organizations in his final report to donors. All of these groups operate in a similar manner as Ziv and they include Hands on Tzedakah which continues Siegel's long-standing tradition of employing someone in Israel, on the ground, choosing Arnie Draiman as the Director for Israel Projects. Draiman worked for Siegel for over 20 years and continues to work closely with him today); KAVOD, Tzedakah Fund, Inc., To Save A Life Foundation and The Good People Fund. His approach to Tzedakah "offers a no frills, no red tape way to help those in need", according to the San Diego Jewish Journal.

Siegel has a B.S. in Comparative Literature from Columbia University's School of General Studies, and a Bachelor's and Master's of Hebrew Literature from the Jewish Theological Seminary of America.

He is one of three recipients of the prestigious 1993 Covenant Award for Exceptional Jewish Educators.

== Literary career ==
Siegel is the author of 29 books on such topics as practical and personalized giving, healing and humor, and has produced an anthology of 500 selections of Biblical and Talmudic quotes about living life called Where Heaven and Earth Touch. Siegel is also a poet and several of his published books are poetry.

In 2020, the Jewish Publication Society published an anthology of Siegel's writings, Radiance: Creative Mitzvah Living, The Selected Prose and Poetry of Danny Siegel, edited by Rabbi Neal Gold and with a foreword by Rabbi Joseph Telushkin.

== Published works ==
=== Tzedakah, Mitzvahs, Tikkun Olam, and Jewish Values ===
- Angels, 1980
- Gym Shoes and Irises: Personalized Tzedakah, 1981
- Gym Shoes and Irises: Book Two, 1987, ISBN 0-940653-03-6
- Munbaz II and Other Mitzvah Heroes, 1988, ISBN 0-940653-13-3
- Family Reunion: Making Peace in the Jewish Community, 1989, ISBN 0-940653-24-9
- Mitzvahs, 1990, ISBN 0-940653-26-5
- After the Rain, 1993, ISBN 0-940653-35-4
- Good People, 1995, ISBN 978-0-940653-40-5
- Heroes and Miracle Workers 1997, ISBN 0-940653-43-5
- 1 + 1 = 3 and 37 Other Mitzvah Principles For a Meaningful Life 2000, ISBN 0-940653-46-X
- Danny Siegel’s Bar and Bat Mitzvah Mitzvah Book: A Practical Guide For Changing the World Through Your Simcha, 2004, ISBN 0-940653-47-8
- Who, Me? Yes, You! — Danny Siegel’s Workbook to Help You Decide Where, When, Why, and How You Can Do Your Best Tikkun Olam, 2006, ISBN 0-940653-50-8
- Giving Your Money Away, How Much, How to, Where, and To Whom, 2006, ISBN 0-940653-51-6

=== For Children ===
- The Humongous Pushka in the Sky, 1993, ISBN 0-940653-36-2
- Tell Me a Mitzvah (Children's stories, Kar‑Ben Copies, Inc.), 1993, ISBN 0-929371-78-X
- Mitzvah Magic: What Kids Can Do to Change the World (Kar‑Ben/Lerner), 2002, ISBN 1-58013-034-8

=== Midrash and Halachah ===
- Where Heaven and Earth Touch: An Anthology of Midrash and Halachah; Book One, 1983; Large Print Edition, 1985, Book Two, 1984, Book Three, 1985
- Where Heaven and Earth Touch: Combined Books One‑Three, 1988, ISBN 0-940653-09-5
- Where Heaven and Earth Touch: Hardback edition, 1989; Soft cover, 1995 (Jason Aronson publishers), ISBN 978-0-87668-864-9
- Source Book: Selected Hebrew and Aramaic Sources, 1985

=== Poetry ===
- From the Heart, 2012
- Soulstoned, 1969
- And God Braided Eveʹs Hair, 1976
- Between Dust and Dance (with prose), 1978
- Nine Entered Paradise Alive, 1980
- Unlocked Doors: The Selected Poems of Danny Siegel 1969‑1983, 1983
- The Lord Is A Whisper at Midnight: Psalms and Prayers, 1985
- The Garden, Where Wolves and Lions Do No Harm to the Sheep and Deer, 1985
- Before Our Very Eyes: Readings for a Journey Through Israel, 1986
- The Meadow Beyond the Meadow, 1991, ISBN 0-940653-30-3
- Hearing Heart, 1992, ISBN 0-940653-33-8

=== Healing ===
- Healing: Readings and Meditations, 1999, ISBN 978-0-940653-45-0

=== Humor ===
- The Unorthodox Book of Jewish Records and Lists (co‑authored with Allan Gould), 1982, ISBN 978-0-88830-222-9

=== Anthology ===
- Radiance: Creative Mitzvah Living (edited by Rabbi Neal Gold), 2020, ISBN 978-0827615021
