= Tzedakah =

Religious obligation in Judaism to do what is right and just

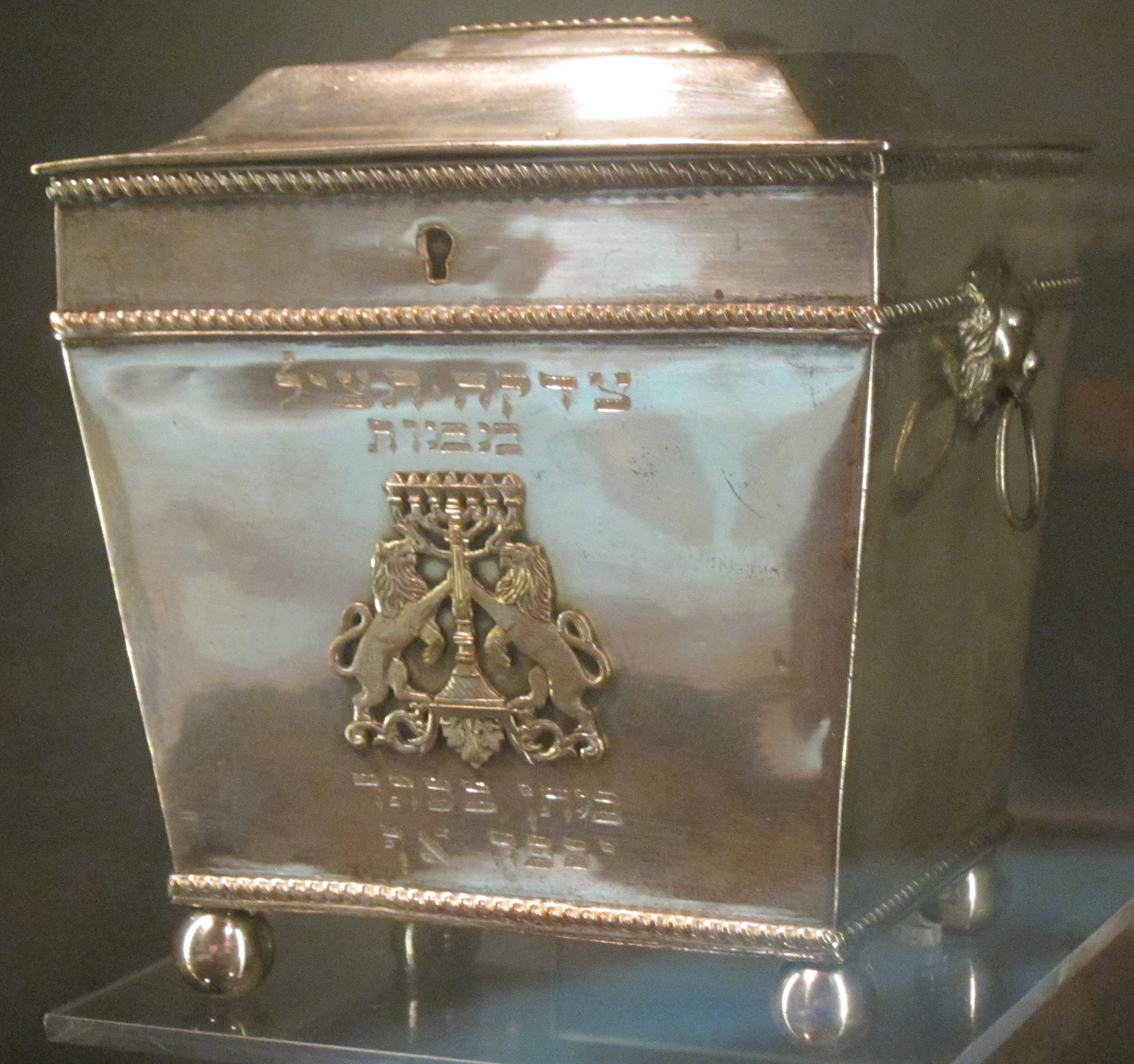
Tzedakah box (Pushke), Charleston, 1820, silver, National Museum of American Jewish History

Tzedakah (Hebrew: צְדָקָה ṣədāqā, [ts(e)daˈka]) is a Hebrew word meaning "righteousness", but commonly used to signify charity. This concept of "charity" differs from the modern Western understanding of "charity". The latter is typically understood as a spontaneous act of goodwill and a marker of generosity; tzedakah is an ethical obligation, and it is not properly "charity", as with Christendom, but a way to empower poor people to support themselves, helping them in developing their talents and skills. The Medieval Jewish philosopher Maimonides as well as the 16th century Jewish legal scholar Joseph Caro dedicated sections of their books on Jewish law (respectively, The Code of Maimonides and Shulchan Arukh) to discussions of charity, indicating the importance of this particular mitzvah to Jewish faith practices and tradition.

Tzedakah (Tzedaka) refers to the religious obligation to do what is right and just, which Judaism emphasizes as an important part of living a spiritual life. Unlike voluntary philanthropy, tzedakah is seen as a religious obligation that must be performed regardless of one's financial standing, and so is mandatory even for those of limited financial means. Tzedakah is considered to be one of the three main acts that can positively influence an unfavorable heavenly decree.

The word tzedakah is based on the Hebrew (צדק, Tzedeq), meaning righteousness, fairness, or justice, and is related to the Hebrew word Tzadik, meaning righteous as an adjective (or righteous individual as a noun in the form of a substantive). Although the word appears 157 times in the Masoretic Text of the Hebrew Bible, typically in relation to "righteousness" per se, its use as a term for "charity" in the above sense is an adaptation of Rabbinic Judaism in Talmudic times.

In the Middle Ages, Maimonides conceived of an eight-level hierarchy of tzedakah, where the highest form is to give a gift, loan, or partnership that will result in the recipient becoming self-sufficient instead of living upon others. In his view, the second highest form of tzedakah is to give donations anonymously to unknown recipients.

== Precedents in ancient Israel ==
The Hebrew Bible teaches the obligation to aid those in need, but does not employ one single term for this obligation. The term tzedakah occurs 157 times in the Masoretic Text, typically in relation to "righteousness" per se, usually in the singular, but sometimes in the plural tzedekot, in relation to acts of charity. In the Septuagint this was sometimes translated as eleemosyne, "almsgiving".

Today, however, it is evident that it is not very correct to use some expressions such as "charity" or "alms", it is not always accepted, in fact even parents have the duty to give to their children and this is considered Tzedakah, also thanks to the abundance of products and money in most of cases.

== In rabbinical literature of the classical and Middle Ages ==
In classical rabbinical literature, it was argued that the Biblical regulations concerning left-overs only applied to cereal grain fields, orchards, and vineyards, and not to vegetable gardens. The classical rabbinical writers were much stricter as to who could receive the remains. It was stated that the farmer was not permitted to benefit from the gleanings, and was not permitted to discriminate among the poor, nor try to frighten them away with dogs or lions (Hullin 131a, Pe'ah 5:6). The farmer was not even allowed to help one of the poor to gather the left-overs. However, it was also argued that the law was only applicable in Canaan (Jerusalem Talmud. Pe'ah 2:5), although many classical rabbinical writers who were based in Babylon observed the laws there (Hullin 134b). It was also seen as only applying to Jewish paupers, but poor non-Jews were allowed to benefit for the sake of civil peace.

Maimonides is known for enumerating Eight Levels of Giving (where the first level is most preferable, and the eighth the least):

1. Giving an interest-free loan to a person in need; forming a partnership with a person in need; giving a grant to a person in need; finding a job for a person in need, so long as that loan, grant, partnership, or job results in the person no longer living by relying upon others.
2. Giving tzedakah anonymously to an unknown recipient via a person or public fund that is trustworthy, wise, and can perform acts of tzedakah with your money in a most impeccable fashion.
3. Giving tzedakah anonymously to a known recipient.
4. Giving tzedakah publicly to an unknown recipient.
5. Giving tzedakah before being asked.
6. Giving adequately after being asked.
7. Giving willingly, but inadequately.
8. Giving "in sadness" (giving out of pity): It is thought that Maimonides was referring to giving because of the sad feelings one might have in seeing people in need (as opposed to giving because it is a religious obligation). Other translations say "giving unwillingly".

== In practice ==
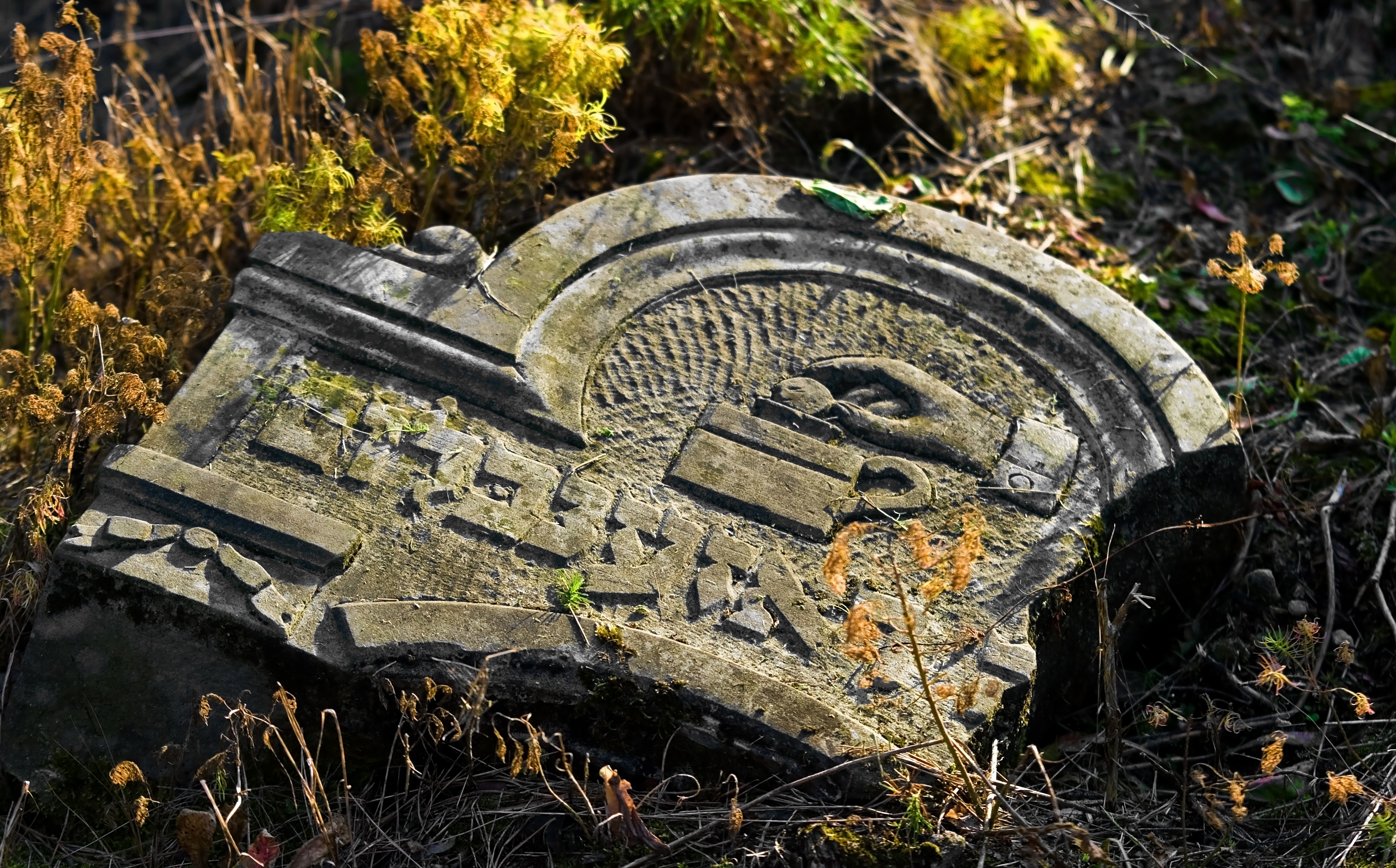
Tzedakah motif on a Jewish gravestone. Jewish cemetery in Otwock (Karczew-Anielin).

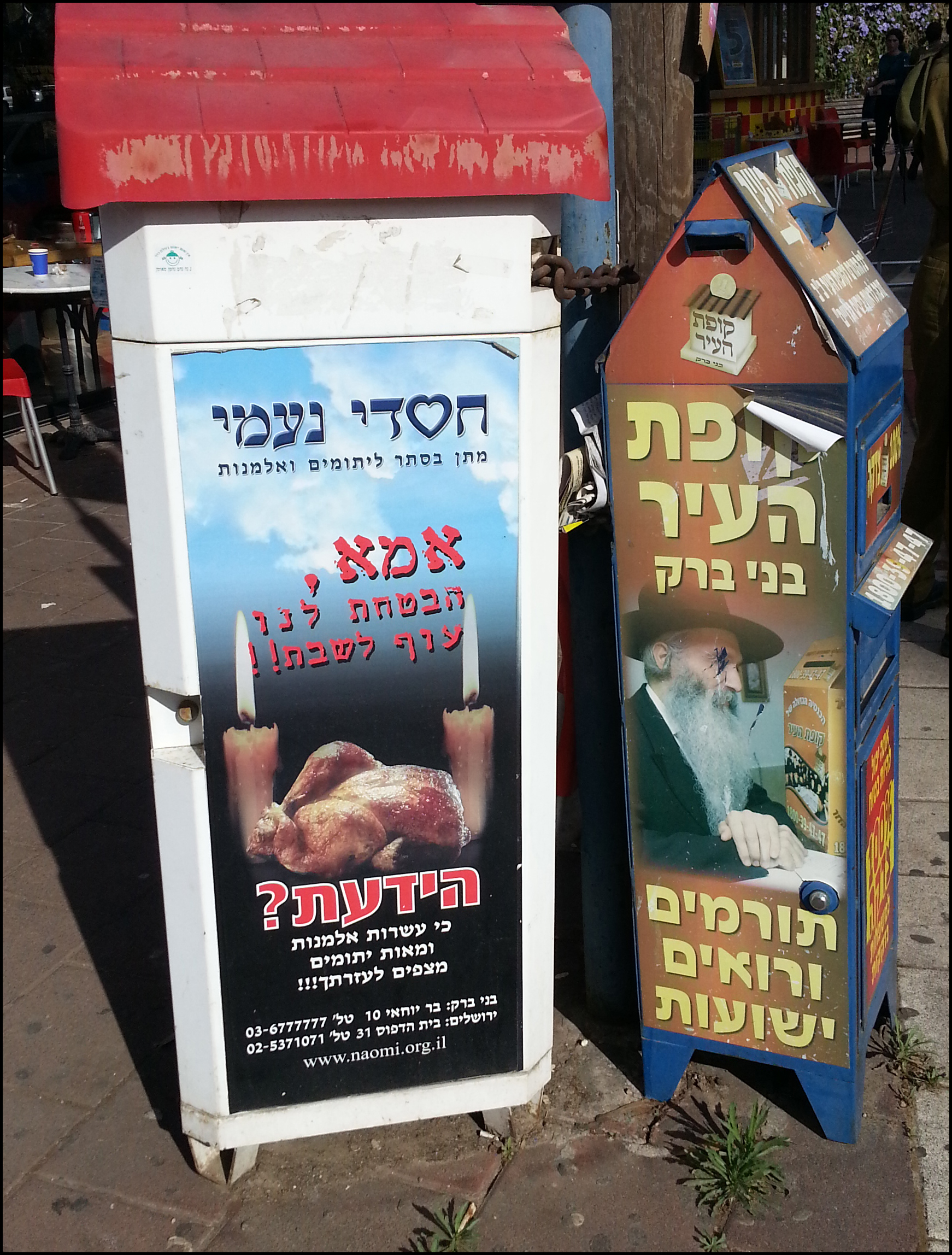
Puskhes in Bnei Brak, Israel

In practice, most Jews carry out tzedakah by donating a portion of their income to charitable institutions, or to needy people they may encounter. The perception among many modern-day Jews is that if donation of this form is not possible, the obligation of tzedakah still requires that something be given. Traditional Jews commonly practice ma'sar kesafim, tithing 10% of their income to support those in need.

The Shulchan Arukh was composed in 16th century and has become the most widely accepted code of Jewish law ever written. It states:

The amount of charity one should give is as follows: if one can but afford, let him give as much as is needed. Under ordinary circumstances, a fifth of one's property is most laudable. To give one-tenth is the average disposition. But to give less than one-tenth is niggardly.

— Shulchan Arukh: Yoreh De'ah Ch. 249, translated by sefaria.org

Special acts of tzedakah are performed on significant days: At weddings, Jewish brides and bridegrooms would traditionally give to charity to symbolise the sacred character of the marriage. At Passover, a major holiday in Jewish tradition, it is traditional to be welcoming towards hungry strangers and feed them at the table. At Purim it is considered obligatory for every Jew to give food to one other person, and gifts to at least two poor people, in an amount that would equate to a meal each, for the purpose of increasing the total happiness during the month.

As for the more limited form of tzedakah expressed in the biblical laws, namely the leaving of gleanings from certain crops, the Shulchan Aruch argues that during The Exile Jewish farmers are not obliged to obey it. Nevertheless, in modern Israel, rabbis of Orthodox Judaism insist that Jews allow gleanings to be consumed by the poor and by strangers, and all crops (not just gleanings) by anyone and everyone (free, not bought nor sold) during sabbatical years.

In addition, one must be very careful about how one gives out tzedakah money. It is not sufficient to give to just any person or organization; rather, one must check their credentials and finances to be sure that your tzedakah money will be used wisely, efficiently, and effectively. The meaning of "Do not steal from a poor person, for (s)he is poor" (Proverbs 22:22) and of Talmudic-era commentaries, including Numbers Rabba 5:2, is that tzedakah money was never yours to begin with. Rather, it always belongs to God, who merely entrusts you with it so that you may use it properly. Hence, you are obliged to ensure that it is received by those who are deserving.

According to the Halacha, every time a poor person asks for charity, he must be given at least a small amount, as it is written in the Torah," Do not make an effort to give but let it come of yourself, and do not close your hand from giving to the poor" (Deuteronomy 15:7), but if one is in the middle of the prayer, there is no obligation to give him charity, since during prayer time one is busy with another mitzvah.

There are many examples of tzedakah funds that operate according to Maimonides' principles above (particularly #2), including Hands on Tzedakah (working with nonprofits in the U.S. and in Israel), and Mitzvah Heroes Fund (working mainly with nonprofits in Israel). Paamonim is a nonprofit organization in Israel that operates according to Maimonides' first principle. Keeping a pushke (a collection box) in private homes is traditional.

The Gaon of Vilna considered giving tzedakah to all householders in the city with tax benefits. Dvēyre-Ēster Helfer (1817–1907) was known among Vilna's Jewish population for assisting people in difficulty, despite she and her husband not being wealthy. Utilizing her memory, she connected with individuals to coordinate aid throughout her life, leading many to view her as a saintlike figure who secured funds and offered blessings with her charitable gifts. She also helped fund a prayerhouse dedicated to charity for the needy that was colloquially named after her. Her death was commemorated in ways typically reserved for religious figures, and her portrait was hung alongside the Gaon's in some Vilna homes.

=== Pushka ===
Both Jewish homes and synagogues have a charity collection box into which cash is placed. At home, particularly before the woman of the house lights her Sabbath candles, it is a way of setting aside money. In the synagogue, a designated individual circulates (and shakes it to announce this opportunity).

In Chicago in the early 1900s "Many of the families kept pushkas, or contribution containers, as a handy means of making periodic contribution to worthwhile causes." The Polish word puszka means tin can.

=== TAT ===
TAT (an acronym for Tomchei Torah) is an institutionalized arrangement whereby money is donated for either one-time (e.g. wedding) expenses or ongoing support, for the adult (and often married) yeshiva students. A check made out to "TAT of x" would be for those at that yeshiva, or perhaps it can be designated for a particular newly engaged student (or a student with a son or daughter newly engaged). Sometimes donations were intended for ongoing support of students not receiving family support.

== Examples ==
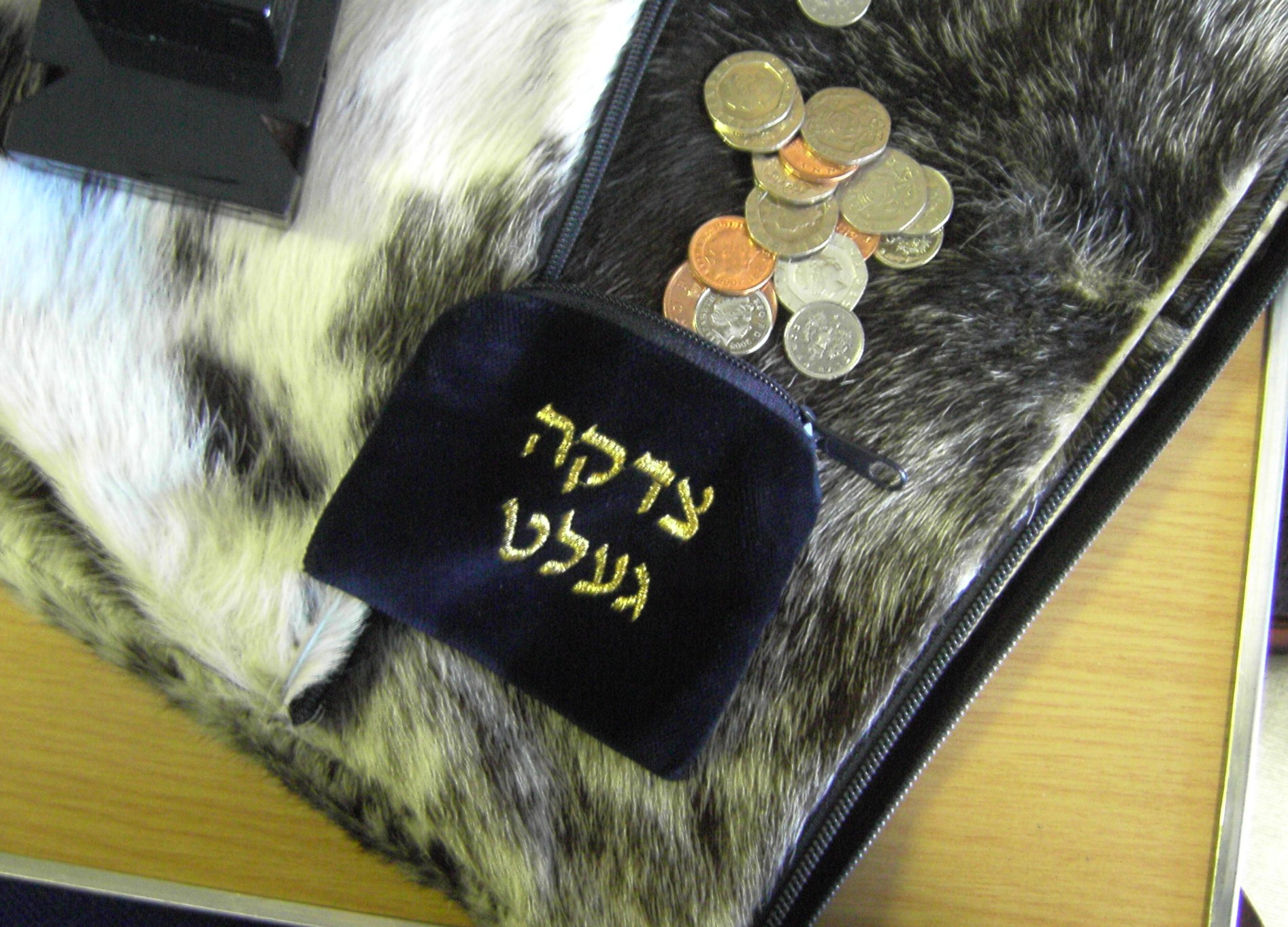
Tzedakah pouch and coins on fur-like padding

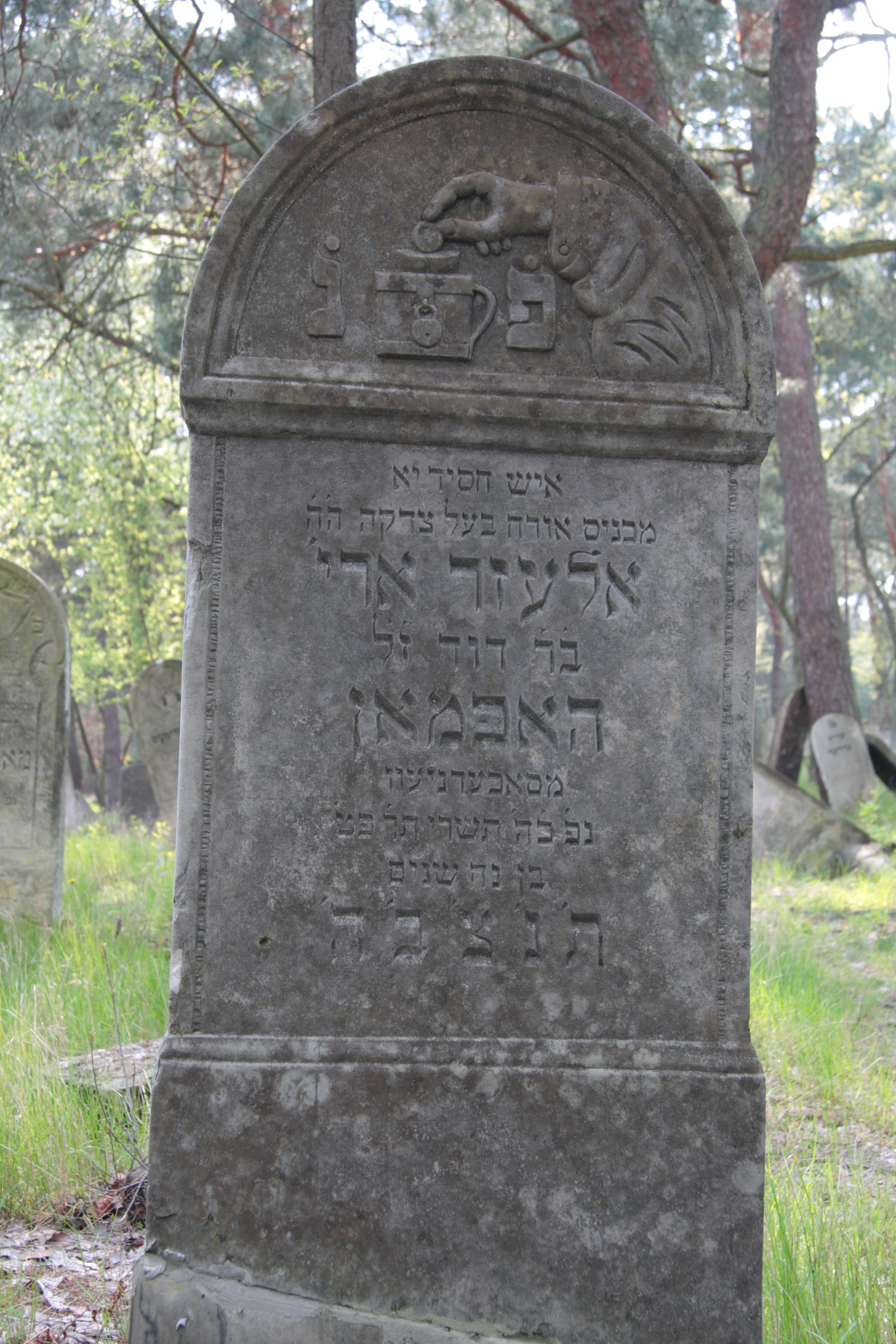
Tzedakah box on Jewish gravestone. Jewish cemetery in Otwock.

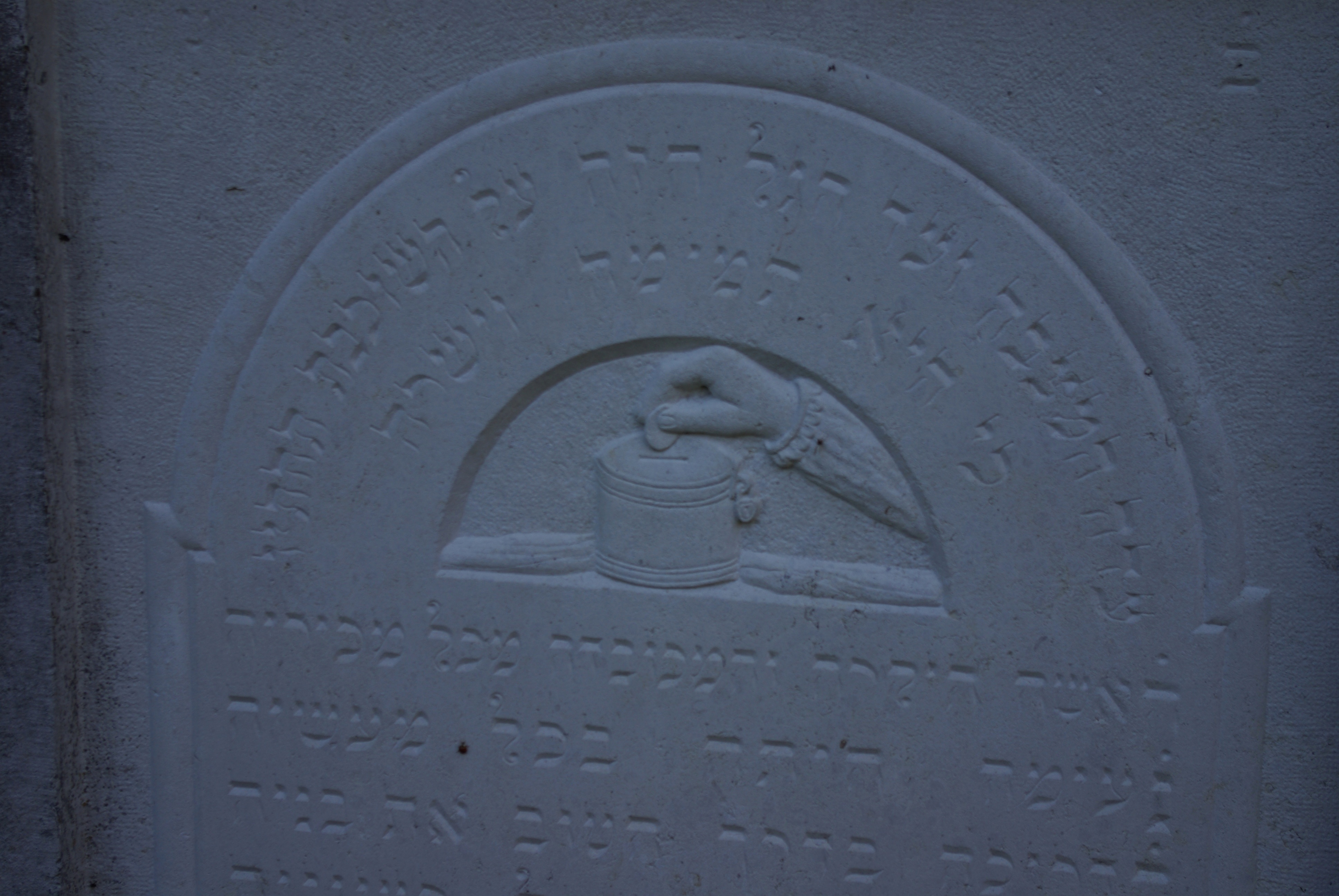
Tzedakah box on Jewish gravestone. Jewish cemetery in Pappenheim.

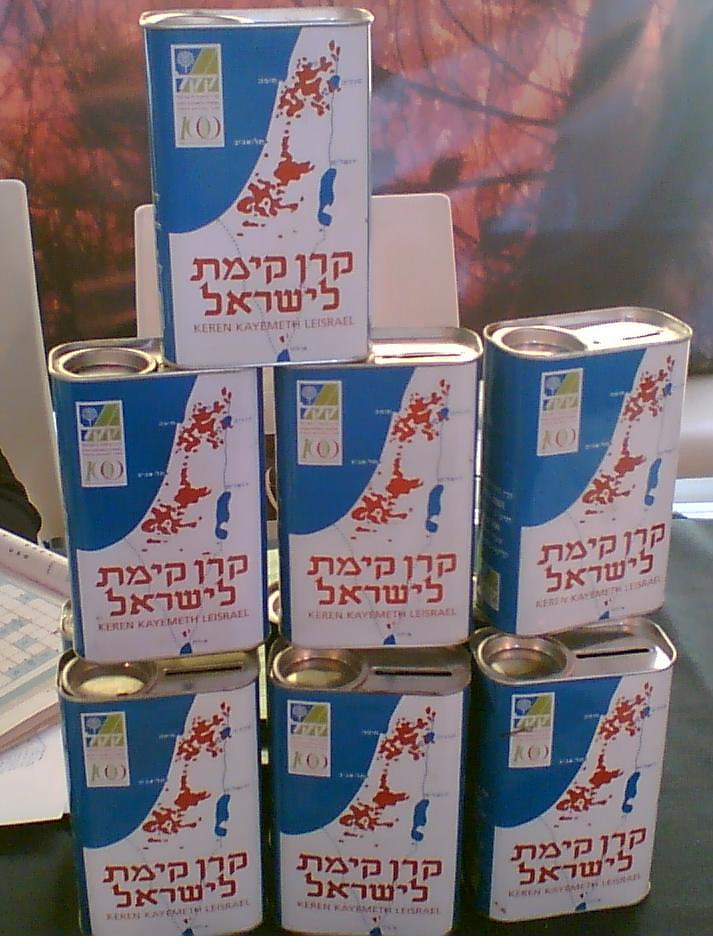
JNF collection box (pushke). The blue box of the Jewish National Fund was collecting donations for the establishment of the state in the early years.

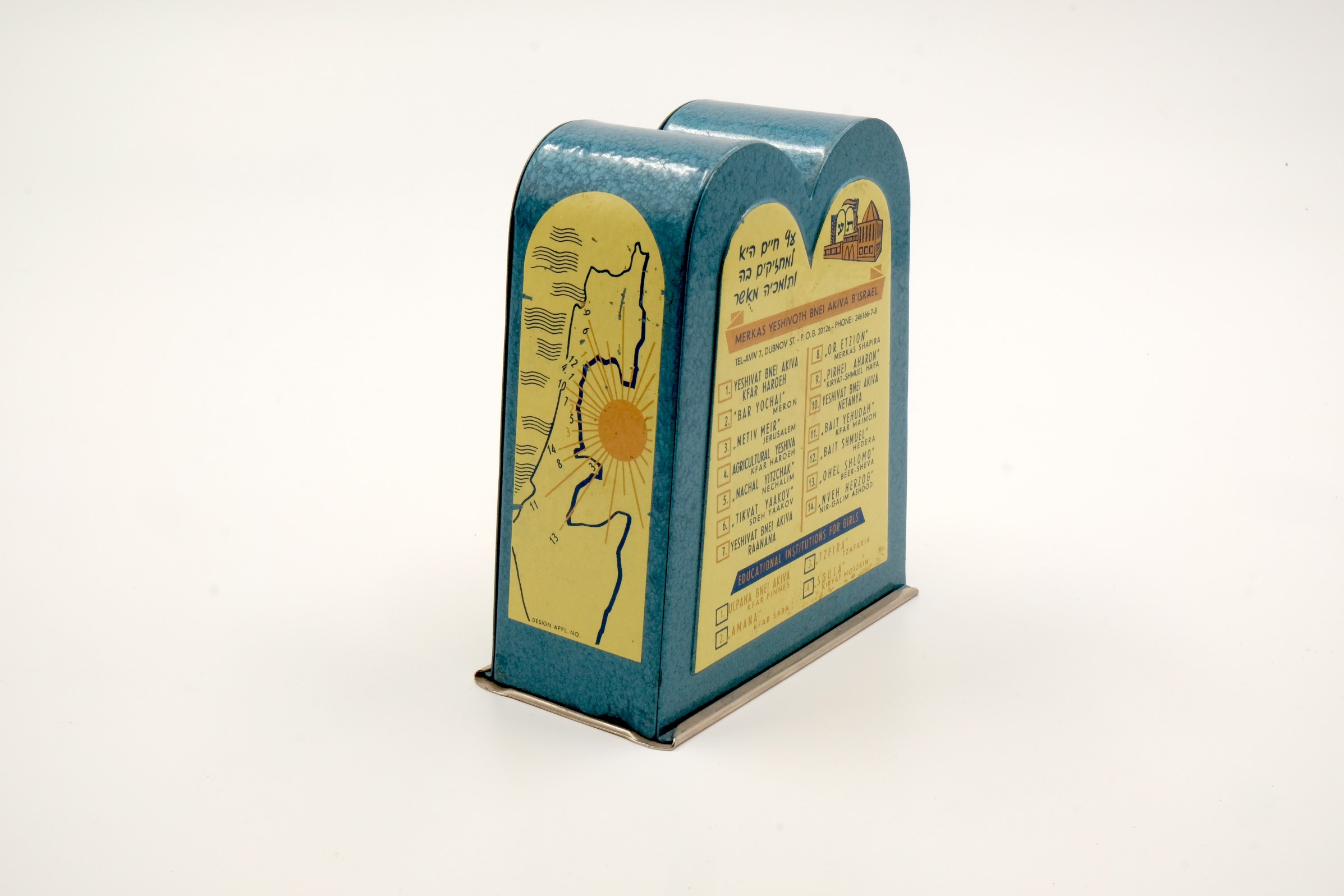
Donation box of the Merkas Yeshivot Bnei Akiva B'Israel, 1960–1970s, Tel Aviv, in the collection of the Jewish Museum of Switzerland

== See also ==
- Charity (practice)
- Charity (virtue)
- Donation
- Sadaqah (Islam), a related word from the Semitic language of Arabic
- Zidqa, almsgiving in Mandaeism

== Bibliography ==
- Dossick, Rabbi Wayne (2010). Living Judaism: The Complete Guide to Jewish Belief, Tradition, and Practice. ISBN 9780060621797.
