= Zidqa =

Alms in Mandaeism

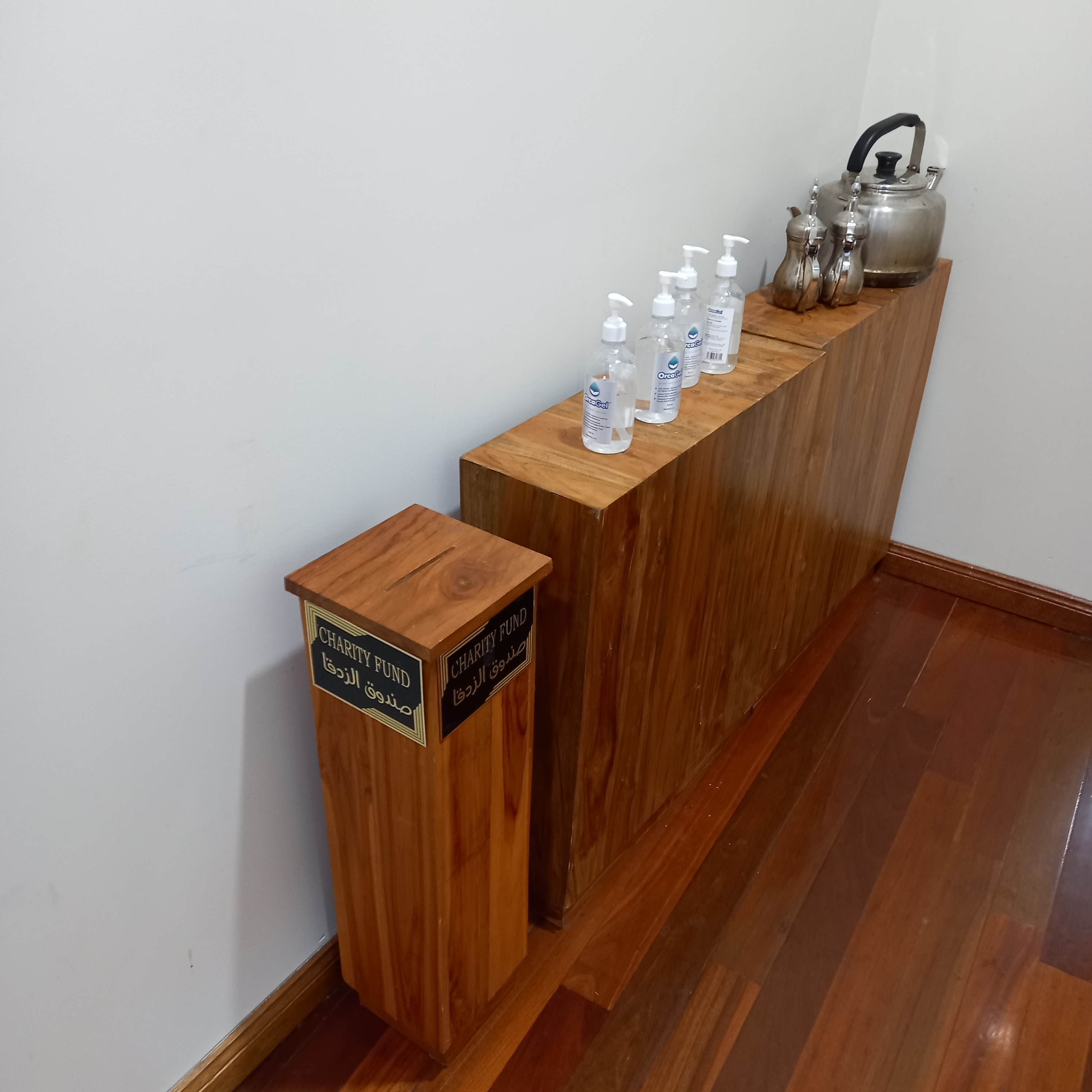
Zidqa or alms box (lower center) at Ganzibra Dakhil Mandi in Liverpool, New South Wales, Australia

In Mandaeism, zidqa (Classical Mandaic: ࡆࡉࡃࡒࡀ) refers to alms or almsgiving. Mandaean priests receive regular financial contributions from laypeople, since priesthood is typically a full-time occupation. Zidqa is also offered to the poor and needy.

In Mandaean scriptures, including the Qulasta, the term kana ḏ-zidqa is used to refer to alms collection. The word kana is originally used to refer to vessels for storing water or milk, and is of Akkadian origin.

== Other uses ==
The Mandaic term zidqa brika (literally "blessed oblation") refers to a ritual meal blessed by priests. An early self-appellation for Mandaeans is bhiri zidqa, meaning 'elect of righteousness'.

== See also ==
- Charity (Christian virtue)
- Zakat in Islam
- Sadaqah in Islam (Arabic cognate)
- Tzedakah in Judaism (Hebrew cognate)
- Dāna in Hinduism
