= Ohel (social services) =

Ohel (Note: pronounced Oh'-hel) Children's Home and Family Services (Hebrew: [ˈohel]; lit. "tent") is a large not-for-profit Jewish social service agency, primarily located in New York City, that provides counseling, crisis intervention, and other services to children and families who are going through or suffering from abuse, domestic violence, marital problems, mental health issues, or neglect. NYC's Child Welfare Administration works with Ohel when serious situations arise. (Note: such as forced foster placements)

As of 2008, Ohel has over 1200 employees, including psychologists, psychiatrists, social workers, case managers, and mental health workers. The agency consists of divisions used to support individuals with mental illness, developmental disabilities, and other psychiatric and psychological difficulties. Trained and certified Ohel foster parents provide safe, loving homes to Jewish children.

The organization is larger than others with similar missions in the NYC area, such as Mekimi and Harmony Services.

== Expansion ==
Ohel consolidated some of their services (Note: not including Bais Ezra'"`UNIQ--ref-0000000E-QINU`"' or Camp Kaylie'"`UNIQ--ref-0000000F-QINU`"') into a new facility, known as Ohel Jaffa Family Campus, a process that was underway by 2010.

At the end of 2014, in announcing a $2 million funding grant for additional expansion, NYC Council Speaker Melissa Mark-Viverito began with "For over 45 years, OHEL Children’s Home and Family Services has ..." and noted that it will "increase accessibility and delivery of services."

== Programs ==
One major service offered by Ohel is group homes and supportive housing.
