= Sacred food as offering =

Concept within anthropology

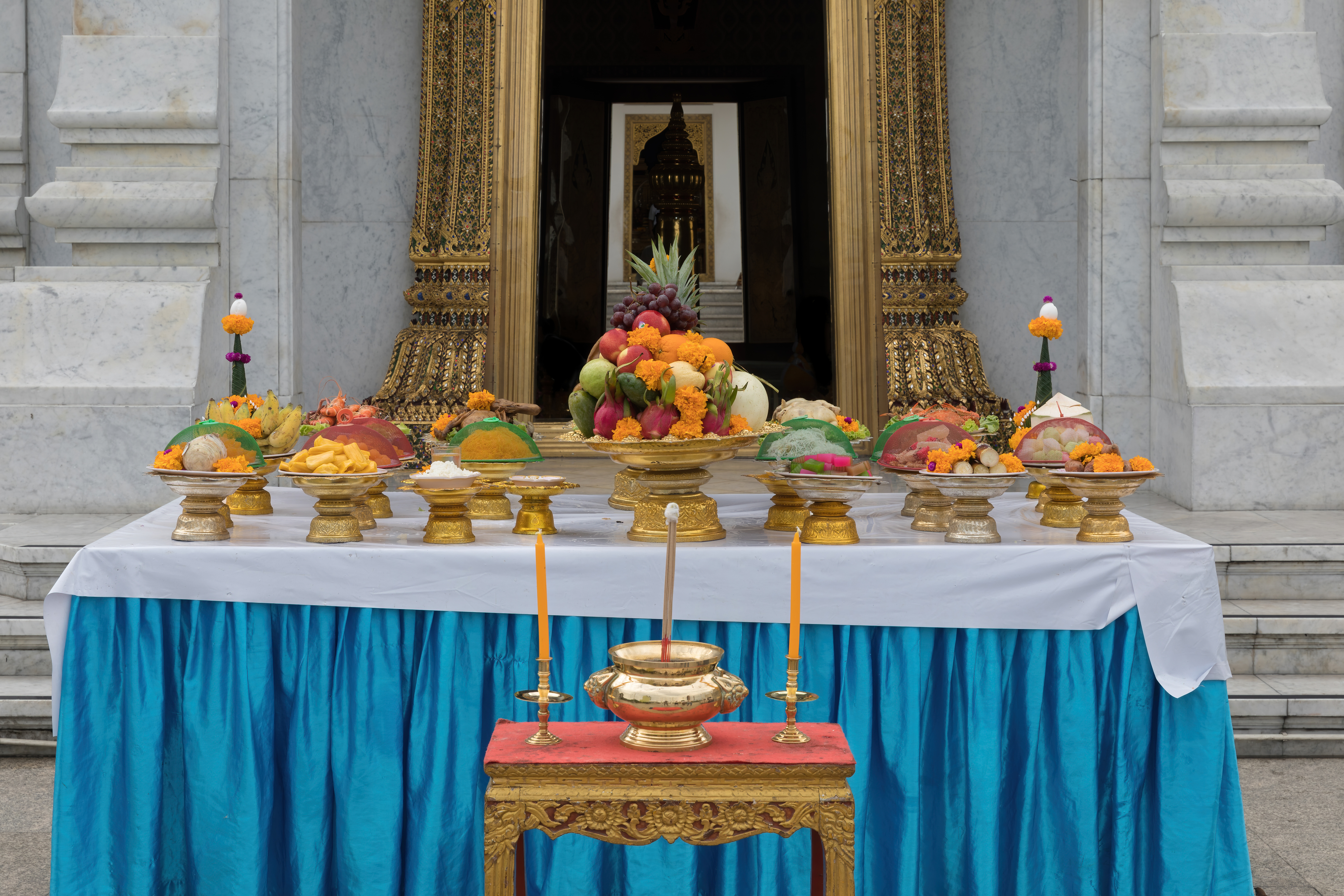
Buddhist offering table with fruits, meat, rice, confectionery, flowers and candles at Bangkok City Pillar Shrine, Thailand.

Sacred food as offering is a concept within anthropology regarding the study of food as it relates to religious ritual.

Many religions have prescriptions about the correct preparation and cooking of food, besides the taboos about forbidden subjects. Many religions have special spellings for the food, which sacralize it and, therefore, who will eat it; but there are foods sacred by its inner nature. In Brazilian Candomblé by example, fish are sacred for their connection to Iemanjá, horns given the relation to Iansã. Consequently, those foods are considered offerings. This takes place in other religions too.

== Examples ==
Some examples include:

- Sacramental bread, and sacramental wine, are elements in the Eucharist.
- Chrism, also called myrrh, and holy anointing oil -- Element in anointing of the sick, baptism, and priesthood blessing
- coconut: Ganesha in Hinduism
- milk, betel leaves: Shiva in Hinduism
- flowers, tulsi and fruit: Krishna in Hinduism
- Oxalá in Candomblé (see above)
- bread: the body of Christ in Catholicism
- the challah in Judaism is symbol of divine presence in shabat
- chestnut: Befana
- coca leaf: for the Andean cultures
- Leola's Maize Corn: Amerindian goddess of prosperity in cajun of Louisiana

In Mandaeism, there are multiple types of ritual meal offerings:

- Lofani (most common type of ritual meal offering and does not need to be performed by a priest)
- Zidqa brikha (must performed by priests)
- Dukrana (for commemorating the dead)
- Pan de muerto (for commemorating the dead in México)

== See also ==
- Anthropology of religion
- Canang sari
- Food and drink prohibitions
- Libation
- Religion and alcohol
- Religion and drugs
- List of substances used in rituals
- Sacramental bread
- List of foods with religious symbolism
