= Tariana (Mandaeism) =

Ritual clay tray used in Mandaean religious rituals

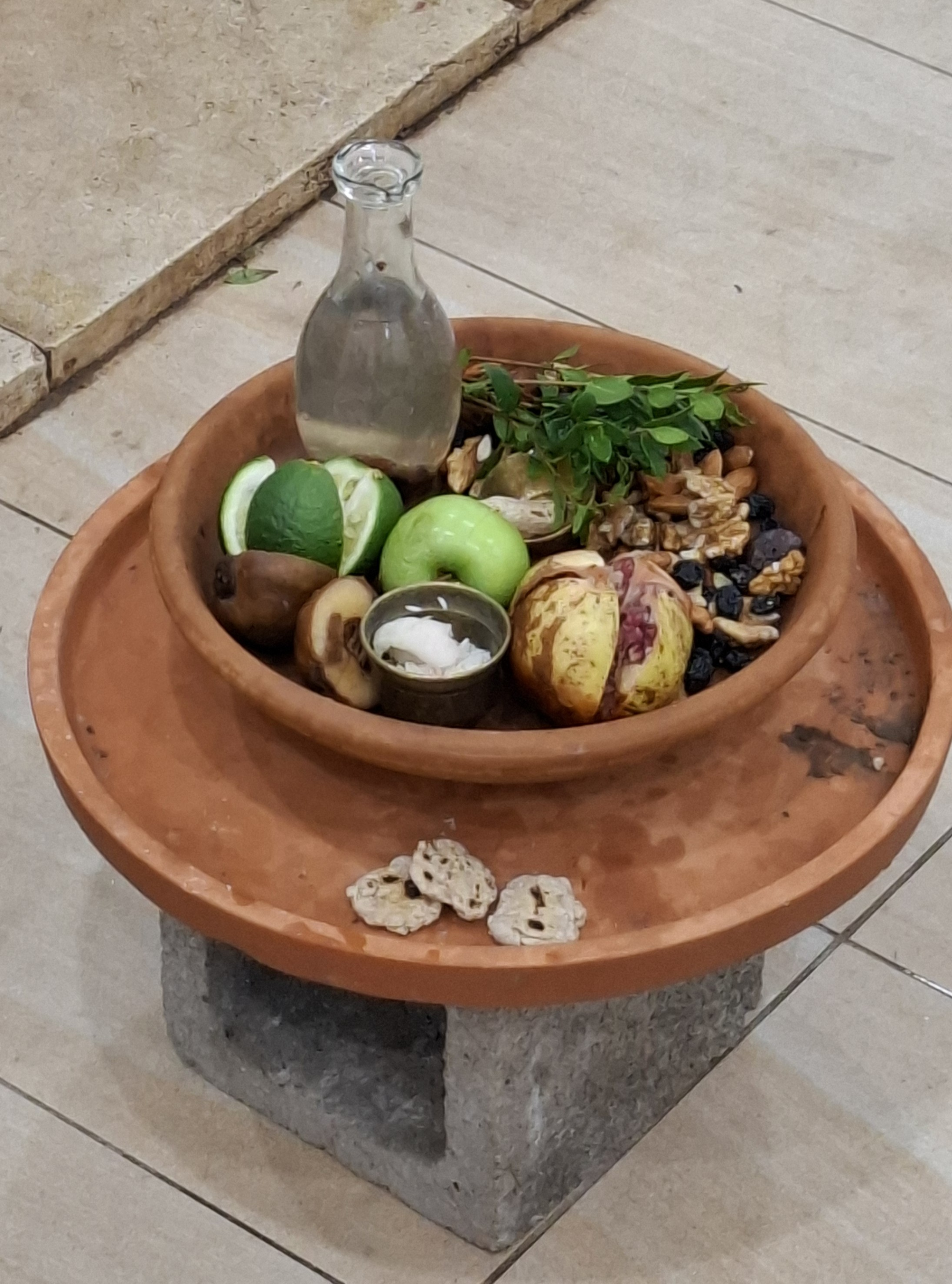
Zidqa brikha offering placed on a ṭariana (clay tray) at Yahya Yuhana Mandi during Parwanaya 2025. The ṭariana is in turn placed on top of a kangana (stand).

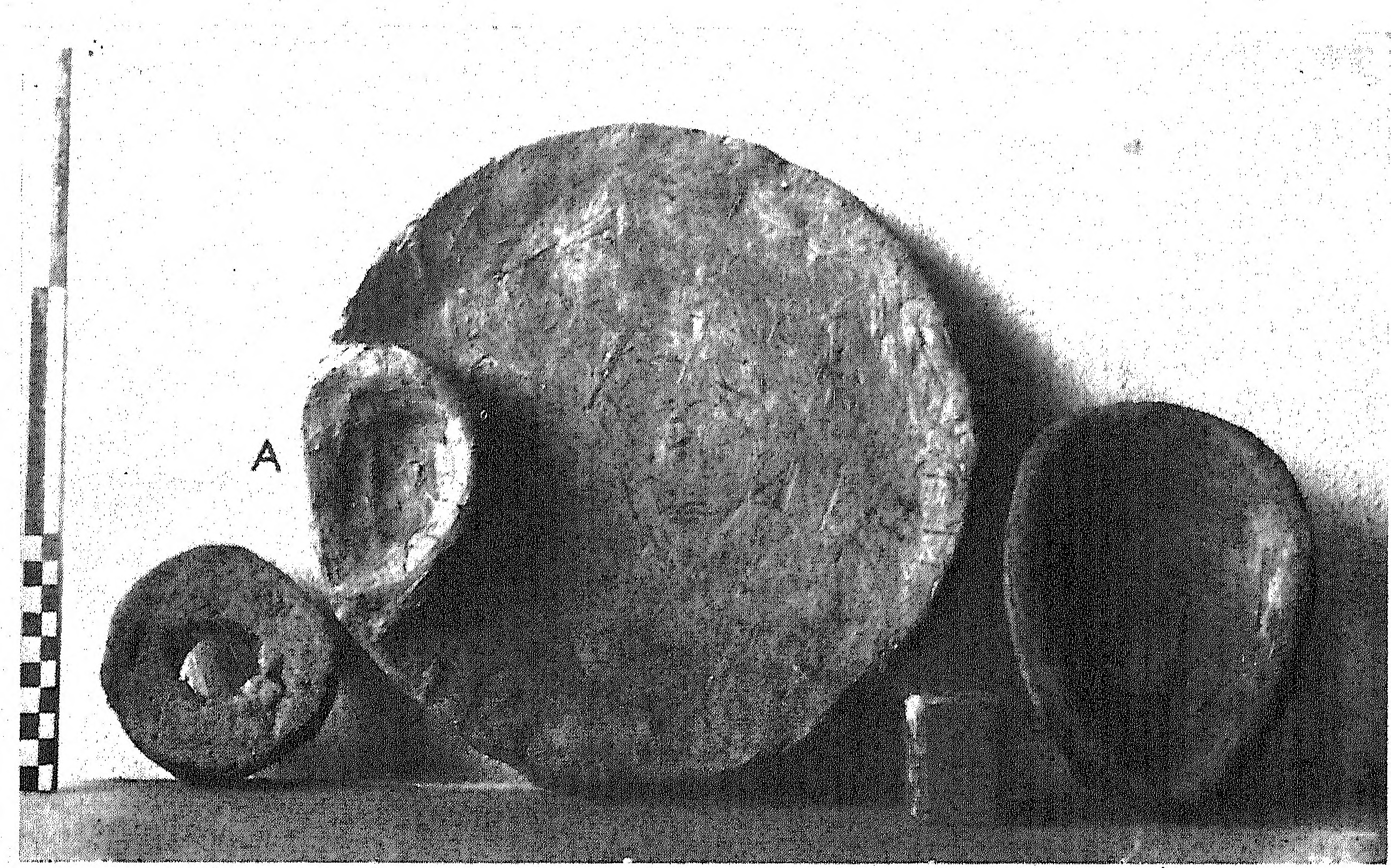
Mandaean clay utensils (1930s, southern Iraq). The large clay tray in the center (to the right of the letter "A"), which is the biggest object in the photograph, is the ṭariana.

In Mandaeism, the ṭariana (Classical Mandaic: ࡈࡀࡓࡉࡀࡍࡀ) is a ritual clay tray used to place food offerings such as pihta, fruits, and nuts. It is used as part of ritual meals such as the zidqa brikha and lofani.

The miṣra, a concave depression or furrow in the ṭariana, is used to enclose purified areas.

The ṭariana is placed on top of a clay stand called the kangana.

Other related ritual clay objects used by Mandaean priests include:

- Qauqa (bit riha, a terra-cotta cube for holding incense)
- Brihi (fire-saucer)

== See also ==
- Zidqa brikha
- Lofani
