= Mekimi =

- Location: Israel
- Employees: 4 (as of 2013)
- Website: www.mekimi.org.il/en

Mekimi is a non-profit organization operating in Israel aimed at assisting families in financial distress so that they may regain their economic independence.

Based in Jerusalem and established in 2011, Mekimi is not a sectorial organization yet the majority of families seeking help from Mekimi come from the National Religious segment. Mekimi works with the families and professionals such as lawyers, accountants, mortgage brokers, and even marriage counselours to restructure family debt which has so far included cases between 20 000NIS to 500 000NIS. One of Mekimi's unique features is to galvanize the community around the family in financial crisis and without the community knowing specifically who is being helped. Mekimi raises money to help the family settle debts from banks, lenders and even loan sharks and also teaches them to reduce usage or altogether stop using credit cards, cheques. The service is given free of charge. In April 2014, Petah Tikva was the location of Mekimi' opening a second branch.

israel Livman, formerly the vice-president of operations at Paamonim, founded Mekimi in memory of both his father who had died and a brother who had been killed, and now serves as the organization's director. Livman explains the motivation behind forming a similar organization in that while Paamonim helps the vast majority of families that approach it, it ends up turning away some hard cases which it does not have the resources to assist. Livman took on the challenge to help those extreme cases. Some of the families get stuck in the vicious downward cycle of black market moneylenders and in these cases, Livman might meet with them in order to restructure and mediate a solution to pay off the loan. Mekimi has publicly called for banks to resist tempting customers to go further into debt and for families to make do with what they have even if it means selling a car or moving to a smaller home.
