= Zidqa brikha =

Mandaean ritual meal offering performed by priests

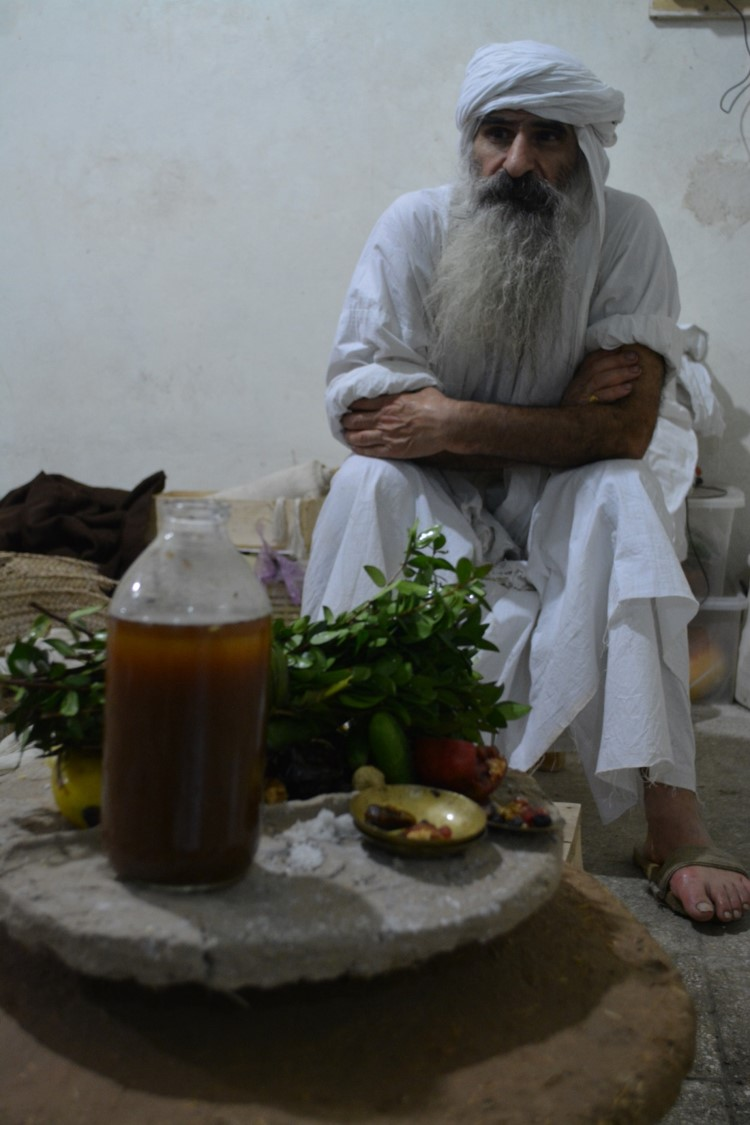
Ganzibra Najah Choheili waiting for two tarmidia and shgandia to join him to start performing zidqa brikha, the final ritual for the masiqta, during the 2015 Parwanaya festival in Ahvaz, Iran.

In Mandaeism, the zidqa brikha (or zidqa brika; Classical Mandaic: ࡆࡉࡃࡒࡀ ࡁࡓࡉࡊࡀ, lit. 'blessed oblation', Modern Mandaic pronunciation: [ˈzɪdqa ˈbriχa]) is a type of ritual meal blessed by Mandaean priests. Zidqa means oblation and can also mean alms, while brikha means blessed. Unlike the lofani, which is a minor ritual meal that does not require the presence of a priest, the zidqa brikha needs to be prepared by a priest.

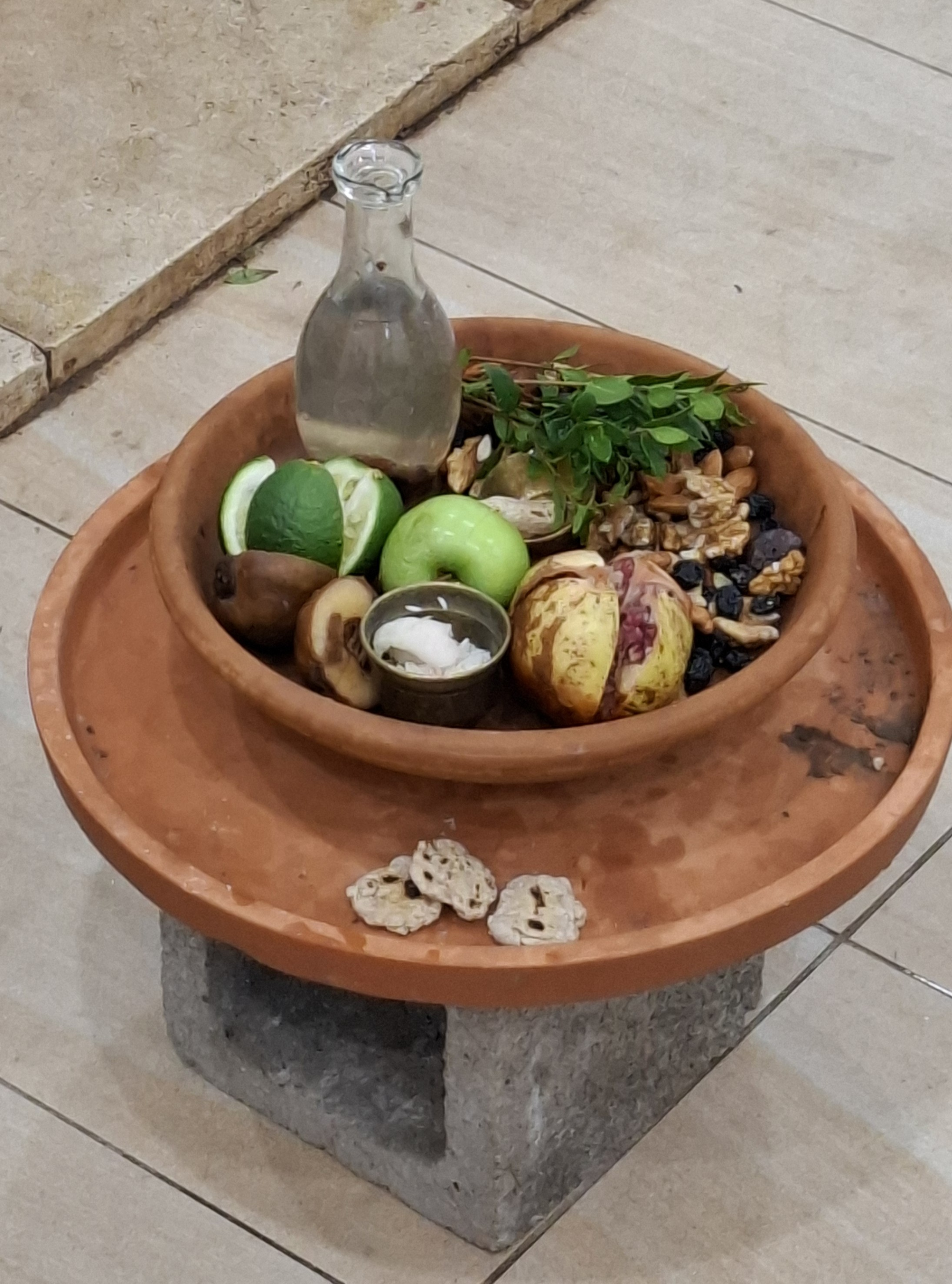
Zidqa brikha offering placed on a ṭariana (clay tray) at Yahya Yuhana Mandi during Parwanaya 2025

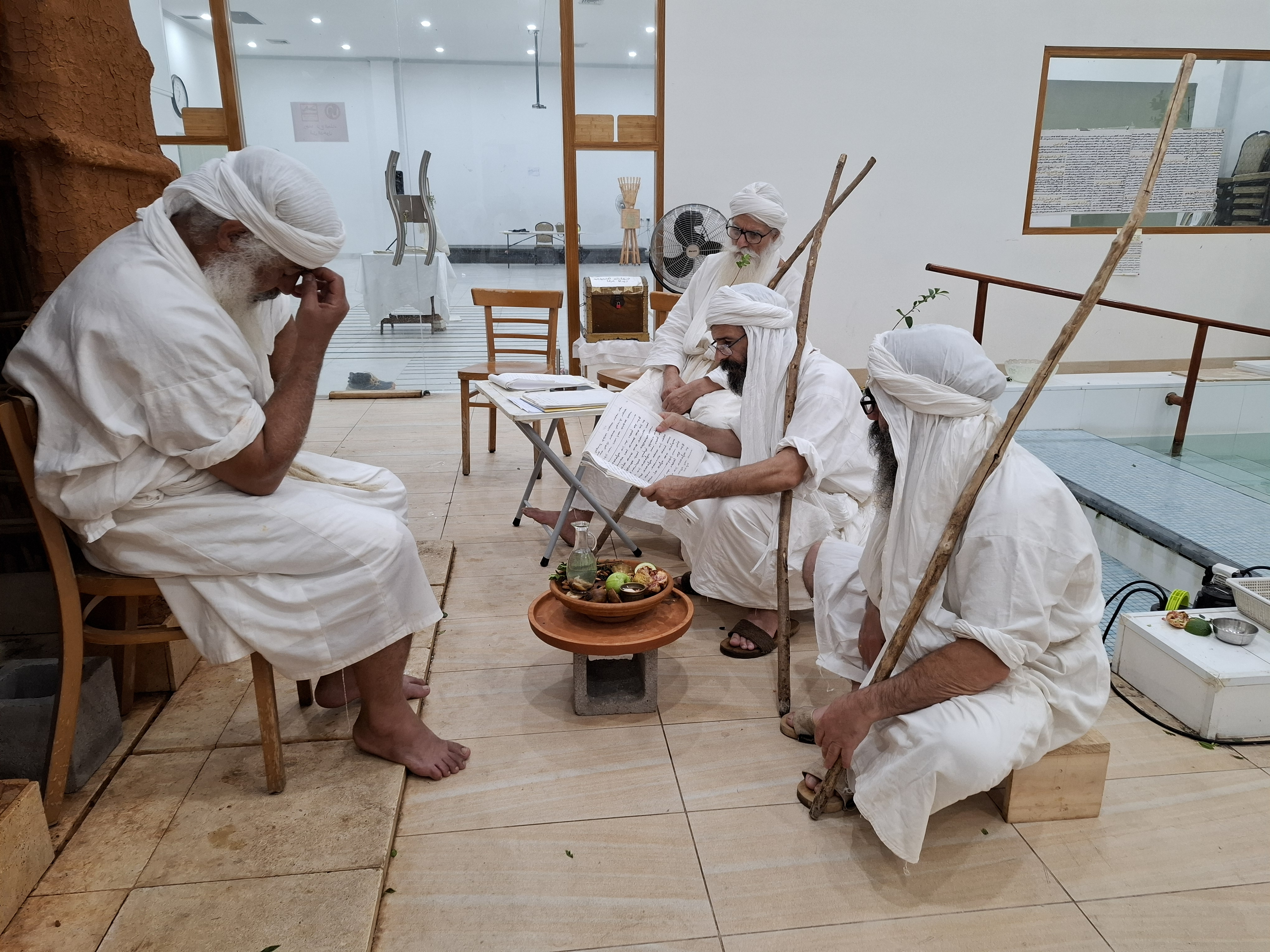
Ganzibra Khaldoon Majid Abdullah, Tarmida Sahi Bashikh, and Tarmida Muneer Ashor performing zidqa brikha at Yahya Yuhana Mandi during Parwanaya 2025

The zidqa brikha is offered and eaten at the end of tarmida (junior priest) initiation ceremonies, after the novice's 60-day seclusion period. It is also offered at weddings and during the Parwanaya festival. During Parwanaya, the zidqa brikha is performed privately by priests around midnight, rather than in front of a large congregation of laypeople.

The ahaba ḏ-mania or hava ḏ-mania (presentation of garments) is a form of zidqa brika for those who have not died wearing the ritual garment, or for the ritually impure. It is performed on a proxy during the Parwanaya.

It is distinct from the lofani and dukrana, which are two other types of ritual meal offered for the dead.

== Prayers ==
In E. S. Drower's version of the Qulasta, prayers 348–374 are for the zidqa brikha. Prayers 375–381 are blessings recited after the zidqa brikha.

== Parallels in other religions ==
E. S. Drower draws comparisons between the Afringan ceremony in Zoroastrianism and the zidqa brikha ceremony in Mandaeism.

== See also ==
- Sacred food as offering
- Votive offering
- Dukrana
- Eucharist
- Koliva
- Lofani
- Zidqa
- Prasada in Hinduism
- Afrinagan ceremony in Zoroastrianism
