= Oblation =

Church offering

An oblation is a solemn offering, sacrifice or presentation to God, to the Church for use in God's service, or to the faithful, such as giving alms to the poor.

The word comes from the Late Latin oblatio (from offerre, oblatum 'to offer'), 'an instance of offering' and by extension 'the thing offered'.

== Bible use ==
The Latin Vulgate, and following this many English versions such as the KJV, 1611, uses the word to stand for the meal offering under the Law of Moses.

== Ecclesiastical use ==
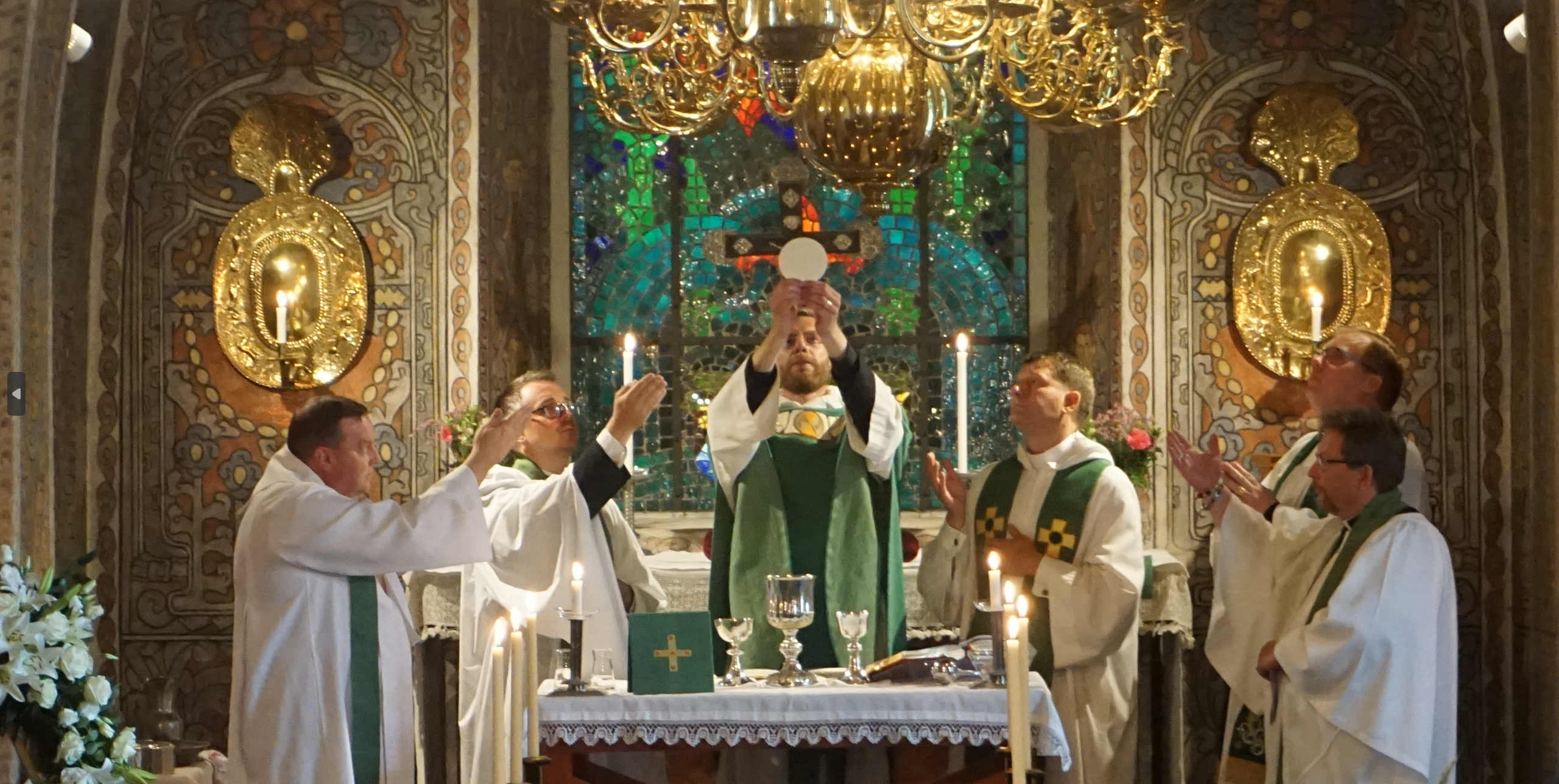
Lutheran priest elevating the host during the Mass at Alsike Church, Sweden

It is thus applied to certain parts of the Eucharistic service in Christian liturgies. The rites of Roman Catholicism, Eastern Orthodoxy, Lutheranism, and Anglicanism employ an oblation: gifts of bread and wine are offered to God.

Liturgically speaking, there are two oblations: the lesser oblation, sometimes known as the offertory, in which the bread and wine, as yet unconsecrated, are presented and offered to God, and the greater oblation, the oblation proper, in which the Body and Blood of Christ are offered to God, the Father.

The word oblate is also an ecclesiastical term for persons who have devoted themselves or have been devoted as children by their parents to a monastic life. Oblate is more familiar in the Roman Catholic Church as the name of a Religious Congregation of secular or diocesan priests, the Oblate Fathers of St. Charles. They are placed under the absolute authority of the bishop of the diocese in which they are established and can be employed by him on any duties he may think fit. This congregation was founded in 1578 under the name of Oblates of the Blessed Virgin and St. Ambrose by St. Charles Borromeo, Archbishop of Milan.

A similar congregation of secular priests, the Missionary Oblates of Mary Immaculate, was founded at Marseilles in 1815.

== Annualia ==
In Catholicism, annualia were a specific type of oblation made for a deceased person by their family, though sources disagree on the nature of the offering. The 1728 Cyclopædia, or an Universal Dictionary of Arts and Sciences defines the annualia as a solemn Mass celebrated yearly on the date of the deceased person's death. Other sources state that the annualia comprised a series of Masses performed each day for a year on behalf of the deceased, at the behest of their family, who would pay a stipend to the clergy member performing the rites. The annualia could be extended to a triennial (daily mass for three years) or shortened to a trental (daily mass for thirty days) depending on the needs of the family.

== Mandaeism ==
In Mandaeism, an oblation blessed by priests is called zidqa brikha.

== See also ==
- Votive offering
- Libation
- Mass in the Catholic Church
- Sacrifice
- Eucharist
- Divine Liturgy
- Showbread
- Mass (liturgy)
- Sacramental wine
- Sacramental bread
- Sacrament
