= Hands on Tzedakah =

US-based non-profit organization

Hands On Tzedakah
- Founded: June 9, 2003; 23 years ago
- Legal status: 501(c)(3) nonprofit organization
- Headquarters: Boca Raton, Florida, United States
- Coordinates: 26.4088328°N 80.1454906°W
- President, Treasurer: Ronald Gallatin
- Revenue: $1,128,684 (FYE 2017)
- Expenses: $1,187,228 (FYE 2017)
- Employees: 0 (FYE 2017)
- Volunteers: 6 (FYE 2017)
- Website: handsontzedakah.org

Hands On Tzedakah is a 501(c)(3) public charity headquartered in Boca Raton, Florida. Founded in 2003, the organization provides funding for various social service programs in the United States, Israel, and other countries.

== Activities ==
As of June 30, 2022, Hands On Tzedakah (HOT) had raised and distributed over $22,000,000 to support more than 100 projects in the United States, in Israel, and in other parts of the world.

HOT's primary focus is to support essential safety-net programs addressing hunger, poverty, health care and disaster relief. HOT assists programs providing support to the economically disadvantaged, disabled, elderly, and victims of abuse and terrorism. HOT also provides scholarship support to students in need.

HOT connects the donors with the recipients and facilitates communication between the donors and the projects. In addition, HOT listens to the donor, seeking out new initiatives that are important to him/her. Whenever possible, donor dollars are leveraged through matching funds from other donors and organizations.

The initial criteria for funding requires that the project or need meet the parameters of the mission statement. If a program meets these parameters then prior to any substantial program funding, HOT engages in a "Hands On" process by researching the program and obtaining and reviewing information on budgets and other financial information, including tax returns and accounting reports. Also, there is a belief that utilizing volunteers is essential.

In cases where funds are distributed to individual intermediaries who have developed programs that meet the criteria, HOT insists upon an ongoing interaction with regular financial and operating reports to HOT so that there is satisfaction that the funds allocated to them are used as intended.
