= Paamonim =

- Founded: 1997
- Founders: Uriel Lederberg, Ya'akov Ya'akobovitch, and Ya'akov Friedman
- Location: Petah Tikva, Israel
- Region served: Israel
- Subsidiaries: PTP (PAHAMON) : Preventive Educational Services
- Volunteers: 2,000+ (2010)
- Website: paamonim.org

Paamonim is a non-profit organization operating in Israel aimed at assisting families in financial difficulty so that they may regain their economic independence.

== History ==
Founded in 1997 by Uriel Lederberg, Ya'akov Ya'akobovitch, and Ya'akov Friedman, it assisted over 2,500 families enrolled in its Economic Recovery Plan program in 2010.

On August 9, 2010, the President of Israel Shimon Peres recognized Paamonim as an outstanding volunteer organization.

== Goals and actions ==
Rather than provide temporary charitable relief, the organization aims to break the cycle of poverty by focusing on long-term comprehensive solutions to debt and poverty. It does this primarily through trained volunteer mentors/coaches who work with families to find better ways to manage household finances. Each volunteer or pair of volunteers works with one or two families at a time. They help the family get a clear picture of their situation, take actions to improve it, and finally advise the family on how to deal with outstanding debt and plan for the future.

At each stage the volunteer consults with senior volunteers, volunteer experts, and professional staff. The mentoring is offered free of charge.

In addition, financial assistance or loans may be offered when these can be useful in achieving financial stability for the family.

== PTP (PAHAMON): preventive educational services ==
The organization also operates a division called PAHAMON, which gives preventive lectures and seminars on household finance to groups. There is a fee for this service. The organization is supported by donations.
